= Laidcenn mac Bairchid =

Laidcenn mac Bairchid, or Laidcenn mac Bairceda, is said to have been an early Irish language poet, whose floruit, if he existed, may have fallen in the middle of the 5th century.

According to later glosses, he belonged to the Cruthin of Dál nAraidi in Ulster, a claim which may well be incorrect. A poem on the Kings of Leinster included in the Corpus genealogiarum Hiberniae is attributed to him, but Kuno Meyer considered the attribution to be certainly false and the poem is dated to the 7th century.

Laidcenn's poem, if indeed it is his, provides a very different list of kings to that contained in the Book of Leinster, probably intended to support the claims of the Uí Bairrche to the primacy in Leinster.

Book of Leinster	Laidcenn's poem
Bresal Bélach, common ancestor of Uí Cheinnselaig and Uí Dúnlainge, grandson of Catháer Már	Bresal Bélach
Énnae Cennsalach, grandson of Bresal, eponym of the Uí Cheinnselaig	Muiredach Mo Sníthech, son of Daire Barrach eponym of the Uí Bairrche, grandson of Catháer Már
Crimthann son of Énnae Cennsalach	Móenach son of Muiredach Mo Sníthech
Fráech mac Finchada of the Uí Garrchon, not a descendant of Catháer Már	Mac Cairthinn mac Coelboth, great-grandson of Catháer Már
Illan, son of Dúnlaing eponym of the Uí Dúnlainge, fifth generation descendant of Catháer Már	Nad Buidb, grandson of Daig eponym of the Uí Dega, sixth generation descendant of Catháer Már
