= Fortúatha =

Medieval Irish population-groups

Fortúath is an Old Irish word meaning "external people". It denotes a people within a kingdom that were free but neither eligible for the kingship nor involved in choosing the king.

The term can also be used to refer to the territory occupied by such peoples.

== Etymology ==
The word fortúath is formed out of the prefix for-, with the sense "upon" or "in addition to", and the noun túath ("people"). An apparently equivalent term is forslondud.

== Social Structure ==
The fortúatha were "kingdoms not ruled directly by members of the dominant dynasty of a province". They have also been described as "in effect, people belonging to a different stock from that of the rulers of the territory", yet sometimes enjoying a position of favour with the ruling people.

The externality of a fortúath was sometimes due to the people's supposed origins as migrants from elsewhere. The Ciannachta, for example, were related to the royal line of Munster but had settled as a fortúath in Ulster and the Midlands. A fortúath could also be related to the royal line of the kingdom but be specifically excluded from involvement in its kingship; such was the case for the Airgialla vis-à-vis the Uí Néill and the Kingship of Tara.

== Fortúatha groups ==
Population-groups classed as fortúatha included the Calraige, Ciarraige, Corca Fhir Trí, Delbhna, Déisi, Gailenga, Grecraige, Luighne, Masraige and Setantii.

The status of each population-group could differ from one part of the island to another, with some fortúatha being class as aithechtúatha in other regions. In Leinster, some reckoned among the fortúatha had previously held the provincial kingship. These were the Dál Messin Corb and its principal septs, the Uí Garrchon and the Uí Enechglaiss.

== People ==
Among the early medieval Irish were many notable people whose population-group were classed as fortúatha. They included:

- Brigid of Kildare (c. 451–525) - of the Fortuatha Laigin
- Brendan (c. 484 – c. 577) - of the Altraige of Ciarraige Luachra
- Iarlaithe mac Loga of Tuam (fl. 6th century) - a member of the Conmaicne
- Suibne moccu Fir Thrí (died 11 January 657) - possibly of the Corca Fhir Trí
- Neide mac Onchu (fl. c. 800) - a member of the Conmaicne
- Martan of Clonmacnoise (died 868) - a member of the Dartraighe
- Brian Bóruma mac Cennétig, (c. 941 – 23 April 1014) - Dál gCais
- Vilbaldr Dufþakrsson (fl. c. 980) - of the Osraighe
- Cúán úa Lothcháin (died 1024) - of the Gailenga of Tethba
- Flann Mainistrech (died 25 November 1056) - of the Ciannachta of Brega
- Ruaidrí Ó Gadhra (died 1256) - of the Gailenga of Connacht

== Annalistic references ==
All quotes from the Annals of the Four Masters, unless otherwise stated.

- 423: Máel Calland mac Fergal, king of the Fortuatha. (Fragmentary Annals of Ireland)
- 774: The battle of Cill Coice, in which Fearghal, son of Dunghal, son of Faelchu, lord of Fortuatha Laighean, was slain by the king Donnchadh.
- 776: The battle of Righ (the Ryewater river) was gained by the men of Breagh over the Leinstermen, on the day of Allhallows (Nov. 1) precisely, wherein were slain Cucongalt (king of Ui Garchon at Arklow), lord of Rath Inbhir, and Fearghal, son of Ailell, lord of Cinel Ucha.
- 783: Domnall son of Ceithernach, king of Uí Garrchon. (Annals of Ulster)
- 825: The destruction of Dun Laighen, at Druim, by the Pagans (Vikings), where Conaing, son of Cuchongelt, lord of the Fortuatha, was slain, with many others.
- 827: An encampment of the Laigin was overwhelmed by the heathens, and Conall son of Cú Chongalt, king of the Fortuatha, and countless others fell there. (Annals of Ulster)
- 972: Finnsnechta, son of Cinaedh, lord of Fortuatha-Laighean, died.
- 983: Fiachra, son of Finnshneacta, chief of Fortuatha-Laighean.
- 1014: Domhnall, son of Ferghal, king of the Fortuatha. (Chronicon Scotorum)
- 1039: Domhnall, son of Donnchadh, lord of Ui-Faelain, was slain by Domhnall Ua Fearghaile, lord of the Fortuatha.
- 1043: Domnall ua Fergaile, king of the Fortuatha of Laigin, was killed by the son of Tuathal (his own people). (Chronicon Scotorum)
- 1072: Gillaphadraig O'Fearghaile, lord of the Fortuatha, was killed.
- 1095: Domnall Dubh Ua Fearghaile, lord of Fortuatha-Laighean, died.
- 1170: Murchadh Ua Fearghail, lord of the Fortuatha, was slain by Ua Fiachrach, lord of Ui-Fineachlais.
