= Coirpre mac Néill =

Irish king

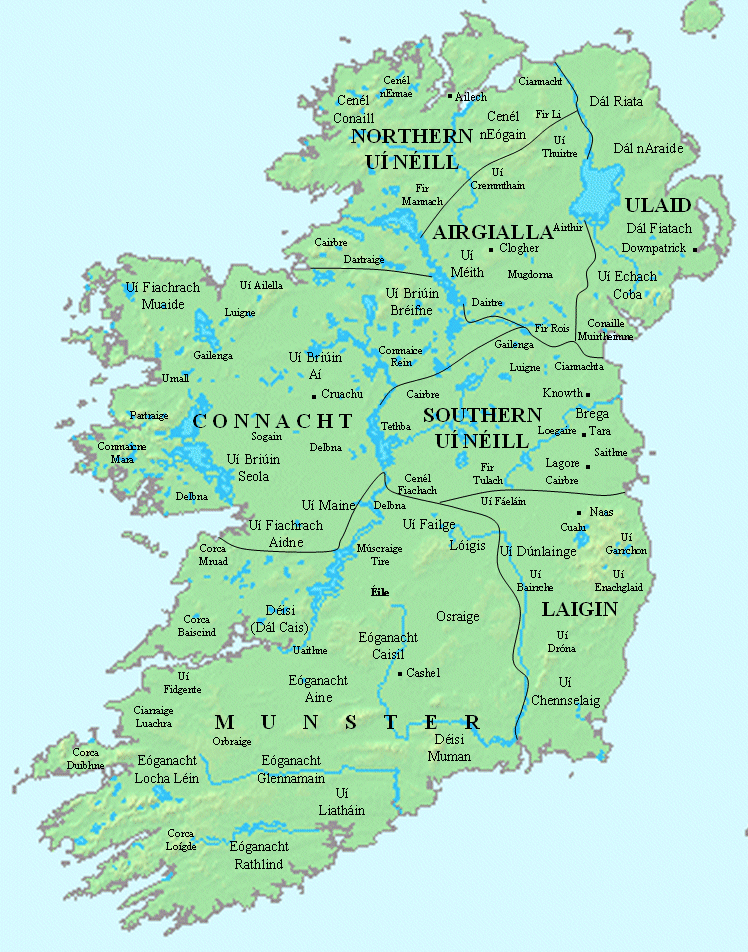
Early peoples and kingdoms of Ireland; the three kingdoms labelled Cairbre may perhaps represent the remains of Coirpre's conquests in the midlands

Coirpre mac Néill (fl. c. 485–493), also Cairbre or Cairpre, was said to be a son of Niall of the Nine Hostages. Coirpre was perhaps the leader of the conquests that established the southern Uí Néill in the midlands of Ireland. The record of the Irish annals suggests that Coirpre's successes were reattributed to Muirchertach Macc Ercae. Coirpre is portrayed as an enemy of Saint Patrick in Bishop Tirechán's hagiography and his descendants are said to have been cursed by Patrick so that none would be High King of Ireland. Coirpre is excluded from most lists of High Kings, but included in the earliest.

In later times Coirpre's descendants, the Cenél Coirpri, ruled over three small kingdoms—Cairbre Drom Cliabh in north County Sligo, an area in modern County Longford and at the headwaters of the River Boyne—which may be the remains of a once much larger kingdom stretching 100 miles (160 kilometres) from Donegal Bay to the Boyne.

== Sons of Conn, grandsons of Niall ==
The Uí Néill—the grandsons, or descendants, of Niall of the Nine Hostages—dominated the northern half of Ireland from the 7th century, and perhaps earlier. The various Uí Néill kingdoms, their allies, client kingdoms and subject tribes, comprised most of the province of Ulster, all of Connacht, and a large part of Leinster. Elaborate genealogies showed the descent of the various Uí Néill, while allies and favoured clients descended from Niall's brothers or other kinsmen. However, since Uí Néill means grandsons of Niall, the Uí Néill cannot have existed before the time of Niall's grandsons, towards the middle of the 6th century.

Medieval genealogists provided Niall with a large number of sons, some of doubtful historicity. Maine, ancestor of the Cenél Maini is generally presumed to be a late addition. The dates claimed for Lóegaire mac Néill, "great pagan Emperor of the Irish" and adversary of Saint Patrick in Muirchiu and Tirechán's 7th century lives, may make him an unlikely son of Niall. Diarmait mac Cerbaill, apical ancestor of the Síl nÁedo Sláine and Clann Cholmáin, the leading southern branches of the Uí Néill, is presented in the genealogies as the grandson of Niall's son Conall Cremthainne, but this is doubtful. As for Coirpre, he is called a son of Niall in one of the earliest surviving sources, Tirechán's life of Saint Patrick.

The kinship of the Northern and Southern Uí Néill is likely a politically convenient fiction, as several royal lines of the north belong to the Y-DNA R-M222 subclade, but this lineage does not seem to be present in the areas of Southern Uí Néill control.

== Conquests ==
Medieval Irish traditions claimed that the lands of the Uí Néill were conquered by Niall of the Nine Hostages and his sons, together with their allies. Coirpre may have led some of the earliest recorded Uí Néill conquests in the midlands. The annals appear to show that a number of victories, by Coirpre and others, or by persons unnamed, were later attributed to Macc Ercae, or to Muirchertach mac Muiredaig, who may be the same person.

From north-west to south-east, there were two kingdoms named for Coirpre mac Néill in early historical times. These were Cenél Coirpi Dromma Clíab, north Sligo on Donegal Bay, and Cenél Coirpri Mór, the northern half of Tethbae around Granard in modern County Longford. This alignment of territories may suggest that the kingdom of Coirpre and its satellites once extended over 100 miles across Ireland. A third Cenél Coirpri, the region around Carbury and the headwaters of the River Boyne in the north-west of County Kildare, is of much later origins.

In a year given as 485, Coirpre was credited with a victory at Grainert, perhaps modern Granard, where the chief church of Cenél Coirpri Mór of Tethbae was in later times. In the addition, which notes that the battle was won by "Mac Ercae as some say," the annal adds that Fincath mac Garrchu of the Dál Messin Corb, perhaps king of Leinster, was killed there. A second battle at Grainert is recorded under the year 495, repeated under 497, and here Fincath's son Fráech is said to have been killed by Coirpre's son Eochu.

Under the year 494, duplicated under 496, the annals record a victory by Coirpre over the Leinstermen at Tailtiu, in later times site of an important óenach, the óenach Tailten. Two further victories are reported, one under 497 at Slemain of Mide, probably near modern Mullingar, County Westmeath, and one under 499, at Cend Ailbe, perhaps somewhere in modern County Carlow.

Cenél Coirpre were associated with both Tailtiu and Granard in the earliest writings, but there is nothing in the annals to explain an early link with Carbury which could be as late as the twelfth century. While the annals cannot be relied upon at such an early date, the core of their account, a war between Coirpre and his sons and Fincath and his sons, as well as the association with Tailtiu and Granard, while a tradition, is likely to be one. Byrne, however, raises a note of caution: "It is true, however, that the names of Coirpre, Fiachu, Maine and Lóegaire continue to be used in later centuries simply to denote the kingdoms or dynasties descended from those sons of Niall, just as we find the names Benjamin, Dan or Juda similarly used in the Bible ...".

== Rewriting history ==
Late writings of doubtful reliability say that Coirpre's mother was Rígnach ingen Meadaib. His son Eochu appears in the annals, but not in the most comprehensive genealogical collection. Another son, Cormac, is said to be Túathal Máelgarb's father Cormac Cáech, although Tiréchan's account of Saint Patrick cursing Coirpre's descendants may make this a late addition. A third son, Cal, is a spurious late addition.

Apart from Coirpre himself and his putative grandson Túathal Máelgarb, no king of Cenél Coirpri is included in later lists of High Kings of Ireland. Later kings of Cenél Coirpri are mentioned in the Annals of Ulster and other Irish annals with some frequency, although usually only to report their deaths.

In earlier historical times, Cenél Coirpri may have been of sufficient importance to attract the attention of largely hostile writers. Tirechán's life of Patrick states that Coirpre was cursed by the saint, at Tailtiu, so that none of his descendants would be High King. The obvious omission, an explanation for the rule of Túathal Máelgarb, was corrected by later hagiographers. In the earliest surviving list, that in the Baile Chuind, Túathal appears not under his own name but as the kenning Óengarb. Túathal Máelgarb is portrayed in a poor light by later writers dealing with the life of Diarmait mac Cerbaill. Diarmait's descendants, Clann Cholmáin and the Síl nÁedo Sláine, probably replaced the kindreds of Coirpre and Fiachu as the dominant families of the Irish midlands. Coirpre himself, while excluded from later synthetic lists of kings of Tara or High Kings of Ireland, is included in the early Baile Chuind, coming between Lóegaire and Lugaide.
