= Lyons Hill =

Lyons Liamhain
- Townland
- Location in Ireland
- Coordinates: 53°17′58″N 6°33′25″W
- Country: Ireland
- Province: Leinster
- County: County Kildare
- Time zone: UTC+0 (WET)
  - Summer (DST): UTC-1 (IST (WEST))

Lyons Hill or Lyons (Irish: Liamhain) is a townland and restored village in County Kildare. At a time when canal passenger boats travelled at 3 mph (4.8 km/h), Lyons was the nearest overnight stop to Dublin on the Grand Canal. On the hilltop is a trigonometrical point used by Ireland's Ordnance Survey. The name derives from the Irish language name for an elm tree, Liamhan.

== History ==
Four families (FitzDermot, Tyrrell, Aylmer and Lawless), have held possession of Lyons through most of its history.

=== Royal seat ===
Lyons Hill, a hill within the townland, was the inauguration site for members of one of three septs of the Uí Dúnlainge dynasty which rotated the kingship of Leinster between 750 and 1050, after which the family became Normanised as the FitzDermots. In that period 10 Uí Dúnchada Kings of Leinster established their base at Lyons. Their influence helped secure a placemyth for Cnoch Liamhna among 300 locations featured in Dinnshenchas Érenn, the poem Liamuin. The Toraíocht of Liamuin was based on the mythical pursuit of a beautiful daughter of King Dúbhthach Dubthaire. The Lyons kings were:

- 760–776 Cellach. Cellach mac Dunchad,
- 795–808 Finsnechta. Finsnechta Cethardec mac Cellach,
- 854–62 Ruarc. Ruarc mac Bran,
- 884–85 Muiredach. Muiredach mac Bran,
- 917–23 Fáelán. Faelan mac Muiredach,
- 942–43 Lorcán. Lorcan mac Faelan,
- 958–66 Cellach. Cellach mac Faelan,
- 978–84 Domnall Claen. Domnall Claen mac Lorcan,
- 984–1003 Donnchad. Donnchad mac Domnall Claen.

=== Royal family ===
The arrangement of the three septs of the Uí Dúnlainge to exchange the kingship of Leinster in rotation was almost unique in Irish history. It meant that by the end of the three-century arrangement, monarchs who were seventh cousins were swapping the kingship. By then the dynasty, traditionally clients of the Uí Néill, had become weakened by the battle for control of the region between Brian Bóruma of Dál Cais, the Uí Néill king Máel Sechnaill mac Domnaill and the Viking kingdom of Dublin, as well as the Uí Chennselaig of South Leinster.

The Uí Dúnchada dynasty held an important ecclesiastical role within the triumvirate, the Abbacy of Kildare, and Muiredach was simultaneously abbot and Kings of Leinster. The Uí Néill clientship dates to 806 when High King Aed Oirdnide mac Néill invaded Leinster and deposed Finsnechtae. Finsnechtae regained the kingdom, presumably with Uí Néill support until his death in 808 causing dynastic strife and a further invasion of the High King. Muirchertach mac Néill, King of Aileach, paid an official visit to Cnoch Liamhna in 941. After Cellach's death, the dynasty was weakened by dynastic rivalry with the Uí Chennselaig, from whom the Uí Dúnlainge had captured the Kingship of Leinster, and incursions from the Vikings in Dublin. Domnall Claen mac Lorcáin, who had according to the Annals of Ulster "deceitfully killed" Murchad mac Finn in 972 was taken prisoner in 978 by the Danes of Dublin and had to be freed by the intervention of former High King Máel Sechnaill. After he was killed by the Uí Chennselaig in 984, his son Donchada assumed the kingship and began a nine-year rivalry with his Uí Fáeláin rival, Máel Mórda mac Murchada and the Vikings of Dublin.

=== Battleground ===
This rivalry was responsible for provoking a war between Máel Sechnaill mac Domnaill (948–1022), and Brian Bóruma (c. 941–1014) for supremacy and the High Kingship. It began in earnest in 999 when Donnchad mac Domnaill Claen was captured by Máel Mórda and his nephew Sitric Silkbeard, the son of Olaf Cuaran. This was a challenge to Máel Sechnaill, as the province's overlord, and he ravaged Leinster. Brian saw an opportunity to intrude into Leinster's affairs, and late in the year, he led an army there which defeated the combined forces of Leinster and Dublin at the battle of Glenn Máma, on a site to the east of Oughterard Hill adjoining Lyons between Castlewarden and Windmill hill. It is noted as one of the few occasions when Brian engaged in open battle. Brian captured Dublin on New Year's Day 1000 and at Athlone in 1002 took the hostages of Connacht and Meath thus ending Máel Sechnaill's first possession of the high-kingship.

When Brian Bóruma campaigned again in Leinster in 1003, he deposed Donncha and set up in his stead an Uí Fáeláin rival, Máel Mórda mac Murchada. Ironically Mael Morda was to become Brian's foe and opponent at the Battle of Clontarf (1014). After Clontarf, the Kingship of the Uí Dúnlainge was held by the Uí Muiredaig and shortly afterwards the Kingship of Leinster reverted from the Uí Dúnlainge to the Uí Chennselaig dynasty based in Ferns, County Wexford.

=== FitzDermot family ===
After the Norman invasion the Uí Dúnchada accepted Norman title and land grant and became the FitzDermot family. Carn Uí Dúnchada in Dublin was named for them and they later settled in Rathdown in South Dublin and North Wicklow.

=== Manor and parish ===
Norman Lyons became an important manor, castle and parish. Anglicised names which occur in the calendar rolls are Lewan (Calendar of State papers) in 1217, Leuan in 1223, 1224, 1225, 1228, 1230 and 1260, Lyons in 1272, Lyons (Ecclesiastical Tax 1322), Lyons in 1332 (listed as "burned by the O'Tooles" in the Book of Howth), as Lions (Calendar of Carew MS 1535 and 1537) and eventually as Lyons after 1541. Lyons church, now a mausoleum for the Lawless family, was constructed around 1350. It has intricate carvings and a stone commemorating the marriage of Richard Aylmer to Eleanor Tyrrell in 1548. Lyons parish was united with the parish of Oughterard in 1541 and with Kill in 1691, although it remained the headquarters of the Catholic parish until 1817. The oldest headstone in Lyons churchyard dates to 1693, dedicated to Edmond Moore and his son James. Royal manors were created in Oughterard on an adjoining hill and Newcastle-Lyons, below the hill within the County Dublin boundary created in 1210. Newcastle-Lyons developed as a separate medieval town and was granted two seats in the Irish parliament in 1606. The seats were purchased by the Latouche family before the suppression of the Irish House of Commons in 1800.

=== Medieval wars ===
Sir William Brereton, (d. 1541?), used Lyons as a military base for his campaigns during Silken Thomas rebellion in 1535. The original Lyons house and town were burned in 1641 on the orders of Lord Justice William Parsons (c.1570–1650), who ironically had sat for the borough of Newcastle-Lyons in the 1613–15 parliament, and his colleague Sir John Borlase.

=== Clonaghlis church and parish ===
Clonaghlis graveyard within the Lyons estate is also the seat of a former parish associated with female saints Fedhlim and Mughain. The Calendar Rolls record that Peter de Laermerd granted the Church of Clonacles to St Thomas Abbey near Dublin in 1206 and that in 1336 John Plunkett sued Hugh de Blound of Rathregan County Meath, for the Manor of Cluinaghlys, in possession of his grandfather Walter Plunkett and passed down by his father Henry Plunkett. Nothing remains of the church but some scattered stones, and the oldest headstone in Clonaghlis graveyard, still in use by local people, dates to 1729. Aviation pioneer Tony Ryan was buried in the graveyard after his death in 2007.

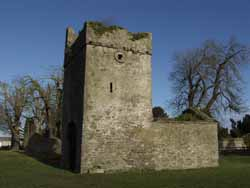
Lyons Castle

=== Lyons House ===
Michael Aylmer inherited the estate at the age of four in 1733 and became indebted to banker Nicholas Lawless (later Baron Cloncurry), eventually losing the house in 1796. First Nicholas Lawless (construction during 1786) and his son Valentine (construction 1804–10) combined to build a large country house in its own gardens, decorated in the Directoire style, of which there are few examples in Ireland, and with a private lake. Valentine Lawless, after 1799 the second Lord Cloncurry, spent £200,000 on renovation including frescoes by Gaspare Gabrielli and three shiploads of classical art imported from Italy. A fourth shipment was lost when it sank off Wicklow. Treasures which were successfully imported include three columns from the ruins of the Golden House of Nero in Rome, used in the portico, and a statue of Venus excavated at Ostia. His son, the third Lord Cloncurry, committed suicide in 1869 by throwing himself out of a third-floor window at Lyons

=== Grand Canal ===
When work on the Grand Canal began in 1756 Ardclough was one of the first sections to be dug. The canal reached Ardclough in 1763, when the 13th lock, a 137 feet (42 m) double lock built with Pozzuolona mortar, was opened, following the ambitious design of the canal's original engineer, Thomas Omer. When a new engineer, John Trail took over construction of the canal in 1768, the proposed canal capacity was reduced from 170-ton barges to 40-ton barges.

=== Thirteenth lock ===
Canal records show that "Lyons or Clonaughles lock" was reduced in size in 1783, but the canal through the thirteenth lock serves as a reminder of Omer's original plan, 20 feet (6.1 m) wide, compared with the 14 feet (4.3 m) width adopted by Trail. Ardclough bridge was named in original plans for the Bruton family of Clonaghlis but constructed with a nameplate bearing the name of the Henry family of Straffan.

From 1777 a local river, the Morrel was proposed as a water feeder for the canal, construction resumed and the first passenger boats were towed to Sallins in February 1779.

=== Lock yard ===
Local landowner Lord Cloncurry (1773–1853) was a canal enthusiast, constructing the Lyons mill and lockyard village complex in the 1820s and serving as chairman of the Grand Canal Company five times during his lifetime. The canal was an important, if slow, passenger thoroughfare feeding passengers to John Barry's hotel at Lyons.

Historical population
Year	Pop.	±%
1821	536	—
1831	158	−70.5%
1841	379	+139.9%
1851	308	−18.7%
1861	310	+0.6%
1871	288	−7.1%
1881	286	−0.7%
1891	222	−22.4%
1901	172	−22.5%
1911	163	−5.2%

When in 1834 Flyboats increased the average speed for passenger boats from 3 mph (4.8 km/h) to 9 mph (14 km/h) Ireland's first railway was already under construction. The canal peaked at 120,615 passengers in 1846, the year construction started on the Dublin-Cork railway line. When a Dublin-Galway railway line was opened in 1850 the closure of the rarely profitable passenger service followed in 1852.

Cargo traffic continued to use the canal for another 108 years, peaking at 379.045 tons in 1865 when an average of 90 barges a day passed through Ardclough. The canal was motorised 1911–24 and closed to cargo in 1960, but is still a popular thoroughfare for leisure boats. The tracks of the ropes of the horse-drawn barges can still be traced at Ardclough canal bridge.

=== Economy ===
With the accidental burning of the mill in 1903 and the decline of the estate after the Cloncurry title became extinct, the area went into decline. Lyons estate was sold to UCD as an agricultural campus in 1962. In 1990 it was purchased by Michael Smurfit and in 1996 resold.

=== Artistic life ===
John Betjeman's (1906–1984) ode to a Lake was based on his stay in Lyons in 1958. Writer Emily Lawless (1845–1913) spent part of her childhood in Lyons house. Lydia Shackleton (1828–1914), botanical artist, lived in Lyons between April 1853 when she moved to the family's newly acquired mill at the 13th lock, where she was the housekeeper for her elder brother Joseph, until 1860.

== Developments ==
=== Restoration ===
The fabric of the buildings in the lockyard beside the 13th Lock date to the 1820s and represent an important industrial heritage site. In the period after the burning of the mill and especially after the 1950s the buildings were allowed to fall into disrepair. Thanks to the interest of the owner of Lyons House Ryanair founder Tony Ryan (1936–2007), Lyons lockyard village was redeveloped and restored between 1999 and 2008.

The first phase, set around formal gardens and an artificial lake, was reopened in August 2006. The mill building was converted into a restaurant from 2006 until 2008. A second restaurant, La Serre, continued to serve meals. The mill building, called Shackleton House, is used as a venue for parties and corporate events.

=== Modern village ===
Lyons village, located at 53°17′58″N 6°33′25″W, was restored 1999–2007 from a deserted and depopulated state by the aviation pioneer Tony Ryan (1936–2007), and contains his mausoleum. The village consists of apartments based in the former canal-side industrial heritage buildings dating to the 1820s, a small chapel, and Café la Serre. Between 2006 and 2008, another restaurant, The Mill, was run at the site by Irish celebrity chef Richard Corrigan. Other artisans dwellings were to be restored in the third phase of the scheme, 2007–2011. The development is beside the 13th lock on the Grand Canal and approached from a separate entrance to the entrance of Lyons House beside Kearneystown Bridge on the road from Newcastle to Ardclough.

== Bibliography ==
- W J Fitzpatrick: Life, Times and Contemporaries of Lord Cloncurry (1855). (Online version available)
- Valentine Lawless, Personal recollections of the life and times, with extracts from the correspondence of Valentine Lord Cloncurry, Dublin: J. McGlashan; London: W.S. Orr, 1849. (Online version available)
- Lyons House: A Guide (2001).
- Annals of Ardclough by Eoghan Corry and Jim Tancred (2004).
- Ardclough Churches 1985 Souvenir Brochure.
