= Arklow (barony) =

Arklow An tInbhear Mór (Irish)
- Barony
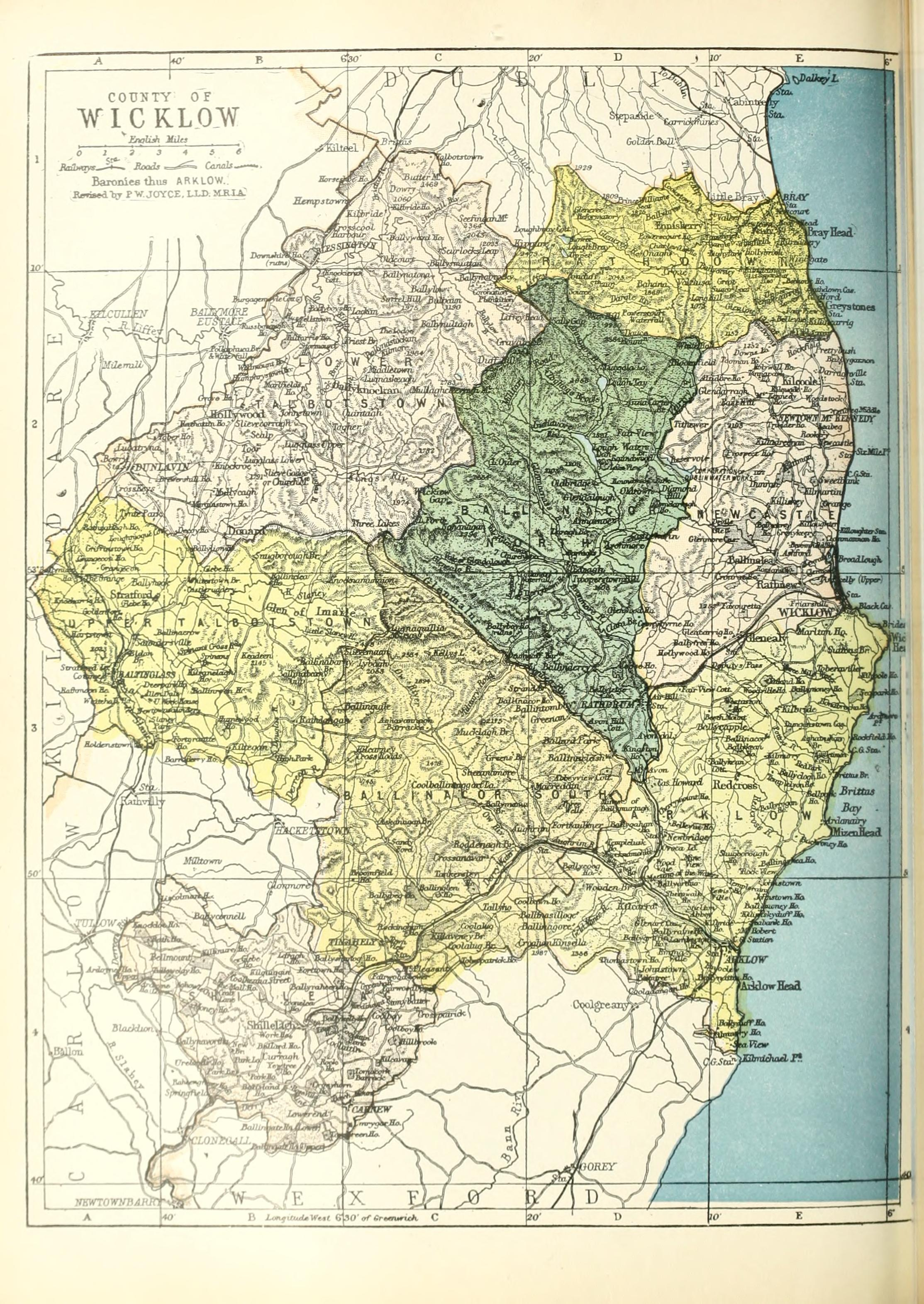
- Baronies of County Wicklow. Arklow is in the southeast.
- Coordinates: 52°51′38″N 6°09′47″W
- Sovereign state: Ireland
- County: Wicklow

Area
  - Total: 271.06 km^{2} (104.66 sq mi)

Arklow (Irish: An tInbhear Mór) is a barony in County Wicklow, Ireland.

== Etymology ==
Arklow barony derives its name from the town of Arklow (from Old Norse Arnkells Lág, "Arnkell's land". The Irish name means "large estuary.")

== Location ==
Arklow barony is located in southeastern County Wicklow, opening onto the Irish Sea, containing Wicklow Head, Mizen Head and Arklow Head.

== History ==
The Uí Garrchon in the north and the Uí Enechglaiss in the south are noted in Arklow barony from about the 7th century. This was part of Ó Broin country after the 12th century, referred to as Crioch Branach.

== List of settlements ==
Below is a list of settlements in Arklow barony:

- Arklow
- Glenealy (southern part)
- Redcross
