= Domnall Claen =

10th-century king of Leinster

Domnall mac Lorcáin (died 984), called Dómnall Claen or Domnall Clóen (Domnall the Squinting), was king of Leinster, the south-eastern province of Ireland.

Domnall was a son of Lorcán mac Fáelán and belonged to the Uí Dúnchada branch of the Uí Dúnlainge dynasty which dominated Leinster from the 8th to the early 11th century. Domnall became king in 978 following the death of Úgaire mac Túathail of the Uí Muiredaig branch of the dynasty in battle at Belan, in modern County Kildare, fighting against the Norse-Gaels of Dublin. Domnall had earlier come to the attention of the Irish annals when, in 972, he had murdered the then-king of Leinster, Murchad mac Finn of the third, Uí Fháeláin, branch of Uí Dúnlainge. The killing had been done "deceitfully" according to the Annals of Ulster.

In 979, Domnall was captured in unknown circumstances by the Dubliners. Hudson suggests that this may have been in the nature of a personal vendetta by the Dublin king, Amlaíb Cuarán, son-in-law of that Murchad mac Finn killed by Domnall in 972. He was freed in 980 following the defeat of the Dubliners by Máel Sechnaill mac Domnaill, the High King of Ireland.

Three years later Domnall was allied with Ivar of Waterford against Máel Sechnaill and the new king of Dublin, Máel Sechnaill's half-brother Glúniairn. Domnall and Ivar were routed in battle and Máel Sechnaill ravaged Leinster.

The following year, 984, Domnall was killed by the Uí Cheinnselaig of southern Leinster, Uí Dúnlainge's chief rivals within the province. The Annals of Tigernach add that Áed son of Echtigern was responsible. Domnall was succeeded as king of Leinster by a son, Donnchad.
