= Faelan mac Muiredach =

King of Leinster

Faelán mac Muiredach (Fáeláin) (died 942) was a King of Leinster in Ireland, from 917 until his death in 942. He was a member of the Uí Dúnchada, a sept of the Uí Dúnlainge dynasty. Faelan mac Muiredach, was the son of Muiredach mac Brain, who was king of Leinster 884–885. Muiredach was the son of Bran mac Fáeláin, who had been king 834 to 838. They had a family history of Kings of Leinster going back to 495.
