= Domnall mac Muirecáin =

Domnall mac Muirecáin (died 884) was a King of Leinster of the Uí Fáeláin sept of the Uí Dúnlainge branch of the Laigin. This sept had their royal seat at Naas in the eastern part of the Liffey plain, Airthir Liphi. He was the son of Muirecán mac Diarmata (died 863), a previous king.

There is much confusion in the king lists during this period for Leinster. Francis John Byrne suggests that the root of this apparent confusion lay in the fact that the Uí Dúnlainge kings exercised little real authority due to the aggressions of their western neighbour Cerball mac Dúnlainge (died 888), King of Osraige. Cerball, while unable to install himself as king of Leinster, was able to prevent any rival king exercising real power there.

Domnall would have succeeded his father as head of the Uí Fáeláin sept in 863. His predecessor as King of Leinster, Ailill mac Dúnlainge of the Uí Muiredaig sept had died in 871, however Muiredach mac Brain (died 885) of the Uí Dúnchada sept is associated with the Leinster forces in association with events in 870 and 875. According to the Chronicum Scotorum and other Irish annals, Domnall assumed the kingship of Leinster in 880. This would place his effective reign in 880-884.

In 874 the high king Áed Findliath (died 879) had invaded Leinster in an attempt to impose his authority and he plundered the country and burned churches including Cell Ausili. In 880 the new High King Flann Sinna (died 916) attacked Leinster and took hostages imposing his authority.

In 884 Domnall was killed by his own associates. His brother Cerball mac Muirecáin (died 909) became King of Leinster in 885.
