= Bran Becc mac Murchada =

Bran Becc mac Murchada (died 738) was a King of Leinster from the Uí Dúnlainge branch of the Laigin. He was the son of Murchad mac Brain Mut (died 727), a previous king. He ruled briefly in 738.

The Annals of Tigernach claim that in 738 Cathal mac Finguine (died 742), king of Munster led a hosting into Leinster and took hostages and treasure from Bran. However, the Annals of Ulster claim that it was his brother Fáelán mac Murchada (died 738) who gave the hostages which is more likely. Bran Becc is referred to as king in the king lists of the Book of Leinster which ignore Áed mac Colggen (died 738) of the Uí Cheinnselaig who was more likely king at this time.

Bran and Áed, along with many other kings, were killed in battle against the high king Áed Allán mac Fergaile of the Cenél nEógain at the Battle of Áth Senaig (Ballyshannon, Co.Kildare) in 738. This fight known as the battle of the groans is described at length in the Irish annals. The Annals of Ulster say:

And men say that so many fell in this great battle that we find no comparable slaughter in a single onslaught and fierce conflict throughout all preceding ages.

== See also ==
- Kings of Leinster
