= Muiredach mac Murchada =

Muiredach mac Murchada (died 760) was a King of Leinster from the Uí Dúnlainge branch of the Laigin. He was the son of Murchad mac Brain Mut (died 727), a previous king. He ruled from 738 to 760.

The Laigin had suffered a crushing defeat at the Battle of Áth Senaig (Ballyshannon, County Kildare) in 738 at the hands of the High King Áed Allán mac Fergaile (died 743) of the Cenél nEógain. Muiredach maintained good relations the High King of Ireland, Domnall Midi (died 763) of the Clann Cholmáin. Muiredach's son Bran Ardchenn mac Muiredaig (died 795) married Domnall Midi's daughter Eithne. In 759 Domnall led a host of the Laigin as far as Mag Muirtheimne, near Dundalk.

The Uí Máil branch of the Laigin had at times held the kingship of Leinster; the last being Cellach Cualann mac Gerthidi (died 715). In 744 the final attempt by the Uí Máil was defeated at the Battle of Ailén dá Berrach in Cualu, a district in County Wicklow. Two of Cellach's grandsons, Cathal and Ailill, were slain.

The Osraige king Amchaid mac Con Cherca also attacked Fotharta Fea (754), and the southern Laigin, the Uí Bairrche and Uí Cheinnselaig during Muiredach's reign.

Muiredach was ancestor of the Uí Muiredaig sept of the Uí Dunlainge with their royal seat at Maistiu (Mullaghmast) in south Kildare, in the territory known as Iarthair Liphi (western Liffey). His son Bran Ardchenn mac Muiredaig (died 795) was also king of Leinster.
