= Lorcán mac Fáelán =

Lorcán mac Faelán was the seventh of ten Kings of Leinster to be inaugurated and based on Lyons Hill, Ardclough, County Kildare, a member of the Uí Dúnchada, one of three septs of the Uí Dúnlainge dynasty which rotated the kingship of Leinster between 750 and 1050, significant in County Kildare History.
