= Donnchad mac Domnall Claen =

Donnchad mac Dómnaill Clóen was the tenth and last King of Leinster to be inaugurated and based on Lyons Hill, Ardclough, County Kildare. He was a member of the Uí Dúnchada, one of three septs of the Uí Dúnlainge dynasty which rotated the kingship of Leinster between 750 - 1050 and is a significant figure in County Kildare History. He was deposed in 1003. Máel Mórda mac Murchada of the Uí Fáeláin sept replaced him as king.

== Primary Source ==
According to the Annals of Tigernach, in the year 999AD:

- T999.1 Donnchadh son of Domhnall Claon, king of Leinster, was captured by Sitric son of Olaf.
