= Fincath mac Garrchu =

Fincath mac Garrchu (or Findchad mac Garrchon) (died 485) was a king of Leinster. He was a member of the Dál Messin Corb dynasty's principal sub-sept, the Uí Garrchon. He was the son of the founder of this sept Garrchú mac Fothaid.

Not mentioned as king in the Book of Leinster, he is however given this title in the Annals of Innisfallen. He was defeated and killed in the first Battle of Grainaret in 485 by the Uí Néill. The victor of this battle is variously given as Coirpre mac Néill or Muirchertach mac Ercae. Coipre mac Neill was probably the victor and it may record the conquest of north Tethbae and that it was fought near Granard (County Longford)

He was succeeded by his son, Fráech mac Finchada (died 495).

== See also ==
- Kings of Leinster
