= Dúnlaing mac Muiredaig =

King of Leinster (9th century Ireland)

Dúnlaing mac Muiredaig (died 869) was a King of Leinster of the Uí Muiredaig sept of the Uí Dúnlainge branch of the Laigin. This sept had their royal seat at Maistiu (Mullaghmast) in South Kildare. He was the son of Muiredach mac Brain (died 818), a previous king. He ruled from 863 to 869.

There is much confusion in the king lists during this period for Leinster. Between 838 and 871 the title King of Leinster is not recorded in the Annals of Ulster. The death of Dúnlaing is not recorded in this annal but is recorded in other annals. Francis John Byrne suggests that the root of this apparent confusion lay in the fact that the Uí Dúnlainge kings exercised little real authority due to the aggressions of their western neighbour Cerball mac Dúnlainge (died 888), King of Osraige. Cerball, while unable to install himself as king of Leinster, was able to prevent any rival king exercising real power there.

In 868 the annals record that the Laigin participated with the Uí Néill of Brega and Norse at the Battle of Cell Ua nDaigri on the Boyne estuary. They were defeated by the high king Áed Findliath (died 879). Dúnlaing's name is not mentioned with connection to this event.

His son Ailill mac Dúnlainge (died 871) was also a King of Leinster. Another son Cairpre mac Dúnlainge (died 884) was King of Iarthair Liffey or western Liffey.
