= Ruarc mac Brain =

Ruarc mac Brain (died 862) was the fourth of ten Kings of Leinster to be inaugurated and based on Lyons Hill, Ardclough, County Kildare, a member of the Uí Dúnchada, one of three septs of the Uí Dúnlainge dynasty which rotated the kingship of Leinster between 750 and 1050, significant in County Kildare History.

One of two sons of Bran mac Fáeláin to be counted as king, the succession of kings in Leinster is difficult to follow in his time. The king lists have Ruarc succeed his father, and be followed by Lorcán mac Cellaig, and then Túathal mac Máele-Brigte and lastly Muirecán mac Diarmata, who died the year after Ruarc.

In 843 the Annals of Ulster record that Artacán mac Domnaill was "deceitfully killed" by Ruarc mac Brain, but no further identification or titles are given. Likewise in 846, when he fought alongside Máel Sechnaill mac Máele Ruanaid and was defeated by Tigernach mac Fócartai no titles are given. His obituary in the Annals of Ulster in 862 calls him only "king of Uí Dúnlainge". The Annals of the Four Masters add that he was killed by the Uí Néill, the leadership of which passed in theory from Máel Sechnaill to Áed Findliath that same year at Máel Sechnaill's death, and perhaps in practice rather earlier.

Other entries in the Irish annals conflict with the regular succession shown in the king lists. In 848, when reporting one of the several defeats of Vikings that year, at Sciath Nechtain, near modern Castledermot, County Kildare, the Annals of Ulster say that the Leinstermen were led by Lorcán. In 854 Tuathal is called "king of Uí Dúnlainge" in the notice of his death and Muirecán is "king of Naas" in 863. Byrne suggests that the root of this apparent confusion lay in the fact that the Uí Dúnlainge kings exercised little real authority due to the aggressions of their western neighbour Cerball mac Dúnlainge, King of Osraige. Cerball, while unable to install himself as king of Leinster, was able to prevent any rival king exercising real power there.
