= Bran Mut mac Conaill =

Bran Mut mac Conaill (died 693) was a king of Leinster from the Uí Dúnlainge branch of the Laigin. He was the grandson of Fáelán mac Colmáin (died 666), a previous king. He ruled from 680 to 693.

According to the saga Bóroma ("The Cattle Tribute"), it is mentioned that the high king Fínsnechta Fledach (d. 695) of the Síl nÁedo Sláine undertook an expedition against Leinster when the Laigin refused to pay the cattle tribute. Bran Mut assembled the Leinster forces and sent Saint Moling (died 697), the abbot of Ferns, to negotiate with Fisnechta. Moling tricked Fisnechta into remitting the tribute.

By his wife Almaith ingen Blathmac of the Cenél Loairn of the Dál Riata, he had a son Murchad mac Brain Mut (d. 727) who was a king of Leinster.

== See also ==
- List of kings of Leinster
