= Uí Enechglaiss =

Irish family

The Ui Enechglaiss were a dynasty attested in 5th-century Ireland, who provided some of the early kings of Laigin.

== Background ==
The dynasty were initially based on the plains of Kildare around Naas, (Devane, 2005, believes that they were based at Carbury Hill) but were forced east over the Wicklow Mountains by the invasions and conquests by the Uí Néill in the first half of the 6th century. An ogham stone from south of Slane in County Meath points to a connection with that area. They became a politically unimportant people, situated between the Dal Messin Corb and the Ui Dega, on the coast of County Wicklow, based around Arklow. In the 11th century, their rulers adopted the surname Ua Fiachraige, now rendered as O'Fieghraie, O'Feary and Feary.

== Heartland ==
Devane (p. 187, 2005) believes that "the heartland of Ui Enechglaiss [was] in Carbury, Co. Kildare, before dislocation either by Coirpre, son of Niall, or by his sons in the late 5th/early 6th century." She goes on to state that, by inference of the sources, "the Dál Messin Corb (a branch of the Uí Enechglaiss) was, in fact, dominant in north Leinster in the 5th century and was to the fore in the defence of the province against Coirpre and Ui Neill. This view is supported by the 'Vita Tripartia', in which Saint Patrick, or more likely Palladius, encountered members of the Uí Garrchon soon after his arrival in Ireland. The meeting took place in the vicinity of Naas, which is situated in Mag Liphi (the Liffy Plain), then heartland of political power in north Leinster."

== Notables ==
Mac Cairthinn mac Coelboth, who was killed at the battle of Fremen in 446, was King of Leinster and one of the earliest historically attested Irish kings.

The poet Dubhthach moccu Lughair was a native of Gorey, though he lived some sixty years prior to the dynasty's removal to the area.

== Septs ==
A number of septs of the Ui Enechglais were the following:

- Ui Chuanach - descended from Cuanu mac Mael Aithgean, a gr.gr.gr.-grandson of Finchad mac Breasal Enechglas
- Ui Thairmeisc - descended from Tairmesc mac Scandlan, gr.gr.gr.-grandson of Finchad mac Breasal Enechglas
- Ui Muirenaig - descended from Emmal mac Breasal Enechglas
- Sil nDiocolla meic Eogain - from Dicuill mac Eogan, gr.gr.gr.-grandson of Nath I mac Breasal Enechglas
- Ui Meic Fhirithe - from Daurthecht mac Breasal Enechglas
- Ui Ailella - also descended from Daurthecht
- Ui Fergnae - from Nannaid mac Breasal Enechglas
- Ui Fiachrach - from Fiachra mac Finsnechta, fl. 984

== Ui Enechglais genealogy ==
 Ui Enechglais
 |
 |
 Cathair mar
 |
 |
 Bressal Enechglas
 |
 |______________________________________________
 |           |        |          |           |
 |           |        |          |           | 
 Finchad    Emmal   Nath I   Daurthecht    Nannaid

== Ua/O Feary genealogy ==
Dicuill mac Eogan m. Berach m. Muiredach m. Amlagaid m. Nath I m. Bressal Enechglas
|
Mael Doborchon
|________________________
|                      |
Tuaimmin               Cu Dobur
|                      |
Dungalach              Conmael   
|                      |
Dunlang                Dub da Leithe
|                      |
Dunchad                Rudgus
|                      |
Fiachra                Dungalach
|                      |
Cathal                 Cinaed
|
Cinaed, died 917
|
Finsnechta
|
Fiachra, fl. 984, a quo Ua/O Fiachraige
|
Dunlang
|
Gilla Coemgin
|
Cu Mara 
|
Gilla Coemgin
