= Vitus (magister militum) =

Vitus was a Western Roman general appointed to the position of magister utriusque militiae and sent to recover Spain from Rechila's Suebi in 446. He led a combined Romano-Visigothic army into Carthaginiensis and Baetica, but his force was routed when it met the Suebi in battle.
