= 446 =

446 in various calendars
- Gregorian calendar: 446; CDXLVI
- Ab urbe condita: 1199
- Assyrian calendar: 5196
- Balinese saka calendar: 367–368
- Bengali calendar: −148 – −147
- Berber calendar: 1396
- Buddhist calendar: 990
- Burmese calendar: −192
- Byzantine calendar: 5954–5955
- Chinese calendar: 乙酉年 (Wood Rooster); 3143 or 2936 — to — 丙戌年 (Fire Dog); 3144 or 2937
- Coptic calendar: 162–163
- Discordian calendar: 1612
- Ethiopian calendar: 438–439
- Hebrew calendar: 4206–4207
- Hindu calendars
- Vikram Samvat: 502–503
- Shaka Samvat: 367–368
- Kali Yuga: 3546–3547
- Holocene calendar: 10446
- Iranian calendar: 176 BP – 175 BP
- Islamic calendar: 181 BH – 180 BH
- Javanese calendar: 330–331
- Julian calendar: 446; CDXLVI
- Korean calendar: 2779
- Minguo calendar: 1466 before ROC 民前1466年
- Nanakshahi calendar: −1022
- Seleucid era: 757/758 AG
- Thai solar calendar: 988–989
- Tibetan calendar: ཤིང་མོ་བྱ་ལོ་ (female Wood-Bird); 572 or 191 or −581 — to — མེ་ཕོ་ཁྱི་ལོ་ (male Fire-Dog); 573 or 192 or −580

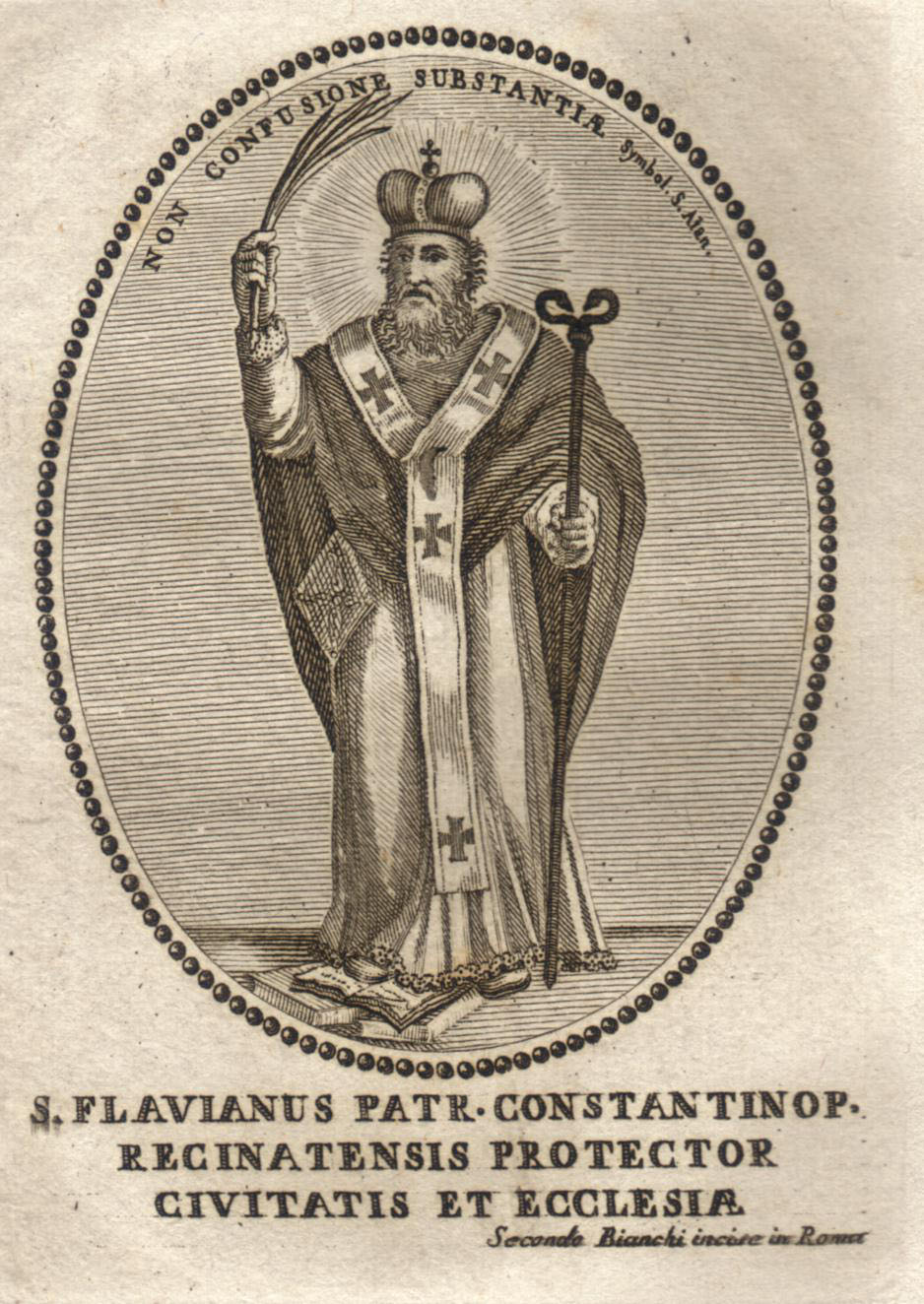
Saint Flavian of Constantinople

Year 446 (CDXLVI) was a common year starting on Tuesday of the Julian calendar. At the time, it was known as the Year of the Consulship of Aetius and Symmachus (or, less frequently, year 1199 Ab urbe condita). The denomination 446 for this year has been used since the early medieval period, when the Anno Domini calendar era became the prevalent method in Europe for naming years.

== Events ==
=== By place ===
==== Europe ====
- Bishop Germanus of Auxerre visits Ravenna, seeking to soften imperial hostility towards the Bagaudae. On his arrival at the capital, empress-mother Galla Placidia sends him a silver dish with a choice selection of prepared dainties—all vegetarian, out of respect for the bishop's strict diet. Germanus petitions the Senate for leniency for the citizens of Armorica (Brittany).
- The Britons and Anglo-Saxon mercenaries, under King Vortigern, appeal to Flavius Aetius (magister militum of Gaul) for military assistance in their struggle against the Picts and Irish. Aetius has enough problems with Attila the Hun and is unable to send any help (according to Groans of the Britons).
- The Cor Tewdws (College of Theodosius), Llantwit Major (Wales), is supposedly burned down by Irish pirates.

==== China ====
- Three Disasters of Wu: The Northern Wei dynasty begins persecuting Buddhists, having heretofore encouraged them. The drain of manpower and tax money to temples and monasteries has threatened the secular government, and the reaction is fierce: monks and nuns are murdered, temples and icons destroyed. All men under age 50 are prohibited from joining any monastic order in a program that will continue until 450, helping the Confucianist philosophy of the Han dynasty to gain dominance over Buddhism.

=== By topic ===
==== Religion ====
- A local synod is held by Turibius of Astorga.
- Flavian becomes patriarch of Constantinople.

== Deaths ==
- February 19 – Leontius of Trier, Bishop of Trier
- Mac Cairthinn mac Coelboth, king of Leinster (Ireland)
- Proclus, patriarch of Constantinople (approximate date)
