= Feary =

Feary is a surname. Notable people with the surname include:

- Bert Feary (1885–1952), New Zealand rugby league footballer
- Frederick Feary (1912–1994), American boxer
- John Feary (c. 1745–1788), British landscape painter
- Mackey Feary (1955–1999), American musician
