= Echu mac Muiredaig =

Irish king

Echu mac Muiredaig (flourished mid 6th century) was a king of the Uí Cheinnselaig of South Leinster. His father, Muiredach mac Óengusa and grandfather Óengus mac Feidlimid had been kings of the Ui Cheinnselaig as well. They belonged to a branch known as the Uí Felmeda descended from Fedelmid, son of Énnae Cennsalach, who was the father of Óengus.

He is listed in the king list in the Book of Leinster but is not mentioned in the annals. An 11th-century poem Gein Branduib maic Echach ocus Aedáin maic Gabráin (The Birth of Brandub son of Eochu and of Aedán son of Gabrán) mentions that Echu was expelled from Leinster by his brother Fáelán and went to the court of Gabrán mac Domangairt, king of Dál Riata in Scotland. The king list in the Book of Leinster mentions a Fáelán mac Síláin as king prior to Echu from a rival line descended from Crimthann mac Énnai (died 483). Echu later returned to take the throne though it is not mentioned in what manner he did so.

The poem goes on to relate that Echu's wife, named Feidelm agreed to exchange one of her twin sons at birth for one of the twin daughters of Gabran so that Gabran could have a son. These boys were Brandub mac Echach (died 603) and Áedán mac Gabráin. The date of the poem coincides with a period of Scottish and Leinster cooperation and could be political propaganda. A foster-brother relationship may be implied. Echu's son Brandub would go on to become King of Leinster and halt the expansion of the southern Ui Neill.
