= Art Buidhe Mac Murchadha Caomhánach =

Art Buidhe Mac Murchadha Caomhánach was a king was known as "Art the Yellow" who ruled Leinster from 1511 to 1518. He was succeeded by his brother Gerald of Ferns.
