= Murchad mac Brain Mut =

Murchad mac Brain Mut (died 727) was a King of Leinster from the Uí Dúnlainge branch of the Laigin. He was the son of Bran Mut mac Conaill (died 696), a previous king. He ruled from 715 to 727.

== His reign ==
His first mention in the annals is when he began his reign by an inaugural raid into Munster to Cashel in 715. His reign saw warfare with the Ui Neill and in 719 they harried Leinster 5 times. Murchad aligned himself with the pretensions of Cathal mac Finguine (died 742), the King of Munster and in 721 they harried Brega together. However Cathal made peace with the high king Fergal mac Máele Dúin (died 722) of the Cenél nEógain and that same year in 721 Fergal invaded Leinster and enforced the payment of the cattle tribute.

The Leinstermen broke the truce however, and Fergal retaliated by invading again. However in December of 722 Fergal and numerous nobles of the Ui Neill were slain at the Battle of Allen (County Kildare) by the Leinstermen led by Murchad. The saga Cath Almaine preserves the story of this battle and mentions that Murchad's son Dúnchad mac Murchado (died 728) and Áed mac Colggen (died 738) of the Uí Cheinnselaig fought for Leinster. The breaking of the truce angered Cathal and they sent the head of Fergal to him. The Annals of Tigernach claim that the high king Cináed mac Írgalaig (died 728) of the Síl nÁedo Sláine defeated the Laigin at the Battle of Maíne in 726 and obtained his demands but this is not confirmed by other annals.

The rise of the Ui Dunlainge was assisted by the decline of the Uí Máil. Two of the sons of Cellach Cualann (died 715), the previous king were slain during his reign. Áed mac Cellaig (died 719) was slain at the Battle of Finnabair (Fennor, Co.Kildare) in a fight among the Laigin and Crimthann mac Cellaig (died 726) was slain at the Battle of Belach Lice at an immature age.

One of Murchad's wives was Conchenn ingen Cellaig (died 743) of the Uí Máil, she was the mother of Fáelán mac Murchado (died 738) and Muiredach mac Murchado (died 760), who were kings of Leinster. Other sons included Dúnchad mac Murchado (died 728) and Bran Becc mac Murchado (died 738), also kings of Leinster.

== See also ==
- Kings of Leinster
