= Uí Dúnchada =

Uí Dúnchada was an Irish lineage and kingdom.

== Lineage ==
The divisions of the Uí Dúnlainge kingdom derived from three sons of Murchad mac Brain Mut of Uí Dúnlainge, king of Laigin (d. 727). "The third brother, Dúnchad mac Murchada (d. 728), was ancestor to Uí Dúnchada" (2008, p. 162). The Uí Dúnchada lineage took the surname Mac Gilla Mo Cholmóc by 1100.

== Kingdom ==
The Uí Dúnlainge were a "powerful lineage ... which had risen to dominance in Laigin Tuadgabair, divided into three segments during the early eighth century, each of which in turn formed distinct kingdoms." (2008, p. 163). Uí Dúnchada became a "regional kingdom", its territory "later represented by two cantreds, Newcastle Lyons and Fercoulen", the former representing the trícha of Uí Dúnchada proper. MacCotter states:

The cantred of Newcastle Lyons appears to derive from the Uí Dúnchada of 'proper', as distinct from the regional kingdom of the same name. Uí Dúnchada may have moved into this area as early as the late eighth century, and were certain here by the early tenth century, when one of their kings is styled Lorcán Liamna (from Liamhain or Newcastle Lyons, their later seat). The Uí Dúnchada tract mentions two territorial units in the kingtdom in addition to Fír Chualann: Uí Dúnchada 'proper' and Uí Gabla, both of which seem to have lain in Uí Dúnchada (which) itself certain contained all of south Dublin west of the Dodder.

Henry II retained both cantreds for himself in 1171-72. Grants of 1173, 1185, 1207, 1213 and 1377, make clear that it included the parishes of Ballybought, Ballymore and Tipperkevin in County Kildare; Kilbride, Blessington, Burgage, Boystown, Hollywood, Crehelp, Tober, Dunlavin, Rathsallagh and part of Donard, all in County Wicklow.

Rathdown Castle (anciently Rath Oinn) was a historical centre of Uí Dunchada power.
