= Bran mac Fáeláin =

Bran mac Fáeláin (died 838) was a King of Leinster of the Uí Dúnchada sept of the Uí Dúnlainge branch of the Laigin. This sept had their royal seat at Líamhain (Lyons Hill, on the Dublin-Kildare border). He was the nephew of Fínsnechta Cethardec mac Cellaig (died 808) and grandson of Cellach mac Dúnchada (died 776), previous kings. His father Fáelán (died 804) had been abbot of Kildare. Bran ruled from 835 to 838.

The annals record that in 835, the high king Niall Caille of the Cenél nEógain led an army into Leinster and set up Bran as king. The previous king Cellach mac Brain (died 834) of the Uí Muiredaig sept had been aligned with Feidlimid mac Cremthanin (died 847), the powerful king of Munster. The annals mention a co-ruler, his cousin Riacán mac Fínsnechtai who died in 837.

Viking raids occurred during his reign. In 837 a Viking force of sixty ships operated on the Liffey river and plundered the surrounding plain.

Bran's sons Muiredach mac Brain (died 885) and Ruarc mac Brain (died 862) were also Kings of Leinster.
