= Ailill mac Dúnlainge =

King of Leinster

Ailill mac Dúnlainge c. (831 – 871) was a King of Leinster of the Uí Muiredaig sept of the Uí Dúnlainge branch of the Laigin. This sept had their royal seat at Maistiu (Mullaghmast) in South Kildare in what is now Ireland. He was the son of Dúnlaing mac Muiredaig (died 869), a previous king. He ruled from 869-871.

There is much confusion in the king lists during this period for Leinster. Ailill is the first person awarded the title King of Leinster in the Annals of Ulster at his death notice since 838. Francis John Byrne suggests that the root of this apparent confusion lay in the fact that the Uí Dúnlainge kings exercised little real authority due to the aggressions of their western neighbour Cerball mac Dúnlainge (died 888), King of Osraige. Cerball, while unable to install himself as king of Leinster, was able to prevent any rival king exercising real power there.

In 870 the high king Áed Findliath (died 879) invaded Leinster and overran it from Áth Cliath (Dublin) to Gabrán. Meanwhile, his ally Cerball mac Dúnlainge (died 888) of Osraige invaded Leinster from the west. He reached Dún Bolg where his camp was attacked by the Laigin who were at first successful, but in a counter-attack they were put to flight. Ailill's name is not connected with these events which state that Muiredach mac Brain was the King of Leinster who fought the forces of Cerball. The Fragmentary Annals give a lengthy account of this event and state that Cerball met up with the high king's forces at Belach Gabrán (the pass of Gowran in east-central Osraighe) but both forces then retired and the hostages of the Laigin were not taken.

In 871 Ailill was killed by the Vikings of Dublin. His son, Augaire mac Aililla (died 917) was also a King of Leinster.
