= Fráech mac Finchada =

Fráech mac Finchada or Fróech mac Findchado (died 495) was a king of Leinster. Fráech was a member of the Dál Messin Corb dynasty's principal sub-sept, the Uí Garrchon. He succeeded his father, Fincath mac Garrchu, (died 485). He ruled from 485 to 495.

The annals record a defeat of the Leinstermen at the Battle of Taillten in 494 by Coirpre mac Néill. This is associated with the Ui Neill conquest of Brega and the taking of Tailtiu. In 495 Fráech was defeated and slain by Eochu mac Coirpri at the second Battle of Grainaret (Granard, County Longford) in Tethba.

== See also ==
Kings of Leinster
