= John Feary =

English painter

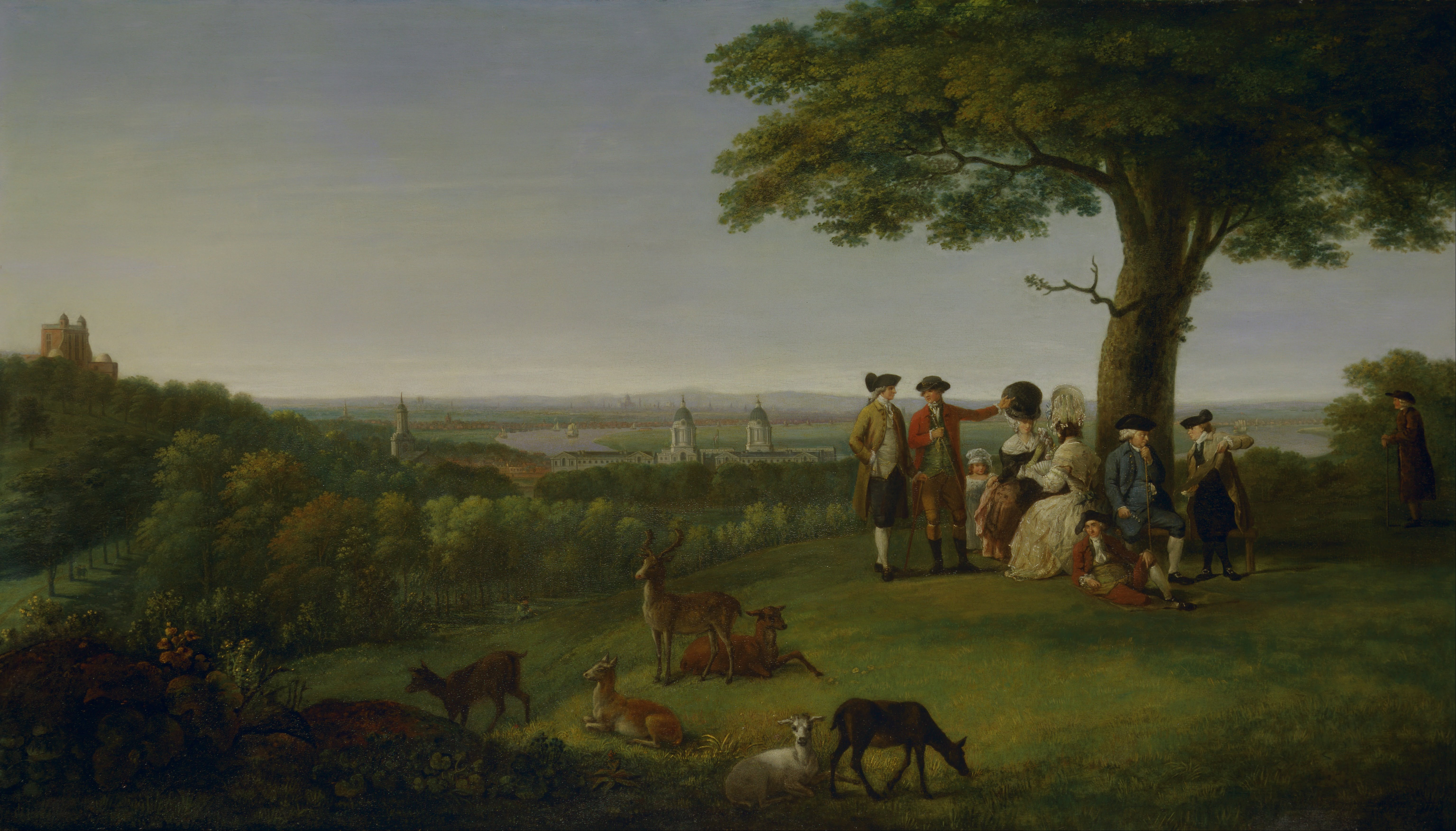
John Feary, One Tree Hill, Greenwich, with London in the Distance (1779)

John Feary (c.1745–1788) was a British landscape painter.

== Life ==
Feary obtained a premium from the Society of Arts in 1766, for artists under age 21. It was for a drawing from the Duke of Richmond's gallery. In 1776 he was awarded a large silver pallet for a landscape. He was reportedly a pupil of Richard Wilson. His landscapes were neatly finished, and he was employed to paint views of the parks and mansions of the nobility and gentry, some of which have been engraved. In 1784 he made a tour of Derbyshire.

== Works ==
Feary first appeared as an exhibitor with the Free Society of Artists in 1770, sending A View from Maise Hill in Greenwich Park (i.e Maze Hill), and A View of a Storm breaking from the Surrey side of Westminster Bridge; in 1771 he sent there A View taken from Highgate Hill. In 1772 he exhibited at the Royal Academy, with A View of Clapham Common, taken from the North Side, and he was a frequent contributor up to 1788. In the year of his death, he exhibited there A View of Castle Hill, Devonshire.
