= Vilbaldr Dufþaksson =

Norse-Irish settler of Iceland

Vilbaldr Dufþaksson (fl. 980s; Old Norse: [ˈwilˌbɑldz̠ ˈduvˌθɑksˌson]; Modern Icelandic: Vilbaldur Dufþaksson [ˈvɪlˌpaltʏr ˈtʏvˌθaksˌsɔːn]) was a Norse-Gael settler in Iceland, mentioned in the Landnámabók. He was the great-grandson of Cerball mac Dúnlainge, king of Osraige from 842 to 888, via an otherwise unknown son of Cerball, called Dufnial (Domnall). His brother was one Askell hnokkan, and his sons were Bjouok and Bjolan.

== Family tree ==
  Dungal, d 842.
  |__________________________________
  |                 |                |
  Cerball, d 888.   Riacan, d 894.   Land, d 890. + Mael Sechnaill  + Aed Finlaith  + Gaethine
  |___________________________________________________________________________________________________________________________
  |                  |         |                  |                   |         |                    |                        |
  Diarmait, d 928.   Cuilde    Ceallach, d 908.   Rafarta + Eyvindr   Domnall   Kormled + Grimolfr   Frithgertr + Iorirhima   Ethna + Hlodvir
  |                            |_________________                     |                 |                                           |
  |                            |                 |                    |                 |                                           |
  ?                            Donnchad, d 976.  Cuilen, d 933.       Dufpakr           Porgrimr                                    Sigurd digri, Earl of Orkney, d 1014.
  |                            |                                      |_________
  |                            |                                      |         |
  Ceallach, d 1003.            Gilla Patraic, d 996.                  Vilbadr   Askell hnokhan
                               |                                      |_________
                               |                                      |         |
                               Mac Giolla Padhraic                    Bjollok   Bjolan
                               |
                               |
                               Kings of Osraighe

== See also ==
- Cerball mac Dúnlainge
- Landnámabók
