= Gearalt MacMurrough-Kavanagh =

Gerald Kavanagh (Irish: Gerald Mac Murchadha Caomhánach), known as Gerald of Ferns, was King of Leinster from 1518 to 1522, when his son Morogh succeeded him. His father was Art Óg mac Murchadha Caomhánach, who was a king of Ireland and King of Leinster.
