= Tethbae =

Middle Ages Irish confederation

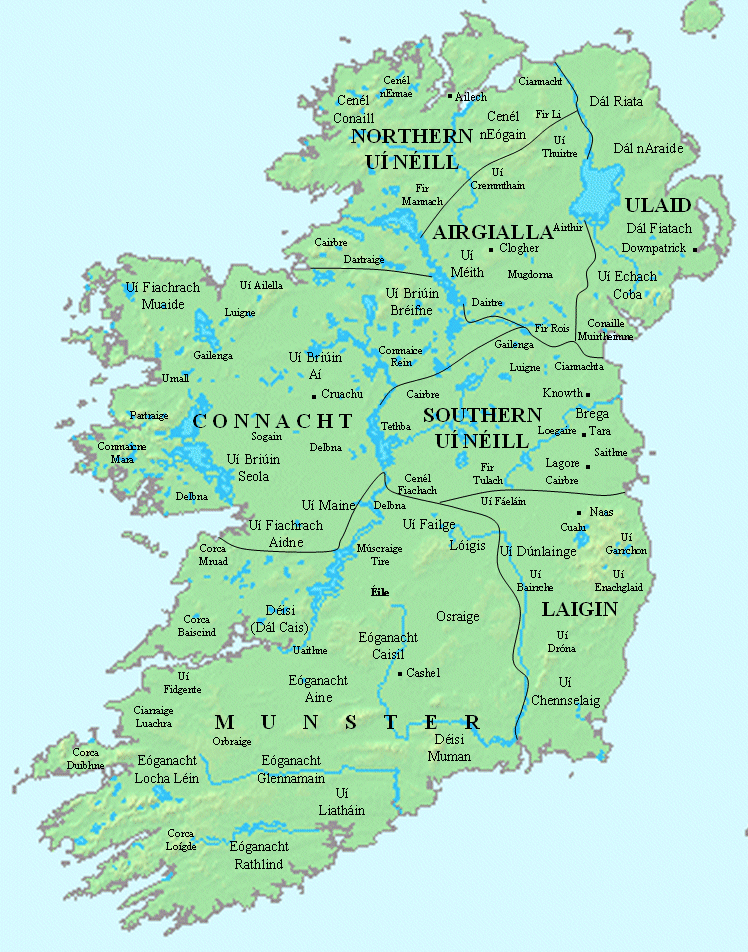
Early peoples and kingdoms of Ireland. Here Tethba is used to label south Tethbae while north Tethbae is labelled Cairbre, one of three kingdoms named for Coirpre, or Cairbre, son of Niall of the Nine Hostages

Tethbae (Old Irish pronunciation: [ˈt̠ʲeθβe]; also spelled Tethba, often anglicised Teffia) (Note: According to Dobbs, "the name 'Tethba' occurs most frequently in the genitive and dative cases, and the spelling varies, as the following instances show: Fremainn Tethbai, h-i Tethbai, Granairud Tethba, Luachair Tethbai, Iarthar Tebhtho, La Tethba, Fir Tebtha, Fir tebhtha, i Tebtha, i Teathfa, a Teafa. The form 'Tethba' seems best to use in this paper". See also) was a confederation of túatha in central Ireland in the Middle Ages. It was divided into two distinct kingdoms, north Tethba, ruled by the Cenél Coirpri, and south Tethba, ruled by the Cenél Maini. It covered parts of County Westmeath and much of County Longford, counties which today are the far north-west part of the province of Leinster. In some cases, Tethbae may refer to South Tethbae only.

== Two Tethbae ==
In Early Christian times, Tethba lay within the lands of the southern Uí Néill and the ruling dynasties of both kingdoms were reckoned members of the Uí Néill kindred in medieval genealogies. North Tethba—Tethbae Thúaiscirt—was centred on Granard, while south Tethba—Tethbae Deiscirt—lay around Ardagh.

The division of Tethbae into northern and southern regions was attested in the 7th century. It was not only a political and dynastic division. The chief churches of the two-halves belonged to different church confederations. North Tethbae's principal church at Granard was associated with Saint Patrick from the earliest written records. Bishop Tirechán's hagiography refers to "the two Tethbae" and claims that Patrick established bishops at both Granard and Ardagh. But although Granard is included among the network of Patrician churches, Ardagh is not. The key figure in Ardagh tradition was its founder, Bishop Mél, according to Patrician accounts a nephew of Patrick. Ardagh, by the time of Tirechán and the earliest records, was a part of the confederation of churches which took Brigit of Kildare as chief patron and looked mainly to the church at Kildare for leadership.

== Cenél Coirpri ==
Medieval Irish traditions presented the lands of the Uí Néill as conquests by Niall of the Nine Hostages and his sons. Niall's son Coirpre was the eponymous ancestor of Cenél Coirpri. Along with Fiachu, he may have led the earliest Uí Néill conquests in the midlands.

North Tethbae, Cenél Coirpri Mór, was one of three kingdoms named for Coirpre mac Néill. To the north-west of Tethbae, on the shore of Donegal Bay, was the kingdom of Cenél Coirpi Dromma Clíab. To the south-east, in County Kildare, around Carbury, itself named for Coirpre, was a third branch of Cenél Coirpi but this was not established until much later. This alignment of territories, together with the evidence of the Irish annals, which include a series of entries crediting Coirpre with the conquest of the midlands, suggests that the kingdom of Coirpre once extended over 100 miles across Ireland.

Apart from Coirpre himself and his grandson Túathal Máelgarb, no king of Cenél Coirpri is included in later lists of High Kings of Ireland. Later kings of Cenél Coirpri are mentioned in the Annals of Ulster and other Irish annals with some frequency, although usually only to report their deaths. Most kings are simply called "king of Cenél Coirpri", although Conaing (died 752) is specifically called "king of Coirpri of Tethbae". An entry in 799 reporting the deaths of two kings of Coirpri, Murchad ua Cathail and Dub Innrecht mac Artgaile, shows that the kingship could be shared. In addition to the usual annalistic reports, Óengus Bronbachall, grandson of Túathal, is mentioned in Adomnán's Life of Saint Columba.

At least in earlier historical times, Cenél Coirpri may have been of sufficient importance to attract the attention of largely hostile writers. Tirechán's life of Patrick states that Coirpre was cursed by the saint, at the hill of Tara, that none of his descendants would be High King. Túathal Máelgarb is portrayed in a poor light by later writers dealing with the life of Diarmait mac Cerbaill, his perhaps-kinsman whose descendants, Clann Cholmáin and the Síl nÁedo Sláine, replaced the kindreds of Coirpre and Fiachu as rulers of the midlands.

In the 11th century, north Tethbae was largely absorbed by the expanding kingdom of Bréifne, ruled by the Ua Ruairc branch of the Connachta kindred of Uí Briúin, and its clients the Conmaicne Réin.

== Cenél Maini ==
While Coirpe mac Néill is a major figure in the annals and appears in Tirechán's hagiography, Maine son of Niall is not mentioned by Tirechán, nor is there any record of his conquests. It may be possible, and is perhaps even probable, that descent from Niall of the Nine Hostages through an otherwise poorly attested line of descent is a genealogical fiction designed to strengthen Uí Néill control of the midlands. The Cenél Maini probably originated as part of a much larger Uí Maine kingdom extending from the eastern part of modern County Galway through County Roscommon, across the River Shannon, and into County Longford.

Although officially incorporated into the Uí Néill, no king of Cenél Maini was ever reckoned a High King of Ireland. The Vita tripartita Sancti Patricii does, however, say that the kings of Cenél Maini had a privileged place in choosing and inaugurating High Kings, much like the Airgíalla, another group believed to have been associated with the Connachta, of which the Uí Néill were only the leading group, by genealogical fictions.

The Cenél Maini are still represented today among the Irish nobility and Chiefs of the Name by the Fox Family who were historically known as Ó Catharnaigh Sionnach (O'Kearney Fox) before it was Anglicised during the Tudor Conquest in the 16th century. (another example of this Irish agnomen see Mac Murchadha Caomhánach). The descendants of the Ó Catharnaigh Sionnach are still commonly found in the Irish Midlands to this day but usually in the form as Fox and rarely O'Kearney/Kearney.
