= Mac Cairthinn mac Coelboth =

Mac Cairthinn mac Coelboth (?-446?-530?) was an Uí Enechglaiss King of Leinster.

== Background ==
Mac Cairthinn is one of the very earliest verifiable Irish kings. Though not listed in any extant Irish genealogies, the Annals of Innisfallen record his death at the battle of Mag Femen in the kingdom of Brega in 446. Almost uniquely, this otherwise unverifiable reference is corroborated by an Ogham inscription on a stone near Slane in the neighbouring County Louth. It reads MAQI CAIRATINI AVI INEQAGLAS, which translates as [the stone] of Mac Cairthinn grandson [or perhaps descendant] of Enechglass. This would make him a contemporary of Niall Noigíallach.

The Irish annals, recording the battle of Mag Femen, say of Mac Cairthinn, "[s]ome say he was of the Cruithni". This appears to be based on the false assumption that his father was the eponymous ancestor of the Dál nAraidi sept of Uí Chóelbad. Other unreliable and late sources may have linked Mac Cairthinn with the Uí Néill, by making his father Cóelbad a son of Niall.

== Early historic Leinster ==
According to Dáibhí Ó Cróinín the above demonstrates "how far north Leinster's territorial claims once extended" and that warfare between the Laigin and the emerging Uí Néill occurred in the north of Brega and on the plains of what is now County Meath and County Westmeath. All these territories would be lost to the Uí Néill in the following century.

== Date of Cath Mag Femen ==
The date of the battle of Mag Femen is given as 446 in the Annals of Ulster and 447 in the Annals of Inisfallen.

However, Devane (p. 189, 2005) proposes that the date has been misplaced, as a result of "the original source of the entries being wrongly entered by one, if not indeed two, cycles in the Irish 84-year cycle, by the which the Irish and British churches until the sixth century reckoned the date of Easter. A discrepancy of one calendar cycle would push the date of the battle of Femen forward to the year 530, which ... would lend weight to the argument that it was the son or sons of Coirpre, and not Coirpre himself who defeated the Ui Enechglaiss at the battle of Femen."
