= Maine of Tethba =

Máiné of Tethbae or Máiné mac Néill was a supposed son of Niall Noigiallach. Writing of him in 1973, Irish historian Francis John Byrne stated his belief that:

We may suspect then that eastern Uí Máiné was so successfully absorbed into the Uí Néill ambit that their kings, by a polite fiction, were accepted into the dominant dynasty circle ... The fact that the annalistic obit of Máiné mac Néill in 440 is so much earlier than that of any of his supposed brothers also suggests that he was adopted into the dynasty some time after the synthetic historians had agreed to push back the date of Niall's reign by a generation or more. [Byrne 1973:92–93]

It is actually far more likely that Máine Mór was the ancestor of the Uí Maine, whose kingdom once covered a region over the entire of what is now County Galway north and east of Athenry, all of south County Roscommon, and stretching over the River Shannon into the regions called Cenél Máiné, Cuircni, Calraige and Delbhna Bethra. Cenél Máiné lay in the south-west portion of the kingdom of Tethbae – on the east shore of Lough Ree – and when it was taken over by the Uí Néill, its ruler's ancestor was given a pedigree making him a son of Niall.

Ui Máiné remained a powerful independent kingdom in its own right for several further centuries.

== See also ==
- Clan O Duibhgeannain
- Máine Mór
