= Énnae Cennsalach =

Énnae Cennsalach (5th century) was a King of Leinster and founder of the Uí Cheinnselaig sept of the Laigin. He was the grandson of Bressal Bélach (died 436), a previous king.

The chronology of Leinster kings in the 5th century is contradictory. He is counted as a King of Laigin in the Book of Leinster but is not mentioned in the annals.

Keating records wars of the High King Eochaid Mugmedón with Énnae Cennselach. Eochaid was defeated at the Battle of Cruachan Claonta by the Leinsterman.

According to the sagas Aided Néill and Orcuin Néill Noígíallaig, Énnae's son Eochu was the killer of the high king Niall Noígíallach. Orcuin Néill Noígíallaig relates that Eochu killed Niall's chief poet. This led Niall to harry Leinster and exile Eochu. Eochu took refuge with King Erc of Dalriada and later killed Niall on his return from a raid. Aided Néill relates that Niall's son Fergus avenged his father by killing Eochu.

Énnae's son Crimthann mac Énnai (d. 486) also became King of Leinster. Another son Fedelmid was ancestor of the Uí Felmeda branch of the Uí Cheinnselaig.
