= Dál Messin Corb =

The Dál Messin Corb were a ruling dynasty of Leinster along with the Dál Chormaic. Descended from Chú Chorb's son Messin Corb, they were the last of the Dumnonians. In the fifth and sixth centuries they were ousted and driven from their seat on the Liffey and into Wicklow.

The main branch of the dynasty were the Uí Garrchon. The sixth-century saint, Kevin of Glendalough, was said to have been descended from the Uí Náir, a minor branch.

== See also ==
- Laigin
- Fortuatha
