= List of kings of Leinster =

Kings of Leinster
- Ríthe na Laighean
- Map of Leinster, c. 10th century.

Details
- Style: Rí Laighin
- First monarch: Úgaine Mór
- Last monarch: Domhnall Spáinneach Mac Murchadha Caomhánach
- Formed: Ancient
- Abolished: 1603 or 1632 (de facto)
- Residence: Dún Ailinne
- Appointer: Tanistry

The kings of Leinster (Irish: Ríthe na Laighean) ruled from the establishment of Leinster during the Irish Iron Age until the 17th century Early Modern Ireland. According to Gaelic traditional history found in works such as the Book of Invasions, Leinster was created during the division of Ireland among the Irish Gaels, descendants of Milesius: Leinster was one of the territories held by the offspring of Heremon. In the 7th century BC, the branch of the Heremonians who would establish Leinster, starting with Úgaine Mór, were also High Kings of Ireland and Kings of Tara. Their ascent to hegemony in Ireland was associated with the decline in influence of their Ulster-based Heremonian kinsmen from the Érainn.

Apart from Úgaine Mór, other prominent Kings of Leinster from this period who were also High Kings of Ireland were Labraid Loingsech and Cathair Mór. A mythology developed that Labraid Loingsech had horses ears: he spent some time exiled in Transalpine Gaul (dated roughly to the period of the Roman–Gallic wars) where his grandmother was from and returned to Ireland with Gaulish mercenaries. He established a base in the area, which was renamed from "Gailian" to Leinster, in reference to the pointed-spears held by the Gaulish Gaesatae mercenaries who provided the backbone of Labraid Loingsech's powerbase and brought him to the High Kingship. Cathair Mór, who was also a High King of Ireland, is perhaps the most important figure genealogically in Leinster as all of the subsequent kinship groups which ruled Gaelic Leinster claimed descent and legitimacy to rule from one of his ten sons who had offspring.

By the time of Early Christian Ireland, the Laighín had lost their grip on Irish hegemony with the rise of the descendants of Conn of the Hundred Battles (the Connachta and the Uí Néill). The latter pushed down into Leinster and created the Kingdom of Meath based at Uisnech, under the Southern Uí Néill from territories belonging to the Kingdom of Leinster and to the west Osraige was taken from the Laighín by the Corcu Loígde of Munster.

During the 5th to the early 8th centuries, the Kingship of Leinster was contested by various different branches of the Laighín, including the Uí Cheinnselaig (ancestors of the Mac Murchada and Caomhánach), the Uí Dúnlainge (ancestors of the O'Byrnes and the O'Tooles), the Uí Bairrche (ancestors of the Mac Gormáin), the Uí Máil (ancestors of the Ó Conchobhair Uí Failghe) and others.

From the 8th until the 11th century, the kingship of Leinster rotated in a remarkably stable arrangement between three branches of the North Leinster Uí Dúnlainge kinship, namely the Uí Fáeláin (ancestors of the O'Byrnes), the Uí Muiredaig (ancestors of the O'Tooles) and the Uí Dúnchada (whose descendants became the MacGillaMoCholmóc and later the FitzDermots). In the 9th century, the Laighín also regained control of Osraige but it remained a largely independent realm under the Mac Giolla Phádrag, from the semi-autonomous Uí Failghe kinship group.

The Uí Cheinnselaig in South Leinster took back control of the kingship of Leinster in the 11th century, with Diarmait mac Máel na mBó, who became the first Leinsterman to be High King of Ireland in over a thousand years and claimed to the most senior line of the Laighín. An enemy of the Vikings of Dublin, he gave refuge to the sons of Harold Godwinson after the Normans conquered England. It is from this line that the Mac Murchada family originate and later Diarmait Mac Murchada would be implicated in the 12th century Norman invasion of Ireland after he tried to win back his Leinster throne. The reigning dynasty adopted the surname Caomhánach (Kavanagh) and continued to rule a rump Kingdom of Leinster until the early 17th century, with the last recorded King of Leinster being Domhnall Spáinneach Mac Murchadha Caomhánach. Throughout the centuries after the Norman invasion, several Kings and also leaders from dynasties who had previously held the Kingship of Leinster, continued to resist the invasion and hounded the English Pale periodically from the Wicklow Mountains: including the leaders of the O'Toole and O'Byrne clans (notable examples include Art Óg Mac Murchadha Caomhánach and Fiach McHugh O'Byrne) until the 17th century.

== Legendary Kings ==
- Mesgegra

== Kings of Leinster ==
=== Laigin, classical antiquity ===
Name	Portrait	Birth	Marriage(s)	Death
Úgaine Mór; 634–594 BC		Son of Eochu Buadach	unknown	594 BCE
Lóegaire Lorc; 594–592 BC		Son of Úgaine Mór	unknown	592 BCE
Ailill Áine; 592–592 BC		Son of Lóegaire Lorc	unknown	592 BCE
Cobthach Cóel Breg; 592–542 BC		Son of Úgaine Mór	unknown	542 BCE
Labraid Loingsech; 542–523 BC		Son of Ailill Áine mac Lóegaire Lorc	unknown	523 BCE
Cathair Mór; 119–122 AD		Son of Fedlimid Fir Urglais mac Cormaic Gealtach	11 children	122 AD

=== Uí Cheinnselaig, 5th century ===
Name	Portrait	Birth	Marriage(s)	Death
Fiacha Baicheda mac Cathair Mór –		Son of Cathair Mór	unknown	416
Bressal Bélach mac Fiacha Baicheda –436		Son of Fiacha Baicheda mac Cathair Mór	unknown	436
Énnae Cennsalach mac Labhradh –		Son of Labhradh mac Bressal Bélach	unknown	unknown

=== Uí Bairrche, 5th century ===
Name	Portrait	Birth	Marriage(s)	Death
Muiredach Mo Sníthech mac Dáire Barrach – (claimant)		Son of Dáire Barrach mac Cathair Mór	unknown	unknown
Móenach mac Muiredach Mo Sníthech – (claimant)		Son of Muiredach Mo Sníthech mac Dáire Barrach	unknown	unknown

=== Uí Enechglaiss, –446 ===
Name	Portrait	Birth	Marriage(s)	Death
Mac Cairthinn mac Coelboth –446	unknown	Son of Cóelbad	unknown	446

=== Uí Cheinnselaig, 446–483 ===
Name	Portrait	Birth	Marriage(s)	Death
Crimthann mac Énnai; 446–483		Son of Énnae Cennsalach	unknown	483

=== Uí Garrchon, 483–495 ===
Name	Portrait	Birth	Marriage(s)	Death
Fincath mac Garrchu; 483–485	unknown	Son of Garrchú mac Fothaid	unknown	485
Fráech mac Finchada; 485–495	unknown	Son of Fincath mac Garrchu	unknown	495

=== Uí Dúnlainge, 495–592 ===
Name	Portrait	Birth	Marriage(s)	Death
Ailill mac Dúnlainge; 495–527		Son of Dúnlaing mac Énda Niada	Etromma Ui Tellain	527
Cormac mac Ailillo; 527–535		Son of Ailill mac Dúnlainge	unknown	535
Coirpre mac Cormaic; 535–546		Son of Cormac mac Ailillo	unknown	546
Colmán Már mac Coirpre; 546–576		Son of Coirpre mac Cormaic	unknown	576
Áed Dub mac Colmáin; 576–592		Son of Colmán Már mac Coirpre	unknown	639

=== Uí Máil, 592–595 ===
Name	Portrait	Birth	Marriage(s)	Death
Áed Dibchine; 592–595		Son of Seanach Diodhach mac Carthann Muadh	unknown	595

=== Uí Cheinnselaig, 595–624 ===
Name	Portrait	Birth	Marriage(s)	Death
Brandub mac Echach; 595–605		Son of Echu mac Muiredaig	unknown	605
Rónán mac Colmáin; 605–624		Son of Colmán mac Cormaic	unknown	624

=== Uí Máil, 624–633 ===
Name	Portrait	Birth	Marriage(s)	Death
Crimthann mac Áedo; 624–633		Son of Áed Dibchine	unknown	633

=== Uí Dúnlainge, 633–666 ===
Name	Portrait	Birth	Marriage(s)	Death
Fáelán mac Colmáin; 633–656; 656–666		Son of Colmán Már mac Coirpri	unknown	666

=== Uí Cheinnselaig, 656 ===
Name	Portrait	Birth	Marriage(s)	Death
Crundmáel Erbuilc; 656		Son of Rónán mac Colmáin	unknown	656

=== Uí Máil, 666–680 ===
Name	Portrait	Birth	Marriage(s)	Death
Fiannamail mac Máele Tuile; 666–680		Son of Máele Tuile mac Rónán Crach	unknown	680

=== Uí Dúnlainge, 680–693 ===
Name	Portrait	Birth	Marriage(s)	Death
Bran Mut mac Conaill; 680–693		Son of Conall mac Fáelán	unknown	693

=== Uí Máil, 693–715 ===
Name	Portrait	Birth	Marriage(s)	Death
Cellach Cualann; 693–715		Son of Gertighe mac Diocolla Dana	unknown	715

=== Uí Dúnlainge, 715–728 ===
Name	Portrait	Birth	Marriage(s)	Death
Murchad mac Brain Mut; 715–727		Son of Bran Mut mac Conaill	unknown	727
Dúnchad mac Murchada; 727–728		Son of Murchad mac Brain Mut	unknown	728

=== Uí Fáeláin (Uí Dúnlainge), 728–738 ===
Name	Portrait	Birth	Marriage(s)	Death
Fáelán mac Murchada; 728–738		Son of Murchad mac Brain Mut	unknown	738

=== Uí Dúnlainge, 738 ===
Name	Portrait	Birth	Marriage(s)	Death
Bran Becc mac Murchada; 738		Son of Murchad mac Brain Mut	unknown	738

=== Uí Cheinnselaig, 738 ===
Name	Portrait	Birth	Marriage(s)	Death
Áed mac Colggen; 738		Son of Colcú mac Bressail	unknown	738

=== Uí Muiredaig (Uí Dúnlainge), 738–760 ===
Name	Portrait	Birth	Marriage(s)	Death
Muiredach mac Murchada; 738–760		Son of Murchad mac Brain Mut	unknown	760

=== Uí Dúnchada (Uí Dúnlainge), 760–776 ===
Name	Portrait	Birth	Marriage(s)	Death
Cellach mac Dúnchada; 760–776	unknown	Son of Dúnchad mac Murchada	unknown	776

=== Uí Fáeláin (Uí Dúnlainge), 776–785 ===
Name	Portrait	Birth	Marriage(s)	Death
Ruaidrí mac Fáeláin; 776–785		Son of Fáelán mac Murchada	unknown	785

=== Uí Muiredaig (Uí Dúnlainge), 785–795 ===
Name	Portrait	Birth	Marriage(s)	Death
Bran Ardchenn; 785–795		Son of Muiredach mac Murchada	unknown	795

=== Uí Dúnchada (Uí Dúnlainge), 795–808 ===
Name	Portrait	Birth	Marriage(s)	Death
Fínsnechta Cethardec; 795–808	unknown	Son of Cellach mac Dúnchada	unknown	808

=== Uí Muiredaig (Uí Dúnlainge), 808–818 ===
Name	Portrait	Birth	Marriage(s)	Death
Muiredach mac Brain; 808–818		Son of Bran Ardchenn	unknown	818

=== Uí Fáeláin (Uí Dúnlainge), 818–829 ===
Name	Portrait	Birth	Marriage(s)	Death
Muiredach mac Ruadrach; 818–829		Son of Ruaidrí mac Fáeláin	unknown	829

=== Uí Muiredaig (Uí Dúnlainge), 829–834 ===
Name	Portrait	Birth	Marriage(s)	Death
Cellach mac Brain; 829–834		Son of Bran Ardchenn	unknown	834

=== Uí Dúnchada (Uí Dúnlainge), 834–838 ===
Name	Portrait	Birth	Marriage(s)	Death
Bran mac Fáeláin; 834–838	unknown	Son of Fáelán mac Cellaig	unknown	838

=== Uí Muiredaig (Uí Dúnlainge), 838–854 ===
Name	Portrait	Birth	Marriage(s)	Death
Lorcán mac Cellaig; 838–851		Son of Cellach mac Brain	unknown	unknown
Túathal mac Máele-Brigte; 851–854		Son of Muiredach mac Brain	unknown	854

=== Uí Dúnchada (Uí Dúnlainge), 854–862 ===
Name	Portrait	Birth	Marriage(s)	Death
Ruarc mac Brain; 854–862	unknown	Son of Bran mac Fáeláin	unknown	862

=== Uí Fáeláin (Uí Dúnlainge), 862–863 ===
Name	Portrait	Birth	Marriage(s)	Death
Muirecán mac Diarmata; 862–863		Son of Diarmata mac Ruadrach	unknown	863

=== Uí Muiredaig (Uí Dúnlainge), 863–871 ===
Name	Portrait	Birth	Marriage(s)	Death
Dúnlaing mac Muiredaig; 863–869		Son of Muiredach mac Brain	unknown	869
Ailill mac Dúnlainge; 869–871		Son of Dúnlaing mac Muiredaig	unknown	871

=== Uí Fáeláin (Uí Dúnlainge), 871–884 ===
Name	Portrait	Birth	Marriage(s)	Death
Domnall mac Muirecáin; 871–884		Son of Muirecán mac Diarmata	unknown	884

=== Uí Dúnchada (Uí Dúnlainge), 884–885 ===
Name	Portrait	Birth	Marriage(s)	Death
Muiredach mac Brain; 884–885	unknown	Son of Bran mac Fáeláin	unknown	885

=== Uí Fáeláin (Uí Dúnlainge), 885–909 ===
Name	Portrait	Birth	Marriage(s)	Death
Cerball mac Muirecáin; 885–909		Son of Muirecán mac Diarmata	unknown	909

=== Uí Muiredaig (Uí Dúnlainge), 909–917 ===
Name	Portrait	Birth	Marriage(s)	Death
Augaire mac Aililla; 909–917		Son of Ailill mac Dúnlainge	unknown	917

=== Uí Dúnchada (Uí Dúnlainge), 917–943 ===
Name	Portrait	Birth	Marriage(s)	Death
Faelan mac Muiredach; 917–942	unknown	Son of Muiredach mac Brain	unknown	942
Lorcán mac Fáelán; 942–943	unknown	Son of Faelan mac Muiredach	unknown	943

=== Uí Fáeláin (Uí Dúnlainge), 943–947 ===
Name	Portrait	Birth	Marriage(s)	Death
Bran Fionn mac Máel Mórda; 943–947		Son of Máel Mórda mac Muirecain	unknown	947

=== Uí Muiredaig (Uí Dúnlainge), 947–958 ===
Name	Portrait	Birth	Marriage(s)	Death
Túathal mac Úgaire; 947–958		Son of Augaire mac Aililla	unknown	958

=== Uí Dúnchada (Uí Dúnlainge), 958–966 ===
Name	Portrait	Birth	Marriage(s)	Death
Cellach mac Faelan; 958–966	unknown	Son of Faelan mac Muiredach	unknown	966

=== Uí Fáeláin (Uí Dúnlainge), 966–972 ===
Name	Portrait	Birth	Marriage(s)	Death
Murchad mac Brain Fionn; 966–972		Son of Bran Fionn mac Máel Mórda	unknown	972

=== Uí Muiredaig (Uí Dúnlainge), 972–978 ===
Name	Portrait	Birth	Marriage(s)	Death
Úgaire mac Túathail; 972–978		Son of Túathal mac Úgaire	unknown	978

=== Uí Dúnchada (Uí Dúnlainge), 978–1003 ===
Name	Portrait	Birth	Marriage(s)	Death
Domnall Claen; 978–984	unknown	Son of Lorcán mac Fáelán	unknown	984
Donnchad mac Domnall Claen; 984–1003	unknown	Son of Domnall Claen	unknown	unknown

=== Uí Fáeláin (Uí Dúnlainge), 1003–1014 ===
Name	Portrait	Birth	Marriage(s)	Death
Máel Mórda mac Murchada; 1003–1014		Son of Murchad mac Brain Fionn	unknown	1014

=== Uí Muiredaig (Uí Dúnlainge), 1014–1016 ===
Name	Portrait	Birth	Marriage(s)	Death
Dúnlaing mac Tuathal; 1014		Son of Túathal mac Úgaire	unknown	1014
Donncuan mac Dúnlainge; 1014–1016		Son of Dúnlaing mac Tuathal	unknown	1016

=== Uí Fáeláin (Uí Dúnlainge), 1016–1018 ===
Name	Portrait	Birth	Marriage(s)	Death
Bran mac Máel Mórda; 1016–1018		Son of Máel Mórda mac Murchada	unknown	1052

=== Uí Muiredaig (Uí Dúnlainge), 1018–1033 ===
Name	Portrait	Birth	Marriage(s)	Death
Augaire mac Dúnlainge; 1018–1024		Son of Dúnlaing mac Tuathal	unknown	1024
Donnchad mac Dúnlainge; 1024–1033		Son of Dúnlaing mac Tuathal	unknown	unknown

=== Mac Giolla Phádraig (Dál Birn), 1033–1039 ===
Name	Portrait	Birth	Marriage(s)	Death
Donnchad mac Gilla Pátraic; 1033–1039		Son of Gilla Pátraic mac Donnchada	unknown	1039

=== Uí Muiredaig (Uí Dúnlainge), 1039–1042 ===
Name	Portrait	Birth	Marriage(s)	Death
Murchad mac Dúnlainge; 1039–1042		Son of Dúnlaing mac Tuathal	unknown	1042

=== Mac Murchada (Uí Cheinnselaig), 1042–1115 ===
Name	Portrait	Birth	Marriage(s)	Death
Diarmait mac Máel na mBó; 1042–1072		Son of Donnchad Máel na mBó	Derbforgaill, daughter of Donnchad mac Briain	7 February 1072
Murchad mac Diarmata; 1052–1070		Son of Diarmait mac Máel na mBó	unknown	1070
Domnall mac Murchada; 1072–1075		Son of Murchad mac Diarmata	unknown	1075
Donnchad mac Domnaill Remair; 1075–1089		Son of Domnall Remar mac Máel na mBó	unknown	1089
Énna mac Diarmata; 1089–1092		Son of Diarmait mac Máel na mBó	unknown	1092
Diarmait mac Énna; 1092–1098		Son of Énna mac Diarmata	unknown	1098
Donnchadh mac Murchada; 1098–1115		Son of Murchad mac Diarmata	unknown	1115

=== Ó Conchobhair Uí Failghe, 1115 ===
Name	Portrait	Birth	Marriage(s)	Death
Conchobar mac Congalaig; 1115		Son of Congalach Ua Conchobair	unknown	1115

=== Mac Murchada (Uí Cheinnselaig), 1115–1171 ===
Name	Portrait	Birth	Marriage(s)	Death
Diarmait mac Énna meic Murchada; 1115–1117		Son of Énna Mac Murchada	unknown	1117
Énna mac Donnchada mic Murchada; 1117–1126		Son of Donnchadh mac Murchada	unknown	1126
Diarmait Mac Murchada; 1126–1166; 1169–1171		Son of Donnchad mac Murchada	unknown	1171

=== Caomhánach, 1171–1603 (Uí Cheinnselaig) ===
Name	Portrait	Birth	Marriage(s)	Death
Domhnall Caomhánach Mac Murchada; 1171–1175		Son of Diarmait Mac Murchada	unknown	1175
Domhnall Óg mac Domhnall Caomhánach –		Son of Domhnall Caomhánach Mac Murchada	unknown	unknown
Muirchertach mac Domhnall Óg Mac Murchada Caomhánach –1282		Son of Domhnall Óg mac Domhnall Caomhánach	unknown	1282
Muiris mac Muirchertach Mac Murchada Caomhánach; 1282–1314		Son of Muirchertach mac Domhnall Óg Mac Murchada Caomhánach	unknown	1314
Art Mac Murchada Caomhánach; 1314–1323		Son of Domhnall Óg mac Domhnall Caomhánach	unknown	1361
Domhnall mac Art Mac Murchada Caomhánach; 1323–1338		Son of Art mac Domhnall Óg Mac Murchada Caomhánach	unknown	1338
Domhnall mac Domhnall Mac Murchada Caomhánach; 1338–1347		Son of Domhnall mac Art Mac Murchada Caomhánach	unknown	1338
Muirchertach mac Muiris Mac Murchada Caomhánach; 1347–1354		Son of Muiris mac Muirchertach Mac Murchada Caomhánach	unknown	1354
Art Mór Mac Murchada Caomhánach; 1354–1362		Son of Muirchertach mac Muiris Mac Murchada Caomhánach	unknown	1362
Diarmait Mac Murchada Caomhánach; 1362–1369		Son of Domhnall mac Domhnall Mac Murchada Caomhánach	unknown	1369
Donnchadh mac Muirchertach Mac Murchada Caomhánach; 1369–1375		Son of Muirchertach mac Muiris Mac Murchada Caomhánach	unknown	1375
Art Mór Mac Murchadha Caomhánach; 1369–1375		Son of Muirchertach mac Muiris Mac Murchada Caomhánach	unknown	1375
Art Óg Mac Murchadha Caomhánach; 1375–1417		Son of Art Mór Mac Murchadha Caomhánach	unknown	1417
Donnchadh mac Art Mac Murchadha Caomhánach; 1417–1478		Son of Art Óg Mac Murchadha Caomhánach	unknown	1478
Domhnall Riabhach Mac Murchadha Caomhánach; 1478		Son of Gerald Mac Murchadha Caomhánach	unknown	1478
Muircheartach mac Donnchadh Mac Murchadha Caomhánach; 1478–1512		Son of Donnchadh mac Art Mac Murchadha Caomhánach	unknown	1512
Art Buidhe Mac Murchadha Caomhánach; 1512–1517		Son of Domhnall Riabhach Mac Murchadha Caomhánach	unknown	1517
Gerald Mac Murchadha Caomhánach; 1517–1523		Son of Domhnall Riabhach Mac Murchadha Caomhánach	unknown	1523
Muiris mac Domhnall Riabhach Mac Murchadha Caomhánach; 1523–1531		Son of Domhnall Riabhach Mac Murchadha Caomhánach	unknown	1531
Muircheartach mac Art Buidhe Mac Murchadha Caomhánach; 1531–1547		Son of Art Buidhe Mac Murchadha Caomhánach	unknown	1547
Muiris mac Domhnall Riabhach Mac Murchadha Caomhánach; 1523–1531		Son of Domhnall Riabhach Mac Murchadha Caomhánach	unknown	1531
Murchadh Mac Murchadha Caomhánach; 1531–1557		Son of Muiris mac Domhnall Riabhach Mac Murchadha Caomhánach	unknown	1531
Criomthann Mac Murchadha Caomhánach; 1557–1582		Son of Murchadh Mac Murchadha Caomhánach	unknown	1582
Domhnall Spáinneach Mac Murchadha Caomhánach; 1582–1603		Son of Donnchadh mac Cathaoir Mac Murchadha Caomhánach	unknown	1632

== See also ==
- Leinster
  - Laigin
  - Kingdom of Leinster
  - Province of Leinster
- King lists
  - High Kings
  - Osraige
  - Ulster
  - Connect
  - Monster
  - Mide
