= Uí Garrchon =

The Uí Garrchon were the principal sub-sept of the Dál Messin Corb, who were the ruling dynasty of Leinster, Ireland for much of the fifth century. Their main opponents outside of Leinster were the nascent Uí Néill. Their known kings include:

- Driccriu
- Cilline mac Rónain
- Marcán mac Cilline
- Fincath mac Garrchu, died 485
- Fráech mac Finchada, died 495

== See also ==
- Uí Enechglaiss
