= Laigin =

Population group of early Ireland

- Parent house: Heremonians
- Country: Ireland
- Founder: Labraid Loingsech
- Current head: MacMurrough Kavanagh
- Titles: Kings of Dún Ailinne; King of Leinster; King of Tara; High King of Ireland; Kings of Offaly; peerage titles
- Cadet branches: Various

The Laigin, modern spelling Laighin (Irish pronunciation: [ˈl̪ˠəinʲ]), were a Gaelic population group of early Ireland. They gave their name to the Kingdom of Leinster, which in the medieval era was known in Irish as Cóiced Laigen, meaning "Fifth/province of the Leinstermen" (Modern Irish Cúige Laighean), where their descendants ruled till the 17th century. Their territory, located in south-east Ireland, is thought to have once extended from the River Shannon to the River Boyne. The surnames of those descended from the Laigin are still counted amongst the most numerous in Ireland.

== Etymology ==
Laigin is a plural noun, indicating an ethnonym rather than a geographic term, but the Irish system of naming territories meant that an area tended to be named after an apical ancestor figure even when the ruling dynasty had no links to that figure. The origin of their name is uncertain; however, it is traditionally assumed to derive from the Irish word láigen, meaning 'a spear'. Early texts use the names Laigen and Gaileoin interchangeably.

== Origins ==
The Laigin claimed descent from King Labraid Loingsech. Modern historians suggest, on the basis of Irish traditions and related place names, that the Laigin were a group of invaders from Gaul or Britain, who arrived no later than the 6th century BC, and were later incorporated into the medieval genealogical scheme which made all the ruling groups of early Ireland descend from Míl Espáine. Placenames also suggest they once had a presence in north Munster and in Connacht.

One archaic poem, possibly dating from about 600 AD, reads as follows:

Móin óin, ó ba nóid, ní bu nós ardríg,
oirt ríga, rout án, aue Luirc Labraid.
Láithe gaile Galián gabsit inna lámaib laigne
Lagin de sin slóg Galián glonnach.
Glinnsit coicthe cota lir lerggae íath nÉremóin:
is iarna longis Lóchet Longsech fían flaith Góidel gabsus.
Gríb indrid íath n-anéoil aue Luirc Lóiguiri
arddu dóinaib acht nóibrí nime.
Ór ós gréin gelmair gabais for dóine domnaib
sceo déib Día óin as Móin macc Áini óinrig.

Móen alone since he was an infant (or "an adult")—a thing which is a custom for a High King—slew kings (with) a splendid shot, Labraid grandson of Lorc.
The warriors of the Galiáin took spears in their hands, from that the deedful host of the Galián are called Laigin.
They won wars as far as the sea of the shore of the lands of Éremón; it is after the taking ship, a lightning flash of warrior bands, that he seized the lordship of the Gaedel
Loégaire grandson of Lorc was a griffin overrunning unknown lands, exalted above men, except for the holy King of Heaven
Gold more shining than the sun he took, on the lands of men and gods, one god, that is Móen son of Áine, the one king.

In the saga, Orgain Denna Ríg (The Destruction of Dind Ríg), Labraid Loingsech is exiled when his granduncle Cobhtach Coel usurps the kingship, however, he subsequently returns from abroad with an army of spearmen (Laigin) and takes his kingship by burning the citadel of Dind Ríg to the ground with the usurper and all his retinue inside.

The saga ends with:

So then Cobthach Coel is there destroyed, with seven hundred followers and thirty kings around him, on the eve of great Christmas precisely. Hence is said: Three hundred years—victorious reckoning—before Christ's birth, a holy conception, it was not fraternal, it was evil—(Loegaire) Lorc was slain by Cobthach Coel. Cobthach Coel with thirty kings, Labraid ... slew him (Lugaid). Loegaire's grandson from the main, in Dind Ríg the host was slain. And 'tis of this that Ferchertne the poet said: "Dind Ríg, which had been Tuaim Tenbath," etc. i.e. Máin Ollam he was at first, Labraid Moen afterwards, but Labraid the Exile, since he went into exile, when he gained a realm as far as the Ictian Sea, and brought the many foreigners with him (to Ireland), to wit, two thousand and two hundred foreigners with broad lances in their hands, from which the Laigin (Leinstermen) are so called.

== Related peoples and dynasties ==
Archaic poems found in medieval genealogical texts distinguish three groups making up the Laigin: the Laigin proper, the Gaileóin, and the Fir Domnann. The latter are suggested to be related to the British Dumnonii.

Amongst others, some of the dynasties that claimed to belong to the Laigin include: Uí Failge, Uí Bairrche, Uí Dúnlainge, Uí Ceinnselaig, Uí Garrchon, and the Uí Máil.

== In medieval literature ==
In the legendary tales of the Ulster Cycle, the king of the Connachta, Ailill mac Máta, is said to belong to the Laigin. This is thought by Byrne (2001) to be related to a possible early domination of the province of Connacht by peoples related to the Laigin, the Fir Domnann and the Gamanrad.

== See also ==
- List of kings of Leinster
- Loígis
- Ó Laighin
- Uí Bairrche
- Uí Ceinnselaig
- Uí Dúnlainge

== General and cited references ==
- Byrne, Francis J. (2001). Irish Kings and High Kings. Four Courts Press. ISBN 9781851821969.
- Connolly, S. J. (2007). Oxford Companion to Irish History. Oxford University Press. ISBN 978-0-19-923483-7.
- Duffy, Seán (2014). Brian Boru and the Battle of Clontarf. Gill & Macmillan. ISBN 978-0-7171-6207-9.==External links==
- Ancient Laigin (Archived)
- Tribes of Laigin (Archived)
- Breassal Breac DNA
- Early Leinster genealogies
