= Uí Dúnlainge =

Dynasty of Irish kings

The Uí Dúnlainge, from the Old Irish "grandsons (or descendants) of Dúnlaing", were an Irish dynasty of Leinster kings who traced their descent from Dúnlaing mac Énda Niada, a fifth-century King of Leinster. He was said to be a cousin of Énnae Cennsalach, eponymous ancestor of the rival Uí Ceinnselaig.

Their claims to the kingship of Leinster were unopposed after the death of Áed mac Colggen in the Battle of Ballyshannon on 19 August 738. Three of the sons of Murchad mac Brain (d. 727), Dunchad, Faelan and Muiredach reigned in turn after him as kings of Leinster. These kings were progenitors of the most powerful branches of Uí Dunlainge in the following three centuries: Uí Dunchada, Uí Faelain and Uí Muiredaig. These three kindreds rotated the kingship of Leinster between them from 750 to 1050. This is unusual in early Irish history as it was the equivalent of "keeping three oranges in the air" (the east Ulster kingdom of Ulaid also rotated the kingship between families). Fourteen Uí Muiredaig kings (from whom descend the O'Toole family) were based at Mullaghmast/Máistín. Nine Uí Faelain kings (from whom descend the O'Byrne family) were based at Naas/Nás na Ríogh and ten Uí Dúnchada kings (later known as the MacGillaMo-Cholmoc and, after the Norman invasion, renamed the FitzDermots) were based at Lyons Hill/ Líamhain nearest to Dublin city. By the end of this remarkable run, the kingship of Leinster was being rotated between seventh cousins.

The Fitzdermots later gave their names to the placenames Dolphin's Barn and Ballyfermot.

The influence of the Uí Dúnlainge family helped secure place-myths for prominent Kildare landmarks in the heroic and romantic literature such as the Dindseanchas, Dinnshenchas Érenn as one of the "assemblies and noted places in Ireland".

After the death of the last Kildare-based King of Laighin, Murchad Mac Dunlainge in 1042, the Kingship of Leinster reverted to the Uí Ceinnselaig kindred based in the south-east of Leinster.

== See also ==
- Laigin
- Irish nobility
- Irish royal families
