= List of conflicts in Ireland =

This is a list of conflicts in Ireland, including wars, armed rebellions, battles and skirmishes.

== List of wars and rebellions in Ireland ==
Year(s)	Conflict	Notes
917–1014	Viking wars in Ireland	
1169–75	Norman invasion of Ireland	
1315–18	Bruce campaign in Ireland	Part of the First War of Scottish Independence
1333–38	Burke Civil War	A conflict among the House of Burke
1534–1603	Tudor conquest of Ireland	Includes Kildare Rebellion 1534, First Desmond Rebellion 1569–73, Second Desmond Rebellion 1579–83 and Nine Years' War 1594–1603
1641–53	Irish Confederate Wars	Includes, Irish Rebellion of 1641 1641–42 and Cromwellian conquest of Ireland 1649–53
1689–91	Williamite–Jacobite War	Part of the War of the Grand Alliance
1798	Irish Rebellion of 1798	
1803	Irish Rebellion of 1803	
1831–36	Tithe War	
1848	Young Irelander Rebellion	
1867	Fenian Rising	
1870–93	Land War	
1916	Easter Rising	Part of the Irish revolutionary period
1919–22	Irish War of Independence	Part of the Irish revolutionary period
1922–23	Irish Civil War	Part of the Irish revolutionary period
1942–44	Northern Campaign	Irish republican campaign against the state of Northern Ireland
1956–62	Border Campaign	Irish republican campaign against the state of Northern Ireland
1968–98	The Troubles	The Troubles was a violent conflict (1960s–1998) in Northern Ireland between nationalists and unionists, ending with the Good Friday Agreement.
1996–Present	Dissident Irish republican campaign	The Dissident Irish republican campaign is an ongoing conflict by paramilitary groups opposing the Good Friday Agreement, using violence to seek a united Ireland.

== List of battles in Ireland ==
=== Prehistoric era ===
The Annals of the Four Masters, written in the 17th century, records a number battles as having taken place in prehistoric Ireland. These include:

- 2530 AM (Anno Mundi) – Battle of Mag Itha, the first recorded battle in Ireland
- 3304 AM – First Battle of Magh Tuireadh
- 3330 AM – Second Battle of Magh Tuireadh
- 76 AD (Anno Domini) – Battle at the hill of Achall (Túathal Techtmar defeats Elim mac Conrach)
- 195 AD – Battle of Maigh Mucruimhe
- 226 AD – Crinna, in Brega
- 283 AD – Cath Gabhra (the Battle of Gowra)
- 331 AD – Battle of Achadh Leith-dheirg

=== 5th Century CE ===
Many of the battles in the 5th century feature ongoing conflicts between Laigin, a likely variation on the Kingdom of Leinster, and Aillil Molt, a king of Connacht and possible High King of Ireland. Later conflicts feature additional kingdoms including Coirpre (Coipre himself had established a strong presence in the midlands and his descendants would establish three kingdoms in his name) and Dál Aráidhe. Additionally, various High Kings of Ireland appeared intermittently in the conflicts.

Battles of the 5th Century CE
Date	Battle	Details
459	Ath Dara	
468	Battle of Duma Aichir	First given date for the battle of Duma Aichir (Dumagh Aicher), which Laigen (Laigin, the Lagenians) won over Aillil Molt (Oillil Molt). Duplicate instances of the same battle as listed in the Annals of Ulster (AU), Chronicon Scotorum (CS), and the Annals of Inisfallen (AI) are listed below. This specific instance is said to have been recorded in the Book of Cuanu, a lost Irish Annal.
470	Battle of Duma Aichir	Second given date for the battle of Duma Aichir won over Aillil Molt (AI).
471	Brí Éile (Brí Ele) melee	Aillil Molt victory over Laigin (CS). Alternate date recorded in the Annals of Ulster is listed below.
472	Battle of Duma Aichir	Third given date for the battle of Duma Aichir won over Aillil Molt (CS).
473	Brí Éile (Brí Ele) melee	Alternate date for Aillil Molt victory over the Laigin (AU).
474	Battle of Duma Aichir	Fourth given date for the battle of Duma Aichir won over Aillil Molt (AU).
476	Battle of Duma Aichir	Fifth given date for the battle of Duma Aichir won over Aillil Molt (AU).
478	Battle of Ocha (Ochae)	
482	Battle of Ocha (Ochae)	Aillil Molt defeat. The entry in the Chronicon Scotorum reads: Kal. i. A.D.482 Oilill Molt fell in the battle of Ocha by Muircertach Mac Erca (i.e. King of Erinn); and by Lughaidh, son of Laeghaire; and by Fergus Cirrbel, son of Conall Crimthainn; and by Fiachra Lonn, son of Caelboth, King of Dál Aráidhe, of which Bec Mac De said: 1. The great battle of Ocha was fought, Through which many fights were contested; Over Oilill Molt, son of Dathi, It was gained by the Dál Aráidhe, By Lughaidh, by Fiachra Lonn, And by the great, puissant Muircertach, By Fergus, son of mild Conall— By them fell the noble King Ailill; And by Fergus of the blemish— By them fell the noble Ailill Molt.
485	First Battle of Granard (Graineret, Granairet, Graine, Grane)	A victory by either Coirpre (Cairpre) or Muirchertach Mac Erca (Mac Erce) over Laigin. Finnchad, King of Laigin, fell. Alternate dates are provided below.
486	First Battle of Granard (Graineret, Granairet, Graine, Grane)	Alternate date provided by the Annals of Ulster. A victory by either Coirpre (Cairpre) or Muirchertach Mac Erca (Mac Erce) over Laigin.
489	Battle of Taillten (Tailten, Tailtiu)	
490	Battle of Cell Losnada (Losnaig)	Battle in the plains of Mag Fea (near modern-day Kildare) "in which fell Aengus son of Nad-fraích, king of Mumu," according to the Book of Cuanu (AU). Alternate dates are listed below.
491	Battle of Taillten (Tailten, Tailtiu)	A victory by Coirpre over the Lagenians (CS).
492	Sleamhain (Slemain) in Meath (Mide)	
492	Second Battle of Granard (Granairet, Grainaret, Graine, Grane)	Coirpre victory over the Kingdom of Leinster by Eochu (Eochaidh), son of Coirpre. Freach, son of Finnchad and King of Laigin died (CS).
493	Battle for the Body of St. Patrick	
493	Srath Echaill	In which "Fraech son of Finnchad, king of Laigin, fell, and Eochu, son of Cairpre, was victor." The Annals of Ulster, Annals of Tigernach, and Chronicon Scotorum identify this battle as the Second Battle of Granard (listed above and below).
494	Battle of Taillten (Tailten, Tailtiu)	Date for the Battle of Taillten provided by the Annals of Ulster (AU) and the Annals of Tigernach (AT). A victory by Coirpre over the Lagenians.
494	Cenn Ailbe (Ceann Ailbhe)	
494	Sleamhain (Slemain, Sleamain) of Meath (Mide)	Coirpre victory over Laigin (CS). Alternate dates listed in the Annals of Ulster (AU) and the Annals of Tigernach (AT) listed below.
495	Second Battle of Granard (Granairet, Grainaret, Graine, Grane)	Date for the Second Battle of Granard provided by the Annals of Ulster and Annals of Tigernach. Coirpre victory over the Kingdom of Leinster by Eochu (Eochaidh), son of Coirpre. Freach, son of Finnchad and King of Laigin died.
496	Druim Lochmaighe	Leinster victory over Uí Neill, Annals of the Four Masters (AFM). Alternate dates are provided below.
496	Battle of Cenn Ailbe	Coirpre victory over Leinster (CS). Alternate dates listed below.
497	Inde Mor, in Crioch Ua nGabhla	
497	Sleamhain (Slemain, Sleamain) of Meath (Mide)	Date provided in the Annals of Tigernach. Coirpre victory over Laigin.
499	Seaghais	Possible alternate spelling of Sleamhain (Slemain, Sleamain)
499	Sleamhain (Slemain, Sleamain) of Meath (Mide)	Date provided in the Annals of Ulster. Coirpre victory over Laigin.
499	Battle of Cenn Ailbe	Date provided in the Annals of Tigernach. Coirpre victory over Leinster (Laigin) (AT).

- 459 – Ath Dara
- 468 – Battle of Duma Aichir - First given date for the battle of Duma Aichir (Dumagh Aicher), which Laigen (Laigin, the Lagenians) won over Aillil Molt (Oillil Molt). Subsequent instances of the same battle as listed in the Annals of Ulster (AU), Chronicon Scotorum (CS), and the Annals of Inisfallen (AI) are listed below. This specific instance is said to have been recorded in the Book of Cuanu, a lost Irish Annal.
- 470 – Battle of Duma Aichir - Second given date for the battle of Duma Aichir won over Aillil Molt (AI).
- 471 - Brí Éile (Brí Ele) melee - Aillil Molt victory over Laigin (CS). Alternate date recorded in the Annals of Ulster is listed below.
- 472 - Battle of Duma Aichir - Third given date for the battle of Duma Aichir won over Aillil Molt (CS).
- 473 - Brí Éile (Brí Ele) melee - Alternate date for Aillil Molt victory over the Laigin (AU).
- 474 - Battle of Duma Aichir - Fourth given date for the battle of Duma Aichir won over Aillil Molt (AU).
- 476 - Battle of Duma Aichir - Fifth given date for the battle of Duma Aichir won over Aillil Molt (AU).
- 478 – Ocha
- 482 – Battle of Ocha (Ochae) - Aillil Molt defeat. The entry in the Chronicon Scotorum reads:

Kal. i. A.D.482 Oilill Molt fell in the battle of Ocha by Muircertach Mac Erca (i.e. King of Erinn); and by Lughaidh, son of Laeghaire; and by Fergus Cirrbel, son of Conall Crimthainn; and by Fiachra Lonn, son of Caelboth, King of Dál Aráidhe, of which Bec Mac De said:

1. The great battle of Ocha was fought, Through which many fights were contested; Over Oilill Molt, son of Dathi, It was gained by the Dál Aráidhe, By Lughaidh, by Fiachra Lonn, And by the great, puissant Muircertach, By Fergus, son of mild Conall— By them fell the noble King Ailill; And by Fergus of the blemish— By them fell the noble Ailill Molt.
- 485 - First Battle of Granard (Graineret, Granairet, Graine, Grane) - a victory by either Coirpre (Cairpre) or Muirchertach Mac Erca (Mac Erce) over Laigin. Finnchad, King of Laigin, fell.
- 486 - First Battle of Granard - alternate date provided by the Annals of Ulster.
- 489 – Tailtin
- 490 - Battle of Cell Losnada (Losnaig) - battle in the plains of Mag Fea (near modern-day Kildare) "in which fell Aengus son of Nad-fraích, king of Mumu," according to the Book of Cuanu (AU). Alternate dates are listed below.
- 491 - Battle of Taillten (Tailten, Tailtiu) - a victory by Coirpre over the Lagenians (CS).
- 491 – Cell Losnaid
- 492 – Sleamhain (Slemain) in Meath (Mide)
- 492 - Second Battle of Granard (Granairet, Grainaret, Graine, Grane) - Coirpre victory over the Kingdom of Leinster by Eochu (Eochaidh), son of Coirpre. Freach, son of Finnchad and King of Laigin died (CS).
- 493 – Battle for the Body of St. Patrick
- 493 - Srath Echaill - in which "Fraech son of Finnchad, king of Laigin, fell, and Eochu, son of Cairpre, was victor." The Annals of Ulster, Annals of Tigernach, and Chronicon Scotorum identify this battle as the Second Battle of Granard (listed above and below).
- 494 - Battle of Taillten - date for the Battle of Taillten provided by the Annals of Ulster (AU) and the Annals of Tigernach (AT).
- 494 – Ceann Ailbhe
- 494 - Sleamhain (Slemain, Sleamain) of Meath (Mide) - Coirpre victory over Laigin (CS). Alternate dates listed in the Annals of Ulster (AU) and the Annals of Tigernach (AT) listed below.
- 495 - Second Battle of Granard (Granairet, Grainaret, Graine, Grane) - date for the Second Battle of Granard provided by the Annals of Ulster and Annals of Tigernach.
- 496 – Druim Lochmaighe
- 496 - Battle of Cenn Ailbe - Coirpre victory over Leinster (CS). Alternate dates listed below.
- 497 – Inde Mor, in Crioch Ua nGabhla
- 497 - Sleamhain (Slemain, Sleamain) of Meath (Mide) - date provided in the Annals of Tigernach. Coirpre victory over Laigin.
- 499 – Seaghais
- 499 - Sleamhain (Slemain, Sleamain) of Meath (Mide) - date provided in the Annals of Ulster. Coirpre victory over Laigin.
- 499 - Battle of Cenn Ailbe - date provided in the Annals of Tigernach. Coirpre victory over Leinster (Laigin) (AT).

=== 6th Century CE ===
The 6th century features several conflicts between various groups within the kingdoms of Leinster, Uí Neill, and Connacht.

Battles of the 6th Century CE
Date	Battle	Details
500	Druim Lochmaige (Lochmagh)	
501	Battle of Freamhain (Fréamu), in Meath	A battle between Failge Berraidhe (Berraide) and Fiacha, son of Niall. Failge Berraide was victor. The entry in the Annals of the Four Masters reads: The battle of Freamhain, in Meath, against Fiacha, son of Niall, by Failge Berraidhe, concerning which this quatrain was composed: 1. The other king whom I shall mention was Fiacha, son of Niall, I shall not conceal him; It was against him, contrary to a false prophecy, the battle of Freamhain in Meath, was gained.; Alternate dates are provided below.
501	Battle of Cenn Ailbe	Coirpre victory over Laigin. Date provided by the Annals of Ulster.
503	Druim Lochmaige	Leinster (Laigin) victory over Uí Neill. Date provided by the Annals of Ulster.
506	Battle of Luachair	Coirpre (Cairpre, Cucorb) victory over Uí Neill (Uibh Neill). Illann (Illada), son of Dunlaing, King of Leinster (Laigen, Laighen), died. Poems in the Annals of the Four Masters, Annals of Tigernach, and Chronicon Scotorum reference the miraculous appearance of Saint Brigit. Alternate dates are provided below.
507	Battle of Druim Deargaighe (Derga, Deargaige) in Meath	Victory by Fiacha (Fiachaidh), son of Niall, over Failge Berraidhe (Foilghe, Berraide) presumed king in Leinster (Laigin). A significant portion of the plain of Meath (Mide, Midhe) spanning from Cluain In Dibhair (modern location unknown; possibly located in County Offaly) to Uisneach (Uisnech) was captured. The poet Ceannfaeladh (Cennfaeladh, Cendfaeladh) composed a poem about the battle that is featured in the Annals of the Four Masters, Annals of Tigernach, and the Chronicon Scotorum. Alternate dates are provided below.
510	Battle of Freamhain (Fréamu), in Meath	A battle between Failge Berraidhe (Berraide) and Fiacha, son of Niall. Failge Berraide was victor. Date provided by the Annals of Ulster.
512	Battle of Druim Deargaighe (Derga, Deargaige) in Meath	Victory by Fiacha (Fiachaidh), son of Niall, over Failge Berraidhe (Foilghe, Berraide) presumed king in Leinster (Laigin). A significant portion of the plain of Meath (Mide, Midhe) spanning from Cluain In Dibhair (modern location unknown; possibly located in County Offaly) to Uisneach (Uisnech) was captured. The poet Ceannfaeladh (Cennfaeladh, Cendfaeladh) composed a poem about the battle that is featured in the Annals of the Four Masters, Annals of Tigernach, and the Chronicon Scotorum. Date provided by the Chronicon Scotorum.
513	Battle of Druim Deargaighe (Derga, Deargaige) in Meath	Victory by Fiacha (Fiachaidh), son of Niall, over Failge Berraidhe (Foilghe, Berraide) presumed king in Leinster (Laigin). A significant portion of the plain of Meath (Mide, Midhe) spanning from Cluain In Dibhair (modern location unknown; possibly located in County Offaly) to Uisneach (Uisnech) was captured. The poet Ceannfaeladh (Cennfaeladh, Cendfaeladh) composed a poem about the battle that is featured in the Annals of the Four Masters, Annals of Tigernach, and the Chronicon Scotorum. Date provided by the Annals of Inisfallen.
514	Battle of Druim Deargaighe (Derga, Deargaige) in Meath	Victory by Fiacha (Fiachaidh), son of Niall, over Failge Berraidhe (Foilghe, Berraide) presumed king of Leinster (Laigin). A significant portion of the plain of Meath (Mide, Midhe) spanning from Cluain In Dibhair (modern location unknown; possibly located in County Offaly) to Uisneach (Uisnech) was captured. The poet Ceannfaeladh (Cennfaeladh, Cendfaeladh) composed a poem about the battle that is featured in the Annals of the Four Masters, Annals of Tigernach, and the Chronicon Scotorum. Date provided by the Annals of Tigernach.
524	Battle of Luachair	Coirpre (Cairpre, Cucorb) victory over Uí Neill (Uibh Neill). Illann (Illada), son of Dunlaing, King of Leinster (Laigen, Laighen), died. Date provided by the Chronicon Scotorum.
525	Battle of Luachair	Coirpre (Cairpre, Cucorb) victory over Uí Neill (Uibh Neill). Illann (Illada), son of Dunlaing, King of Leinster (Laigen, Laighen), died. Date provided by the Annals of Tigernach.
531	Battle of Claenloch in Cinel Aedh	"...in which Maine son of Cearbhall (Cerball) fell defending the hostages of Uí Maine of Connacht. Goibnenn son of Conall king of Uí Fiachrach Aidhne was the victor (AT)." Date provided in the Annals of the Four Masters. Alternate dates are provided below.
537	Battle of Claenloch in Cinel Aedh	Maine son of Cerball died defending hostages of Uí Maine of Connacht. Goibnenn son of Conall and king of Uí Fiachrach Aidhne, was the victor. Date provided by the Annals of Tigernach.
537	Battle of Sligeach (Sligech, Sligo, Slicech)	Eogan Bél (Eoghan Bel), King of Connacht (Connachta), was slain by Fergus and Domnall, sons of Muircheartach mac Earca, king of the Uí Néill; Ainmire (Ainmuire, Ainmere), son of Senna (Setna); and Nindigh (Naindid), son of Duach (Dauí), founder of the Cenél nDuach, and grandson of Conall Gulban, from whom descended the Cenél Conaill, a series of septs of the Northern Uí Néill. The verse listed in the Annals of the Four Masters reads: 1. The battle of the Ui Fiachrach was fought with fury of edged weapons against Bel, The kine of the enemy roared with the javelins, the battle was spread out at Crinder.; 2. The Sligeach bore to the great sea the blood of men with their flesh, They carried many trophies across Eabha, together with the head of Eoghan Bel.; Date provided by the Annals of the Four Masters. Alternate dates are listed below.
538	Battle of Claenloch in Cinel Aedh	Maine son of Cerball died defending hostages of Uí Maine of Connacht. Goibnenn son of Conall and king of Uí Fiachrach Aidhne was the victor. Date provided by the Annals of Ulster and Chronicon Scotorum.
540	Battle of Claenloch in Cinel Aedh	Maine son of Cerball died defending hostages of Uí Maine of Connacht. Goibnenn son of Conall and king of Uí Fiachrach Aidhne was the victor. Date provided by the Annals of Inisfallen.
542	Battle of Tortan (Tortu)	Victory by the Lagenians. Mac Erca, son of Aillil Molt, fell (AT). Alternate dates are listed below.
542	Battle of Sligeach (Sligech, Sligo, Slicech)	Eogan Bél (Eoghan Bel), King of Connacht (Connachta), was slain by Fergus and Domnall, sons of Muircheartach mac Earca, king of the Uí Néill; Ainmire (Ainmuire, Ainmere), son of Senna (Setna); and Nindigh (Naindid), son of Duach (Dauí), founder of the Cenél nDuach, and grandson of Conall Gulban, from whom descended the Cenél Conaill, a series of septs of the Northern Uí Néill. The verse listed in the Annals of Tigernach reads: 1. The battle of Uí Fiachrach is fought With fury of edges over the border, Foemen's kine bellow against spears, The battle was spread out into Crinder.; 2. The Sligo river carried off to the great sea Men's blood with their flesh, They utter paeans over Eba Round the head of Eogan Bél.; Date provided by the Annals of Tigernach. Alternate dates are listed below.
543	Battle of Tortan (Tortu)	Victory by the Lagenians. Mac Erca, son of Aillil Molt, fell. Date provided by the Chronicon Scotorum.
543	Battle of Sligeach (Sligech, Sligo, Slicech)	Eogan Bél (Eoghan Bel), King of Connacht (Connachta), was slain by Fergus and Domnall, sons of Muircheartach mac Earca, king of the Uí Néill; Ainmire (Ainmuire, Ainmere), son of Senna (Setna); and Nindigh (Naindid), son of Duach (Dauí), founder of the Cenél nDuach, and grandson of Conall Gulban, from whom descended the Cenél Conaill, a series of septs of the Northern Uí Néill. The verse listed in the Chronicon Scotorum reads: 1. The battle of Ui Fiachrach is fought, With the fury of edged weapons, against Bel; The enemy's kine roar at lances; The battle is spread out at Crinder.; 2. The blood of men, with their flesh; Trophies are carried across Ebha, With the head of Eoghan Bel.; Date provided by the Chronicon Scotorum. Alternate dates are listed below.
544	Battle of Cuil (Cúil) Conaire	Ailill "The Womanly" Inbhanda (Ibanda), king of Connacht and son of Eogan (Eoghan), and his brother Aodh (Aedh, Aed) "The Prevailing" Fortamhail (Fortobol, Fortamail), were slain by Fergus (Fearghus, Forgus) and Domhnall (Domnall), sons of Mac Erca (Earca), the king of the Uí Néill. Date provided by the Annals of the Four Masters. Alternate dates are listed below.
546	Battle of Tortan (Tortu)	Victory by the Lagenians. Mac Erca, son of Aillil Molt, fell. Date provided by the Annals of Inisfallen.
546	Battle of Cuilne (Cuilen)	Corco (Corcu) Oiche (Óche, Oche, Corcoiche) of Munster (Mumu) was slain through the prayers of St. Ida (Íta) of Cluain Creadhail (Credail). Date provided by the Annals of the Four Masters. Alternate dates are listed below.
546	Battle of Sligeach (Sligech, Sligo, Slicech)	Eogan Bél (Eoghan Bel), King of Connacht (Connachta), was slain by Fergus and Domnall, sons of Muircheartach mac Earca, king of the Uí Néill; Ainmire (Ainmuire, Ainmere), son of Senna (Setna); and Nindigh (Naindid), son of Duach (Dauí), founder of the Cenél nDuach, and grandson of Conall Gulban, from whom descended the Cenél Conaill, a series of septs of the Northern Uí Néill. Date provided by the Annals of Inisfallen.
547	Battle of Sligeach (Sligech, Sligo, Slicech)	Eogan Bél (Eoghan Bel), King of Connacht (Connachta), was slain by Fergus and Domnall, sons of Muircheartach mac Earca, king of the Uí Néill; Ainmire (Ainmuire, Ainmere), son of Senna (Setna); and Nindigh (Naindid), son of Duach (Dauí), founder of the Cenél nDuach, and grandson of Conall Gulban, from whom descended the Cenél Conaill, a series of septs of the Northern Uí Néill. Date provided by the Annals of Ulster.
548	Battle of Tortan (Tortu)	Victory by the Lagenians. Mac Erca, son of Aillil Molt, fell. Date provided by the Annals of Ulster.
548	Battle of Sligeach (Sligech, Sligo, Slicech)	Eogan Bél (Eoghan Bel), King of Connacht (Connachta), was slain by Fergus and Domnall, sons of Muircheartach mac Earca, king of the Uí Néill; Ainmire (Ainmuire, Ainmere), son of Senna (Setna); and Nindigh (Naindid), son of Duach (Dauí), founder of the Cenél nDuach, and grandson of Conall Gulban, from whom descended the Cenél Conaill, a series of septs of the Northern Uí Néill. Alternate date provided by the Annals of Ulster.
549	Battle of Cuil (Cúil) Conaire	Ailill "The Womanly" Inbhanda (Ibanda), king of Connacht and son of Eogan (Eoghan), and his brother Aodh (Aedh, Aed) "The Prevailing" Fortamhail (Fortobol, Fortamail), were slain by Fergus (Fearghus, Forgus) and Domhnall (Domnall), sons of Mac Erca (Earca), the king of the Uí Néill. Date provided by the Annals of Tigernach. Alternate dates are listed below.
550	Battle of Cuil (Cúil) Conaire	Ailill "The Womanly" Inbhanda (Ibanda), king of Connacht and son of Eogan (Eoghan), and his brother Aodh (Aedh, Aed) "The Prevailing" Fortamhail (Fortobol, Fortamail), were slain by Fergus (Fearghus, Forgus) and Domhnall (Domnall), sons of Mac Erca (Earca), the king of the Uí Néill. Date provided by the Annals of Ulster and the Chronicon Scotorum.
551	Battle of Cuilne (Cuilen)	Corco (Corcu) Oiche (Óche, Oche, Corcoiche) of Munster (Mumu) was slain through the prayers of St. Ida (Íta) of Cluain Creadhail (Credail). Date provided by the Annals of Tigernach. Alternate dates are listed below.
552	Battle of Cuilne (Cuilen)	Corco (Corcu) Oiche (Óche, Oche, Corcoiche) of Munster (Mumu) was slain through the prayers of St. Ida (Íta) of Cluain Creadhail (Credail). Date provided by the Annals of Ulster and the Chronicon Scotorum. Alternate dates are listed below.
553	Battle of Cuilne (Cuilen)	Corco (Corcu) Oiche (Óche, Oche, Corcoiche) of Munster (Mumu) was slain through the prayers of St. Ida (Íta) of Cluain Creadhail (Credail). Date provided by the Annals of Inisfallen. Alternate dates are listed below.

- 500 – Lochmagh
- 501 – Freamhain, in Meath
- 501 - Battle of Cenn Ailbe - alternate date listed in the Annals of Ulster. Coirpre victory over Laigin (AU).
- 506 – Luachair
- 507 – Druim Deargaighe
- 528 – Luachair
- 531 – Claenloch
- 537 – Sligeach
- 544 – Cuil Conaire
- 546 – Cuilne
- 556 – Cuil Uinnsenn
- 560 – Battle of Cúl Dreimhne ('Battle of the Book')
- 561 – Cul Dremne
- 563 – Moin Dairi Lothar
- 571 – Battle of Tola
- 572 – Battle of Doete
- 579 – Druim Mic Earca
- 585 – Kalketh
- 590 – Eadan Mor
- 594 – Dun Bolg
- 597 – Battle of Sleamhain
- 598 – Eachros

=== 7th century ===
- 600 – Loch Semhedidhe
- 601 – Battle of Slaibhre
- 622 – Carn Fearadhaigh
- 622 – Lethed Midinn
- 624 – Ard Corainn
- 626 – Leathairbhe
- 628 – Ath Goan
- 634 – Magh Rath
- 637 – Battle of Moira
- 645 – Carn Conaill
- 648 – Cuil Corra
- 656 – Fleasach
- 660 – Ogamhain
- 666 – Battle of Aine
- 681 – Bla Sléibe
- 685 – Cenn Conn
- 686 – Leach Phich
- 688 – Imlech
- 696 – Tulach Garraisg

=== 8th century ===
- 701 – Corann
- 702 – Claen Ath
- 713 – Cam Feradaig
- 718 – Battle of Almhain
- 719 – Delgean
- 721 – Druim Fornocht
- 724 – Cenn Deilgden
- 727 – Magh Itha
- 730 – Bealach Ele
- 732 – Fochart
- 733 – Battle of Ath Seanaith
- 738 – Ceanannus
- 744 – Ard Cianachta
- 749 – Ard Naescan
- 751 – Bealach Cro
- 759 – Dun Bile
- 762 – Caill Tuidbig
- 766 – Cath Sruthair
- 769 – Bolg Boinne
- 781 – Ath Liacc Finn
- 787 – Ard Mic Rime

=== 9th century ===
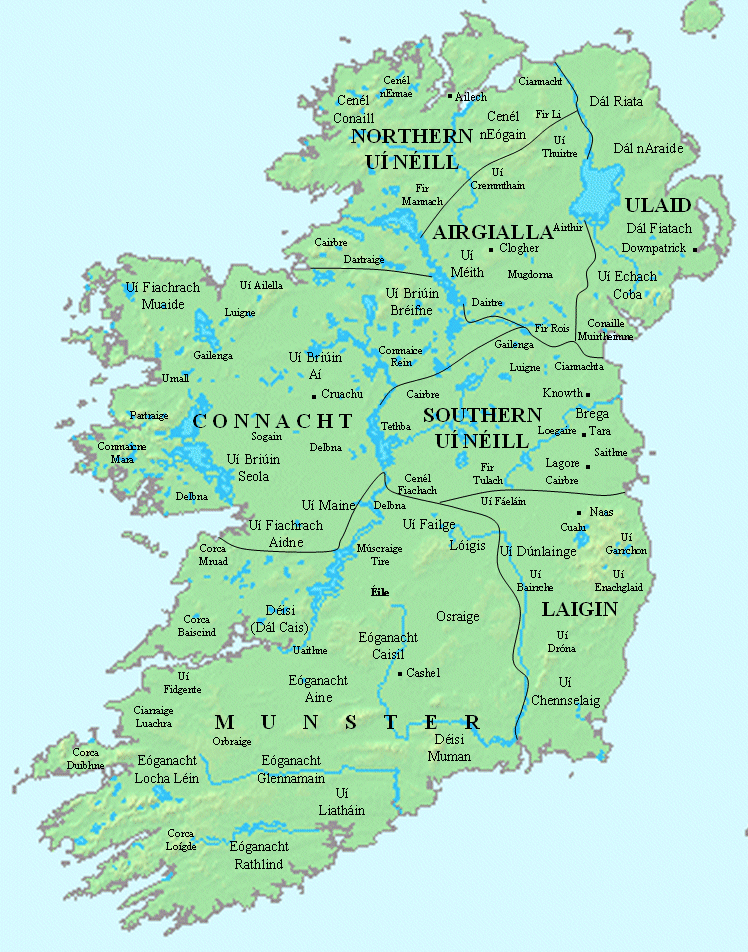
Early peoples and kingdoms of Ireland, c.800

- 800 – Ardrahan
- 820 – Carn Conain
- 845 – Dunamase
- 848 – Battle of Skryne
- 851 – Battle of Dundalk
- 877 – Battle of Strangford Lough

=== 10th century ===
- 908 – Battle of Bellaghmoon
- 917 – Battle of Confey
- 919 – Battle of Islandbridge
- 967/8 – Battle of Sulcoit
- 967/8 – Burning of Luimnech
- 977/8 – Battle of Cathair Cuan
- 978 – Battle of Belach Lechta
- 980 – Battle of Tara
- 994 – Sack of Domhnach Padraig
- 994 – Sack of Aenach Thete
- 999 – Battle of Glenmama

=== 11th century ===
- 1014 – Battle of Clontarf
- 1086 – Breach of Crinach
- 1087 – Conachail, in Corann
- 1087 – Rath Edair
- 1088 – Corcach
- 1090 – Magh Lena, in Meath
- 1094 – Bealach Gort an Iubhair
- 1094 – Fidhnacha
- 1095 – Ard Achad
- 1098 – Fearsat-Suilighe
- 1099 – Craebh Tulla

=== 12th century ===
- 1101 – Battle of Grianan
- 1103 – Battle of Magh Cobha
- 1132 – Siege of Dún Béal Gallimhe
- 1149 – Siege of Dún Béal Gallimhe
- 1151 – Battle of Móin Mhór
- 1169/05 – Beginning of the Norman invasion of Ireland
- 1169/05 – Battle of Duncormac, County Wexford – Norman victory over a combined Irish-Norse force
- 1169/05 – Siege of Wexford – Norman victory over a combined Irish-Norse force
- 1169/05 – Battle of Gowran – Norman defeat
- 1170/05 – Battle of Dundonnell (aka Battle of Baginbun), County Wexford – Norman victory over a combined Irish-Norse force
- 1170/08 – Battle of Waterford – Norman victory over a combined Irish-Norse force
- 1170/09 – Sack of Dublin – Norman victory over a combined Irish-Norse force
- 1171/08 – Siege of Dublin – Norman victory
- 1171 – Battle of Carrick – Norman defeat
- 1173 – Battle of Kilkenny – Norman defeat
- 1174 – Battle of Thurles – Norman defeat
- 1175 – Battle of Meath – Norman victory
- 1175 – Battle of Athlone – Norman victory
- 1175 – Battle of Drogheda – Norman victory
- 1176 – Battle of Meath – Norman defeat
- 1176 – Battle of Armagh – Norman defeat
- 1192 – Battle of Aughera – Norman defeat

=== 13th century ===
- 1224 – Sack of Ard Abla
- 1225 – Sack of Loch Nen
- 1225 – Sack of Ardrahan
- 1230 – Siege of Dún Béal Gallimhe
- 1230 – Findcairn
- 1232 – Siege of Dún Béal Gallimhe
- 1234 – Battle of the Curragh
- 1235 – Siege of Dún Béal Gallimhe
- 1247 – Battle of Ballyshannon
- 1247 – Siege of Dún Béal Gallimhe
- 1249 – First Battle of Athenry
- 1256 – Battle of Magh Slecht
- 1257 – Battle of Creadran Cille
- 1257 – Sack of Sligo
- 1260 – Battle of Druim Dearg
- 1261 – Battle of Callann
- 1270 – Battle of Áth-an-Chip

=== 14th century ===
==== Bruce Campaign ====
- 1315 – Battle of Carrickfergus
- 1315 – Battle of Moiry Pass (June)
- 1315 – First battle of Dundalk (June)
- 1315 – Battle of Connor (September)
- 1315 – Second battle of Dundalk (November)
- 1315 – Battle of Kells (December)
- 1316 – Battle of Skerries (January)
- 1316 – Second Battle of Athenry (August)
- 1317 – Battle of Lough Raska (August)
- 1318 – Battle of Dysert O'Dea (May)
- 1318 – Battle of Faughart (October)

- 1328 – Battle of Thomond
- 1329 – Braganstown massacre
- 1329 – Battle of Ardnocher
- 1330 – Battle of Fiodh-an-Átha
- 1333–1338 – Burke Civil War
- 1336 – Castlemore-Costello besieged and demolished by the King of Connacht
- 1340 – Battle of the O Cellaig's
- 1341 – Battle of the Clan Maurice
- 1342 – Battle of Beal-atha-Slisen – King of Connacht defeats the King of Moylurg
- 1343 – Battle of Hy-Many – MacFeorais and Clanricarde soundly defeat a small force from the Uí Maine. Achadhmona; battle between the O'Donnells, in Tirhugh
- 1345 – Battle of Lough Neagh – naval battle between Hugh O'Neill and the Clann Hugh Buidhe
- 1346 – Calry-Lough-Gill – O Rourke soundly defeated by the O Connors. Brian Mag Mathgamna defeats and kills 300 English somewhere in Thomond
- 1348 – Ballymote besieged and burned by MacDermot, O Connor defeated
- 1349 – O Melaghlin of Meath defeated in battle by the English
- 1355 – The English of West Connaught defeated Mac William Burke, and killed many of his people Clanricarde defeats the Mayo Bourkes and the Siol Anmchadha
- 1356 – Baile-Locha-Deacair
- 1358 – Hugh O Neill defeats the Fer Managh and Orial. O More defeats the English of Dublin in battle
- 1359 – Ballyshannon
- 1366 – Srath-Fear-Luirg
- 1368 – Oriel
- 1369 – Blencupa
- 1369 – Lough Erne – English of Munster and Desmond soundly defeated by O Brian, possibly at Limerick
- 1373 – Annaly
- 1374 – Niall O Neill defeats the English
- 1375 – Downpatrick – Niall O Neill defeats the English
- 1377 – Clann-Cuilein – Clanricarde and his allies defeated
- 1377 – Roscommon – Ruaidri O Conchobhair defeats the Mayo Burkes and the Uí Maine
- 1379 – Dreach – O Neill Mor defeats Maguire
- 1380 – Atha-leathann – Clanricarde defeated by Bourke of Mayo
- 1381 – Athlone
- 1383 – Trian Chongail – Hugh O Neill and Robin Savage kill each other in a cavalry charge
- 1384 – Carrickfergus "burned by Niall O'Neill, who thereupon acquired great power over the English"
- 1385 – Battle of Tochar Cruachain-Bri-Ele – O Conchobhair, King of Uí Falighe, soundly defeats the English of Meath
- 1389 – Caislen an Uabhair
- 1391 – Bealach-an-Chrionaigh
- 1392 – Ceann-Maghair
- 1394 – Battle of Ros-Mhic-Thriúin
- 1395 – Cruachain – the King of Uí Failghe defeats an English expedition. O Donnell defeats and captures the sons of Henry O Neill
- 1396 – Creag – O Conchobhair Roe defeats O Conchobhair Donn. O Tuathail of Lenister inflicts a severe defeat on the Anglo-Irish
- 1396 – Sligo – O Donnell and O Connor besiege and burn the town
- 1397 – Machaire Chonnacht
- 1397 – Bun-Brenoige
- 1398 – Eachdruim Mac n-Aodha – the O Tooles and O Byrnes defeat the Anglo-Irish, killing the Earl of March
- 1398 – Magh-Tuiredh – O Conchobair Roe and allies defeated by McDonagh
- 1399 – Battle of Tragh-Bhaile – the Anglo-Irish defeat the sons of Henry O Neill

=== 15th century ===
- 1400 – Dunamon.
- 1406 – Battle of Cluain Immorrais
- 1444 – Duibhthrian; Sligo burned by the O Donnells, Maguires and O Connors.
- 1446 – Cuil Ua bh-Fionntain
- 1449 – Muintir-Maelmora
- 1452 – Cloch-an-bhodaigh; Coirrshliabh na Seaghsa
- 1453 – Ardglass (naval battle)
- 1454 – Inis
- 1455 – Athlone: The castle of Athlone was taken from the English, having been betrayed by a woman who was in it.
- 1456 – Cuil Mic an Treoin (Friday 18 May)
- 1457 – Druim da Ethiar
- 1460 – Corca Bhaiscinn (naval battle)
- 1461 – Ceann Maghair
- 1462 – Waterford taken by the Butlers in a war with the FitzGeralds.
- 1462 – Lancastrian Butlers defeated by Yorkist FitzGeralds at Battle of Piltown in Wars of the Roses.
- 1464 – Sliabh Lugha
- 1465 – Carn Fraoich
- 1466 – Offaly; Anglo-Irish army defeated by O Connor
- 1467 – CrosMoighe-Croin
- 1468 – Beann-uamha; Scormor, in Clann Chathail mic Murray
- 1469 – Baile-an-Duibh; The Defeat of Glanog
- 1473 – Doire-Bhaile-na-Cairrge
- 1475 – Baile-Locha-Luatha
- 1476 – Beal Feirste (Belfast)
- 1478 – Sligo, and the siege of Carrig Lough Ce
- 1482 – Ath-na-gCeannaigheadh
- 1483 – Traghbhaile of Dundalk
- 1484 – Moin-Ladhraighe
- 1486 – Tirawley
- 1488 – two sieges of Carraig Lough Ce
- 1489 – Belfast castle demolished by O Donnell; Ballytober Bride sacked by O Connor Roe
- 1490 – Maigh Croghan
- 1493 – Glasdromainn; Beanna Boirche;
- 1494 – O Donnell besieges Sligo for several months in the summer, but is unsuccessful
- 1495 – O Donnell besieges Sligo again; battle of Beal an Droichit; siege of Ballyshannon; battle of Termon-Daveog; Siege of Waterford
- 1497 – Bealach-Buidhe; Beal Ath Daire.
- 1498 – Cros-Caibhdeanaigh. Dungannon.
- 1499 – Tulsk. First recorded death in Ireland from a bullet.

=== 16th century ===
- 1504 – Battle of Knockdoe – Fitzgeralds of Kildare defeat the Clanricarde Burkes
- 1522 – Battle of Knockavoe – Clash between O'Donnells and O'Neills
- 1534 – Battle of Salcock Wood- A force from Dublin is defeated by a coalition of the O'Tooles and Fitzgerald supporters.
- 1534 – Siege of Dublin Castle by 'Silken' Thomas Fitzgerald in Kildare
- 1535 – Siege of Maynooth Castle, the chief residence of Fitzgerald, by English forces
- 1539 – Battle of Bellahoe Ford – A force led by Leonard Grey routs an O'Donnell/O'Neill force
- 1557 – Battle of Binnion Hill, O'Donnell victory over the O'Neills
- 1559 – Battle of Spancel Hill, a conflict over the O'Brien succession
- 1565 – Battle of Glentasie – Shane O'Neill defeats the MacDonnells of Clan Iain Mor
- 1565 – Battle of Affane – Fitzgeralds of Desmond defeated by Butlers of Ormond
- 1567 – Battle of Farsetmore – Shane O'Neill defeated by O'Donnell clan
- 1570 – Battle of Shrule
- 1575 – Rathlin Island Massacre
- 1583 – Battle of Aura – McQuillans, MacDonnells and O'Neills fight for control of Dunluce Castle
- 1586 – Battle of Ardnaree – Mercenary Scots entering Connacht are surprised and destroyed by Bingham's army
- 1590 – Battle of Doire Leathan – part of the O'Donnell Succession dispute

==== Mac an Iarla War ====
c. 1570–1583, between the sons of Richard Burke, 2nd Earl of Clanricarde

==== Desmond Rebellions ====
First Desmond Rebellion (1569–1573)

- 1569 – Siege of Kilkenny
- 1569 – First Battle of Killamock
- 1571 – Second Battle of Kilmallock

Second Desmond Rebellion (1579–1583)

- 1579 – Aenachbeg
- 1579 – Sack of Youghal
- 1579 – Sack of Kinsale
- 1580 – Battle of Glenmalure
- 1580 – Siege of Carrigafoyle Castle
- 1580 – Siege of Smerwick
- 1582 – Allhallowtide

==== Spanish Armada ====
- 1588 – Crown mobilisation to capture survivors

=== 17th century ===
==== O'Doherty's Rebellion ====
- 1608- Burning of Derry
- 1608- Battle of Kilmacrennan: Ends Cahir O'Doherty's brief rebellion.
- 1608- Siege of Tory Island

==== Barbary Slave Trade ====
- 1631- Sack of Baltimore

=== 18th century ===
- 1760 – Battle of Carrickfergus – Carrickfergus seized by the French for five days.
- 1795 – Battle of the Diamond – a sectarian faction fight in County Armagh, that led to the founding of the Orange Order

==== United Irishmen Rebellion ====
- 24 May – Ballymore-Eustace, Naas, Prosperous, Kilcullen
- 25 May – Carlow
- 26 May – Tara Hill
- 27 May – Oulart Hill
- 28 May – Enniscorthy
- 30 May – Three Rocks
- 1 June – Bunclody
- 4 June – Tuberneering
- 5 June – New Ross
- 7 June – Antrim
- 9 June – Saintfield
- 9 June – Arklow
- 13 June – Ballinahinch
- 19 June – Ovidstown
- 20 June – Foulksmills
- 21 June – Vinegar Hill
- 30 June – Ballyellis
- 27 August – Castlebar
- 5 September – Collooney
- 7 September – Ballinamuck

Several fragments of the rebel armies of the Summer of 1798 survived to fight on both in the hope of the rebellion breaking out again and of French aid. The main guerrilla groupings were:

- June – November 1798 – Joseph Holt
- 23 July 1803 – Robert Emmet
- 1798 -1803 – Michael Dwyer
- 1798 – 1804 – James Corcoran

=== 19th century ===
- 1803 – Irish rebellion of 1803: failed republican uprising led by Robert Emmet.
- 1831–1836 – Tithe War: a period of rural insurgency over the payment of tithes to the Church of Ireland by non-members.
- 1848 – Young Ireland rebellion: failed Irish nationalist uprising by the Young Ireland group.
- 1867 – Fenian Rising: an abortive attempt at a nationwide rebellion by the Irish Republican Brotherhood.
- 1879–1882 – Land War: A period of agitation in rural Ireland led by The Irish National Land League, the main aims of the war were to get Free sale, fixity of tenure, and fair rent for the tenant farmers.

=== 20th century ===
==== Irish revolutionary period ====
Only the major engagements of this period are listed below.

- 1916 – Easter Rising

Irish War of Independence

- 1919 January 19 – Soloheadbeg Ambush
- 1920 October 22 - Tooreen ambush
- 1920 November 4 – Battle of Ballinalee
- 1920 November 28 – Kilmichael Ambush
- 1921 February 1 – Clonfin Ambush
- 1921 February 3 - Dromkeen ambush
- 1921 February 20 - Clonmult ambush
- 1921 February 25 – Coolavokig Ambush
- 1921 March 11 - Selton Hill ambush
- 1921 March 19 – Crossbarry Ambush
- 1921 March 21 - Headford Ambush
- 1921 March 23 - Scramoge ambush
- 1921 May 19 - Kilmeena ambush
- 1921 May 25 - Burning of the Custom House
- 1921 June 2 - Carrowkennedy ambush

Irish Civil War

- 1922 – Battle of Dublin
- 1922 – Irish Free State offensive
- 1922 – Battle of Kilmallock
- 1922 - Battle of Newport (County Mayo)
- 1922-23 - Guerrilla phase of the Irish Civil War

==== IRA Northern Campaigns ====
- 1942–1944 – First guerrilla campaign by the Irish Republican Army (1922–1969)
- 1956–1962 – Second guerrilla campaign by the Irish Republican Army (1922–1969)

==== The Troubles ====
- 1969 – Battle of the Bogside
- 1970 – Falls Curfew
- 1971 - Operation Demetrius
- 1972 - Bloody Sunday
- 1972 - Battle at Springmartin
- 1972 - Battle of Lenadoon
- 1972 - Operation Motorman
- 1972 - Springhill Massacre
- 1972 - Bloody Friday
- 1974 - Attack on UDR Clogher barracks
- 1975 - Drummuckavall ambush
- 1978 - Jonesboro Army Gazelle downing
- 1979 - Warrenpoint ambush
- 1984 - Kesh ambush
- 1985 - Strabane ambush
- 1985 - Newry mortar attack
- 1987 - Loughgall ambush
- 1988 - Ballygawley bus bombing
- 1989 - Attack on Derryard checkpoint
- 1990 - Derrygorry Army Gazelle downing
- 1990 - Operation Conservation
- 1991 - Mullacreevie ambush
- 1991 - Glenanne barracks bombing
- 1991 - Coagh ambush
- 1991 - Cappagh killings
- 1992 - Clonoe ambush
- 1992 - Attack on Cloghoge checkpoint
- 1992 - Coalisland riots
- 1992 - South Armagh sniper campaign
- 1993 - Battle of Newry Road
- 1993 - Fivemiletown ambush
- 1994 - Crossmaglen Army Lynx downing
- 1994 - 1994 Shankill Road killings
- 1997 - July riots

== See also ==
- List of Irish rebellions
- Military history of Ireland
- Irish military diaspora
