= Geoghegan =

Geoghegan (Irish: Mag Eochagáin) is a surname of Irish origin.

Often spelled without the prefix "Mac", the name has many variants, including Gehegan, Geoghan, Geohegan, Gahagan, Gagan, and Gagon which approximate the most common pronunciations of the name. It is usually pronounced /ˈɡeɪɡən/ GAY-gən, /ˈɡɛhəɡən/ GEH-hə-gən or /ˈɡoʊhɪɡən/ GOH-hig-ən. In Irish it is Mag Eochagáin, from "Eochaidh," a popular medieval Irish and Scottish Gaelic name deriving from Old Irish ech, meaning "horse." The initial "G" of Geoghegan comes from the prefix Mag, a variant of Mac and the anglicised form Mageoghegan or McGeoghegan was formerly much used.

== History ==
=== Correlation to ancient figures ===
The sept of the MacGeoghegans is of the southern Uí Néill, and said to be descended from Niall of the Nine Hostages. Niall was alive from the mid 4th century into the early 5th century. His father was Eochaid Mugmedón, of the line of Erimhon, one of the sons of Esbain who it is said took Ireland from the Tuatha de Danann.

Niall's mother was Carthann Cas Dubh, daughter of the king of Britain. Niall's first wife was Inné, mother of his son Fiachu mac Néill, from who the Geoghegan family are said to be descended. He also had seven other sons with his second wife, Roighnech. Niall's ancestry is claimed by Irish myth to trace back to Miledh of Esbain, King of Spain, whose wife Scota was the daughter of the Egyptian Pharaoh Nectanebo II. From there the line is sometimes traced to Niul who was married to the daughter of Pharaoh Cingris.

=== Niall of the Nine Hostages ===
Niall Noígíallach (Old Irish for "having nine hostages"), or in English, Niall of the Nine Hostages, was a prehistoric Irish king, the ancestor of the Uí Néill dynasties that dominated the northern half of Ireland from the 6th to the 10th century. Irish annalistic and chronicle sources place his reign in the late 4th and early 5th centuries, although modern scholars, through critical study of the annals, date him about half a century later. He is presumed by some to have been a real person, or at the very least semi-historical but most of the information about him that has come down to us is regarded as legendary. There are various versions of how Niall gained his epithet Noígíallach. The saga "The Death of Niall of the Nine Hostages" says that he received five hostages from the five provinces of Ireland (Ulster, Connacht, Leinster, Munster and Meath), and one each from Scotland, the Saxons, the Britons and the Franks. Keating says that he received five from the five provinces of Ireland, and four from Scotland. O'Rahilly suggests that the nine hostages were from the kingdom of the Airgialla (literally "hostage-givers"), a satellite state founded by the Ui Néill's conquests in Ulster, noting that the early Irish legal text Lebor na gCeart ("The Book of Rights") says that the only duty of the Airgialla to the King of Ireland was to give him nine hostages.

His son Fiachu mac Néill is said to be the ancestor of the Cenél Fiachach, a clan which included several well known sub-clans or septs such as Geoghegan and O'Higgins, whose lands extended from Birr to Uisnech in southern Westmeath and part of north Offaly and their southern territory became known as Fir Cell (land of the churches), and later the Barony of Moycashel. His son Túathal established a northern branch and his son Úathnemgenn a southern branch. Another son Crimthann was great-grandfather of a local saint Áed mac Bricc (died 589).

On the other hand, it is claimed in the early 15th-century manuscript called Leabhar Breac that the Geoghegans are descended, not from Fiachu, son of Niall, but from a plebeian, Fiachu, son of Aedh. This claim so enraged the descendants of Fiachu, that they killed the author of the passage, even though he was under the protection of Suanach, the abbot of the monastery of Rahin.

A branch of the MacGeoghegan sept settled in Bunowen, County Galway, and the name is found in that county as well as in their original territory. In the West it has been often shortened to Geoghan and even Gegan. In 1807, John Geoghegan of Bunowen Castle, County Galway assumed by royal licence the surname of O'Neill in lieu of Geoghegan and so his descendants.

== Moycashel lineages ==
The book Irish Pedigrees: Or, The Origin and Stem of the Irish Nation by John O'Hart lists the direct lineage from Niall of the Nine Hostages to the ancestors of the modern day Geoghegans and Gahagans. This lineage also includes the MacGuigan's and McGuigan's of North America and Australia.

== Notable Geoghegans ==
There have been several notable Geoghegans including:

- Chris Geoghegan (b.1954), British board member of BAE Systems, and President of the Society of British Aircraft Constructors,
- Conal MacGeoghegan (fl.1620–1640), Chief of the Sept, translator of the Annals of Clonmacnoise into English in 1627
- Eileen Grant McGeoghegan (1953-2022), American politician
- Helen Gahagan Douglas (1900–1980), American actress and Congresswoman from California
- Hugh Geoghegan, an Irish former footballer
- Hugh Geoghegan (1938–2024), Irish judge
- James MacGeoghegan (1702–1764), Irish priest and historian
- Joseph Bryan Geoghegan (1816–1889), English music hall song writer and performer.
- Máire Geoghegan-Quinn (b. 1950), Irish politician and former European Commissioner for Research, Innovation and Science,
- Michael Geoghegan (b. 1953), British former chief executive of HSBC
- Richard Henry Geoghegan (1866–1943), British linguist known for his study of native Alaskan languages and for introducing Esperanto to the anglophone world
- Richard Geoghegan (1717–1800), Irish landowner
- Richard MacGeoghegan (fl.1602), commanded the defenders at the siege of Dunboy Castle at Berehaven, County Cork in 1601
- Roche MacGeoghegan (1580–1644), Irish Dominican prelate, "saintly and enterprising" Bishop of Kildare
- Sally Geoghegan, English Grange Hill actress
- Simon Geoghegan (b.1968), Ireland rugby international player
- Tao Geoghegan Hart (b.1995), British professional cyclist with the Ineos Grenadiers cycling team
- Ted Geoghegan (b. 1979), American movie director known for his movie We Are Still Here
- Samuel Geoghehan (1845–1928), was the chief engineer at the Guinness brewery in Dublin during the late 1800s.
- Thomas Geoghegan (b. 1949), American labour lawyer and politician

== See also ==
- Castletown-Geoghegan
- Annals of the Four Masters
- O'Neill (surname)
- Gahagan
- Gallagher (surname)
- Eagan (disambiguation)
- Madden (disambiguation)
- List of kings of Strathclyde
