= Fergus mac Colmáin =

Fergus mac Colmáin (died 618) was a King of Uisnech in Mide, Ireland, of the Clann Cholmáin. He was the son of Colmán Már mac Diarmato (died 555/558) and brother of Suibne mac Colmáin (died 600), also kings of Uisnech. He ruled Uisnech from 600 to 618.

The feud between Clann Cholmáin and Síl nÁedo Sláine continued during his reign but the annals do not record any active involvement by Fergus. His nephew Conall Guthbinn mac Suibni (died 635) in 604 defeated the high king Áed Sláine mac Diarmato (died 604) at a battle in Faithche Mic Mencnain on the brink of Loch Semdid (Ballymore Loughsewdy, Co.Westmeath) in which the high king was slain. Also, his cousin Óengus mac Colmáin Bec (died 621) won the Battle of Odba in which Conall Laeg Breg mac Áedo Sláine was slain in 612.

In 618 he was slain by Anfartach Ua Mescáin of the people of Muintir Blaitíne (near Cuilne, Co.Louth). This was probably a private grudge.

== See also ==
- Kings of Uisnech
