= Maine mac Cerbaill =

Maine mac Cerbaill (died 538) was a king of Uisnech in Mide of the Ui Neill. He was the son of Fergus Cerrbél, grandson of Conall Cremthainne (died 480) and brother of the high king Diarmait mac Cerbaill (died 565). He ruled from 520 to 538.

Maine was defeated and slain at the Battle of Claenloch (near Kinelea, Co.Galway) by Goibnenn mac Conaill of the Ui Fiachrach Aidhne. Maine was attempting to secure the hostages of the Uí Maine. This battle marked the division of the Ui Maine subject to Connacht and the Cenél Maine of Tethba, subject to the Southern Ui Neill. It is also possible this battle took place at Clea Lake, near Keady in Armagh, which points to the origins of the family of Diarmait mac Cerbaill in the territory north of the Boyne and Blackwater.

== See also ==
- Kings of Uisnech
