= Bec mac Dé =

Bec mac Dé was a legendary Irish prophet, known from saga literature surrounding the historical High King Diarmait mac Cerbaill and from the Irish Annals, where he is said to have died c. 553–7.

In the saga Aided Diarmata ("the death of Diarmait") he is said to have been the best seer of his day, who could speak with nine men at once and answer all their questions in a single reply, and made an accurate prediction of the circumstances of Diarmait's death. Two saints, Ronan and Ciarán, had prophesied he would be killed by a roofbeam falling on his head. Bec gave a more elaborate prophecy of a threefold death: he would be drowned, burned, and have his head crushed by a roofbeam, by Áed Dub mac Suibni, in the house of Banbán the hospitaller, on a night that he wore a shirt grown from a single flax seed, drank ale brewed from a single grain of corn, and ate pork from a sow that had never farrowed. Diarmait dismissed these prophecies, even when invited to a feast by Banbán. His wife, who had been listening, refused to go, so Banbán offered the king his own daughter for that night, and gave him a nightshirt, pork and ale. When the girl told him the nightshirt had been woven from flax grown from a single seed, the ale had been brewed from a single grain of corn, and the pork had come from a sow that had never farrowed, Diarmait realised the prophecy had been fulfilled, and tried to escape, but Áed Dubh was standing at the door with his spear. As Diarmait fled back into the house, Áed's men set it on fire. Diarmait tried to escape the conflagration by leaping into a vat of ale, but a flaming roofbeam fell on his head, killing him.

A number of early Irish poems are attributed to him, including a prophecy "detailing the moral breakdown presaging the end of the world". The Annals of Ulster record his death under the years 552 and 557, the Chronicon Scotorum under 553, the Annals of Clonmacnoise under 550, and the Annals of the Four Masters, where he is considered a Christian saint, under 557.
