= Máel Dóid mac Suibni =

Máel Dóid mac Suibni (died 653) was a King of Uisnech in Mide of the Clann Cholmáin. He was the son Suibne mac Colmáin (died 600) and brother of Conall Guthbinn mac Suibni (died 635), previous kings. He ruled from 635 to 653.

This period in Meath history was dominated by the feud between Clann Cholmáin and Síl nÁedo Sláine among the southern Ui Neill. Mael Doid's father Suibne had been treacherously killed by his uncle Áed Sláine mac Diarmato (died 604) in 600. Mael Doid's brother Conall Guthbinn was killed by Diarmait mac Áedo Sláine (died 665) in 635.

In the year of Mael Doids accession, his cousins, of the Clann Cholmáin Bicc, Máel Umai and Colgu (sons of Óengus mac Colmáin Bec, died 621) were slain in battle by Diarmait. Two years later in 637, his nephew Airmetach Cáech mac Conaill Guthbinn was slain at the Battle of Mag Rath fighting for Congal Cáech of the Ulaid. The Síl nÁedo Sláine fought on the opposing and victorious side. Airmetach's son Fáelchú was also slain.

Mael Doid himself is only mentioned in the annals under his date of death. His son Feredach mac Máele Dóid was slain at a skirmish at Crannach in 697.

== See also ==
- Kings of Uisnech
