= Conall Mag Eochagáin =

Early 1600's Irish Historian

Conall Mag Eochagáin (also known as Conall Mac Eochagáin, and in Anglicised forms as Conall MacGeoghegan, also known as Conall Mac Geoghegan) fl. 1620–1640, head of his lineage, was a historian and translator from Lismoyny, Co. Westmeath. In 1627, he translated Annals of Clonmacnoise into English, and thus gaining him the title Conall the Historian.

== Biography ==
=== Family ===
Mag Eochagáin was a direct Geoghegan descendant of Niall of the Nine Hostages – specifically from the branch of Fiachu mac Néill.

His paternal grandmother, Gyles "Shiela" O'Dempsey was sister to Terence O'Dempsey, 1st Viscount Clanmalier.

It is speculated that he was born in 1592, in Lismoyny (County Westmeath), near Clara, County Offaly, to Anne Fitzgerald (or Fitz Thomas; d. 1580), and Neal/Niall Mag Eochagáin, brother of Roche MacGeoghegan.

His wife is thought to have been Margaret Coughlin – his only known sons being Conla, husband of Marian Molloy (daughter of Art M’Cahir Molloy, of Ralehyn), and Anthony, Bishop of Meath. If this were the case, that would make him a common ancestor of many Geoghegans and Gahagans.

He died in 1644.

=== The Annals of Clonmacnoise ===
The Annals of Clonmacnoise is also known as "Mageoghagan’s Book" in honor of MacGeoghegan's translating this history into Elizabethan English and preserving its memory.

Mag Eochagáin dedicated this translation to his brother-in-law, Toirdhealbhach Mac Cochláin (Terrence Coughlin), whose family was among the last to uphold and practice native Gaelic Irish customs.

The translation was completed on April 20, 1627, in the Castle of Lemanaghan in County Offaly. The original manuscript of MacGeoghegan's translation is lost, but there are several copies of it in both the Library of Trinity College and in the British Museum.

The original work was in Irish Gaelic. Mag Eochagáin more than once refers "to the ould Irish book out of which he wrote, to the old Irish book which he translates, out of which many leaves were lost or stolen.." MacGeoghegan seems to have preserved the value of the original Gaelic phraseology and rendered it every justice as far as we can determine in the absence of the original manuscript.

== See also ==
- Geoghegan (surname)
- Irish annals
- The Chronicle of Ireland
