= Richard Geoghegan =

Richard Geoghegan may refer to:

- Richard H. Geoghegan (1866–1943), British philologist and Esperantist
- Richard Geoghegan (Galway) (1717–1800), Irish agriculturist
