= Roque de la Cruz =

Roque de la Cruz may refer to:

- Roche MacGeoghegan (1580–1644), also known as Roque de la Cruz, Irish Dominican prelate and Tridentine reformist
- Roque de la Cruz (cyclist) (born 1964), Spanish racing cyclist
