= Óengus mac Colmáin =

Óengus mac Colmáin Bec (died 621) was an Irish king. He was the King of Uisnech in Mide from 618 to 621. He belonged to the southern Uí Néill. According to the genealogies, he was a son of Colmán Bec (died 587), son of Diarmait mac Cerbaill (died 565). The later Caílle Follamain traced their descent through Óengus.

Before acquiring the rulership of Uisnech, the annals record Oengus' involvement in the feud between the rival midland dynasties of Clann Cholmáin and Síl nÁedo Sláine. In 612 he won the Battle of Odba (near Navan, Co.Meath) in which Conall Laeg Breg mac Áedo Sláine was slain. This battle may have been caused by Conall's claims to succeed Áed Uaridnach as high king who died in 612.

He acquired the throne of Uisnech in 618 succeeding Fergus mac Colmáin. According to the Annals of Ulster, Oengus was killed in 621.

According to entries in the Irish annals reporting Óengus's death in 621, which incorrectly call him a son of Colmán Már, he was regis Nepotum Neill or ríg h-Úa Neill, that is king of the Uí Néill. This appears to be synonymous with the alternative titles of High King, King of Ireland, or that King of Tara. It is suggested that the explanation for this is that when Suibne Menn killed Máel Coba mac Áedo in 615, he supported Óengus's claims rather than taking power himself, or perhaps that Óengus was a deputy king in the south.

The king list in the Baile Chuind, created in late 7th century during the reign of the southern Uí Néill king Fínsnechta Fledach, apparently lists an Óengus—Glorious Óengus—as king following Suibne Menn. Another king list of Marianus Scotus includes Óengus as a high king.

His sons Máel Umai mac Óengussa and Colgu mac Óengussa were slain, as part of the southern Uí Néill feud, at the Battle of Cúil Caeláin in 635, by Diarmait mac Áedo Sláine (died 665). His grandson, Fáelchú mac Máele Umai was slain at the Battle of Ogamain in 662 fighting on the side of Conaing Cuirre mac Congaile of Cnogba and Blathmac mac Áedo Sláine (died 665) versus the adherents of Diarmait mac Áedo Sláine.

== See also ==
- Kings of Uisnech
