= Conall Laeg Breg =

King of Brega (died 612)

Conall Laeg Breg mac Áedo Sláine (died 612) was a King of Brega from the Síl nÁedo Sláine branch of the southern Ui Neill. He was the son of the high king Áed Sláine mac Diarmato (died 604). He ruled from 604 to 612. He is not called King of Brega in the annals but is second in a poem on the rulers of Síl nÁedo Sláine in the Book of Leinster.

His father had treacherously slain his nephew, Suibne mac Colmáin (died 600) of the Clann Cholmáin and was then himself slain in battle by Suibne's son Conall Guthbinn (died 635) setting off a feud among the southern Ui Neill. As part of this feud Conall Laeg Breg was slain in the Battle of Odba by Óengus mac Colmáin (died 621) of Clann Cholmáin Bicc in 612.

== See also ==
- Kings of Brega
