= Threefold death =

Indo-European mythological trope

The threefold death, which is suffered by kings, heroes, and gods, is a reconstructed Proto-Indo-European theme encountered in Indic, Greek, Celtic, and Germanic mythology.

Some proponents of the trifunctional hypothesis distinguish two types of threefold deaths in Indo-European myth and ritual. In the first type of threefold death, a person dies simultaneously in three ways; hanging (or strangulation or falling from a tree), wounding, and by drowning (or poison or burning). These three deaths are foretold, and are often punishment for an offense against the three functions of Indo-European society. The second form of the threefold death is split into three distinct parts; these distinct deaths are sacrifices to three distinct gods of the three functions.

== Literary sources ==
=== Welsh legend ===
In Welsh legend, Myrddin Wyllt (one of the sources for Merlin of Arthurian legend) is associated with threefold death. As a test of his skill, Merlin is asked to prophesy how a boy will die. He says the boy will fall from a rock. The same boy, with a change of clothes, is presented again, and Merlin prophesies that he will hang. Then, dressed in a girl's clothes, the boy is presented, and Merlin replies, "Woman or no, he will drown." As a young man, the victim falls from a rock during a hunt, is caught in a tree, and drowns hanging head down in a lake.

Myrddin Wyllt also reportedly prophesied his own death, which would happen by falling, stabbing, and drowning. This was fulfilled when a gang of jeering shepherds of King Meldred drove him off a cliff, where he was impaled on a stake left by fishermen, and died with his head below water.

=== Odin ===
The Norse god Odin is also associated with the threefold death. Human sacrifices to Odin were hanged from trees. Odin is said to have hanged himself and while falling, impaled himself on his spear Gungnir in order to learn the secrets of the runes.

=== Ibn Fadlan's account ===
The tenth-century Arab Muslim writer Ahmad ibn Fadlan produced a description of a funeral near the Volga River of a chieftain whom he identified as belonging to people he called Rūsiyyah. Scholars agree that some elements of the funeral correspond to features of funerals distinctive to the north Germanic tribes (such as burning of a ship). Ahmad ibn Fadlan describes a slave girl that, after being asked, volunteers to follow her master in death. She is prepared in many ways over several days, including being given much intoxicating drinks. She is led onboard the ship where the dead chieftain is placed. After some more rituals an old female ritual leader, referred to as the "Angel of Death", loops a rope around the slave girl's neck and while two men pulled the rope, the old woman stabbed the girl between her ribs with a knife. The ship is then set on fire with the chieftain and the slave girl on it. The slave girl is thereby strangled, stabbed, and burned; creating a threefold death.

=== Commenta Bernensia ===
One of the most prominent examples of this threefold death in three separate sacrifices comes to us from Lucan. In his epic poem, Pharsalia, which relates Julius Caesar's conquest of Gaul, he describes a set of three Celtic gods who receive human sacrifices: et quibus inmitis placatur sanguine diro/ Teutates horrensque feris altaribus Esus/ et Taranis Scythicae non mitior ara Dianae. ("To whom they appease with cruel blood, harsh Teutates, and wild, bristling Esus, and Taranis whose altar is as insatiable as that of Scythian Diana.")

One set of scholia to the Pharsalia, known as the Commenta Bernensia and dating between the 4th and 9th centuries CE, is highly important for an understanding of how these lines relate to Proto-Indo-European culture. “The later... scholiasts... elaborate on Lucan: they elicit the information that Taranis was propitiated by burning, Teutates by drowning, and Esus by means of suspending his victims from trees and ritually wounding them” This scholium is of huge significance to understanding whether this text contains evidence of the threefold death in Celtic worship. It is a distinctive detail, and it matches closely with numerous other details that relate to ritual practice in Indo-European society.

In recent years an Indo-European pattern of threefold death has been identified and discussed in terms of this tripartite ideology by a number of followers of Dumezil... The pattern is found in myths and legends of various Indo-European peoples in two main forms. The first of these is a series or grouping of three deaths, each by a different means. The second is a single death by three different means simultaneously.

David Evans goes on to cite numerous stories from various Indo-European societies. All of these stories he tells contain this theme of a tripartite death. He argues, following Dumezil, that three distinct methods of sacrifice, corresponding to the three functional deities, was an important Proto-Indo-European ritual.

=== Vita Columbae ===
There are a number of stories in Celtic mythology that clearly are formed by the Tripartite functions of Proto-Indo-European. The theme of triple-death occurs in several places in medieval Celtic sources. The first story comes from the Life of St. Columba (Vita Columbae):

Aedh, surnamed the Black, descended of a royal family, and a Cruthinian by race. Aedh wore the clerical habit, and came with the purpose of residing with him in the monastery for some years. Now this Aedh the Black had been a very bloodthirsty man, and cruelly murdered many persons, amongst others Diarmuid, son of Cerbul, by divine appointment king of all. This same Aedh, then, after spending some time in his retirement, was irregularly ordained priest by a bishop invited for the purpose... The bishop, however, would not venture to lay a hand upon his head unless Findchan, who was greatly attached to Aedh in a carnal way, should first place his right hand on his head as a mark of approval. When such an ordination afterwards became known to the saint, he was deeply grieved, and in consequence forthwith pronounced this fearful sentence on the ill-fated Findchan and Aedh... And Aedh, thus irregularly ordained, shall return as a dog to his vomit, and be again a bloody murderer, until at length, pierced in the neck with a spear, he shall fall from a tree into the water and be drowned... But Aedh the Black, a priest only in name, betaking himself again to his former evil doings, and being treacherously wounded with a spear, fell from the prow of a boat into a lake and was drowned.

This story of triple-death corresponds to the elements which Evans finds in a whole host of similar stories. In all of these stories, the tripartite death is foretold. Here St. Columba foretells the triple death of Aedh. At the same time Columba's prophecy is a curse or a punishment which he dispenses to Aedh because of his sins. This leads to the next element common in many 'Triple-death' stories, the sins of the warrior. According to Dumezil, the warrior often commits a sin against each one of the functions. He is punished for each sin, with a punishment fitting for his crime. In this passage from the Life of St. Columba, three specific sins are mentioned. Aedh blasphemes by being ordained a priest outside of the Church. This is a sin against the priestly function of Indo-European society. Aedh's second sin is murder; he has killed numerous people, most notably King Diarmuid. This is a sin against the warrior function. Aedh's last sin is against the productive/fertile function in Indo-European society, he has slept with another man—an act which is by its very nature unfertile.

The Tripartite death of Aedh is linked with another story of triple-death. Diarmuid, who is killed by Aedh, also dies a triple death:

When the king sent men to arrest Aedh, St. Ronan hid him and so Diarmuid had Ronan arrested and tried in his stead. He was condemned by the ecclasiastics for this act and Ronan himself uttered the famous curse, 'Desolate be Tara forever!' Soon after, Tara was abandoned, never to achieve its former splendor... [Diarmuid's wife] had an affair with Flann, so Diarmuid had Flann's fortress burnt over his head. Sorely wounded, Flann tried to escape the flames by crawling into a vat of water where he drowned... Bec Mac De [Diarmuid's druid councilor] prophesied that Diarmuid would be killed by Flann's kinsman, Aedh Dubh in the house of Banban... The manner of his death would be by slaughter, by burning, by drowning and by the ridge pole of a roof falling on his head... The Prophecy seemed so unlikely that Diarmuid scorned it, even when Banban invited him to a feast... Aedh Dubh was there and stabbed the High King with his spear. Wounded, Diarmuid fled back into the house. Aedh Dubh's men set fire to it. Seeking to escape the flame, Diarmuid scrambled into a vat of ale. A burning ridge pole fell on to his head. The prophecy was fulfilled (Ellis, 84).

Both of the elements which Evans discusses are present in this story of Diarmuid's death. In this story, there is a prophecy of the threefold death before it occurs. In fact, Diarmuid's death is foretold by three different men in the original story. Diarmuid has also clearly violated two of the three functions. He sins against the sanctity of the priestly function, by trying St. Ronan. For this crime Ronan curses the throne at Tara. Diarmuid also murders Flann, a violation of the warrior function. Diarmuid is punished for his transgressions by the triple nature of his death.

=== Comparative evidence ===
The Encyclopedia of Indo-European Culture cites several more examples of Indo-European myths that evidence a "conjunction of trifunctional signs and death-modes":

- In the myth of Starkad, King Vikar is hanged or strangled on the waterside, while pierced by a reed that turns into a spear.
- King Agamemnon is stabbed in his bath, while caught in a net.
- Siegfried is killed by a weapon while drinking from a spring, near a tree (so that "hanging and drowning themes remain as mere suggestions").
- Oleg of Novgorod's death, as reported in the Primary Chronicle, is a "slightly distorted" variant of the myth (see Oleg of Novgorod § Legend of the death of Oleg the Prophet).
- Sources on early Swedish kings indicate that three died, respectively, by drowning, burning and hanging (Ynglinga Saga 14, 17, 22).
- In the Aeneid, Evander reminisces about his enemy King Erulus, who had “three lives, so he could handle three sets of weapons and must be three times laid low in death.”

== Archaeology ==
Alfred Dieck claimed a high number of up to 1,860 known bog bodies in Europe. Archaeologist Don Brothwell considers that many of the older bodies need re-examining with modern techniques, such as those used in the analysis of Lindow Man. The physical evidence allows a general reconstruction of how Lindow Man was killed, although some details are debated, but it does not explain why he was killed. Archaeologists John Hodgson and Mark Brennand suggest that bog bodies may have been related to religious practice, although there is division in the academic community over this issue and in the case of Lindow Man, whether the killing was murder or ritualistic is still debated. Anne Ross, an expert on Iron Age religion, proposed that the death was an example of human sacrifice and that the "triple death" (throat cut, strangled, and hit on the head) was an offering to several different gods. The wide date range for Lindow Man's death (2 BC to 119 AD) means he may have met his demise after the Romans conquered northern England in the 60s AD. As the Romans outlawed human sacrifice, this opens up other possibilities; this was emphasised by historian Ronald Hutton, who challenged the interpretation of sacrificial death.

== See also ==
- Áed Dub mac Suibni
- Bec mac Dé
- Georges Dumézil
- Grigori Rasputin
- Halahala
- High King of Ireland
- Human sacrifice
- Lindow Man
- Lleu Llaw Gyffes
- Norse funeral
- Proto-Indo-European society
- Trifunctional hypothesis
