= Cobthach mac Gabran =

King of Ui Fiachrach Aidhne

Cobthach mac Gabran was King of Ui Fiachrach Aidhne.

Cobthach's place among the early kings is uncertain. He is listed in the genealogies but there is no explicit reference to him in the annals. His reign lies somewhere between the years after 538 and 601.

His apparent predecessor, Goibnenn mac Conaill, is given as his uncle. His apparent successor, Colmán mac Cobthaig, is given as his son. The latter was the first king of Connacht from the Ui Fiachrach Aidhne.

Preceded by Goibnenn mac Conaill?	King of Uí Fiachrach Aidhne ?	Succeeded by Colmán mac Cobthaig?
