= Battle of Tragh-Bhaile =

Battle fought in Ireland in 1399

Date	1399
Location	Dundalk, Ireland
Result	Lordship victory

Belligerents
Kingdom of Tyrone	Lordship of Ireland

Commanders and leaders
Donal MacHenry O'Neill	Unknown

The Battle of Tragh-Bhaile (Note: According to John O'Donovan's translation of the Annals of the Kingdom of Ireland, Tragh Bhaile was an "ancient name of the strand at Dundalk") was fought in Ireland in 1399 between the forces of Henry O'Neill's sons and the Anglo-Irish. The Anglo-Irish were victorious.

The O'Neill forces, led by Donal MacHenry of Tyrone, attacked the King's troops at Tragh-Bhaile (near modern-day Dundalk in County Louth), but were repulsed. Donal was captured and sent to England.

== See also ==
- Irish battles
