= Battle of Cúl Dreimhne =

Historical battle in Ireland

- Part of the expansion of the Uí Néill dynasty
Date	561 CE
Location	Cooladrummon, near Drumcliff, County Sligo
Result	Decisive Uí Néill victory

Belligerents
Laighin	Uí Néill, Connachta

Commanders and leaders
Diarmait mac Cerbaill	Fearghus and Domhnall sons of Muircheartach Mac Erc

Strength
Unknown	Unknown

Casualties and losses
3,000	1
- An early battle, so figures unreliable.

The battle of Cúl Dreimhne (also known as the Battle of the Book) took place in the 6th century in the túath of Cairbre Drom Cliabh (now County Sligo) in northwest Ireland. The exact date for the battle varies from 555 AD to 561 AD. 560 AD is regarded as the most likely by modern scholars. The battle is notable for being possibly one of the earliest conflicts over copyright in the world.

== Traditional accounts ==
Traditional accounts ascribe different reasons for this battle. The most famous is the story about the copying of a book belonging to Saint Finnian by Columcille - an account that first appears in the Life written by Manus O'Donnell, written nearly a thousand years after the alleged events supposedly took place, and therefore a highly unreliable source.

According to O'Donnell, sometime around 560, the Irish abbot and missionary Saint Columba became involved in a quarrel with Saint Finnian of Movilla Abbey over a psalter (traditionally said to be the Cathach of St. Columba). Columba copied the manuscript at the scriptorium under Saint Finnian, intending to keep the copy. Saint Finnian disputed his right to keep the copy. Thus, this dispute was about the ownership of the copy (whether it belonged to Saint Columba because he copied it or whether it belonged to Saint Finnian because he owned the original). King Diarmait mac Cerbaill gave the judgement, "To every cow belongs her calf, therefore to every book belongs its copy."

Columba disagreed with King Diarmait's ruling against him and reportedly instigated a successful rebellion of the Uí Néill clan against the King. The battle was claimed to have caused around 3,000 casualties.

Another traditional reason given for the battle concerns the violation of sanctuary. The Annals Of Tighernach for the year 559, record the death of Curnan son of Aed, son of Eochaid Tirmcharna by Diarmait mac Cerbaill, while Curnan was 'ar comairce Coluim chilli - under Colum Cille's protection'. This Curnan was the son of Aed, the king of Connacht. That Diarmait had violated the sanctuary of the termonn at the Columban monastery of Kells is given as the reason for the battle.

Either way, as a monk who had taken up arms, Colmcille faced judgement for his deeds. It said that the judgement resulted in Columba leaving his homeland for Scotland, where he founded Iona Abbey in 563. The sentence stipulated he was to win as many souls to Christianity as had been lost in the battle. The Chronicles of Iona state that "In the second year after the battle of Cul-drebene, the forty-second year of his age, Columba sailed away from Ireland to Britain wishing to be a pilgrim for Christ." This last note rather contradicts the notion that Columba had been sent away as a punishment: he was rather fulfilling a monastic vocation.

== Modern investigations ==
However, these later versions have been disputed by modern scholarship on several grounds, particularly as early mentions of the battle do not refer to the book incident. It may have been a dynastic battle between the Cinel Cairbre and Diarmait Mac cerbaill who had wrested the kingship at Tara from them after the death of Tuathal Maelgarb.
