= Fiachu mac Néill =

Fiachu mac Néill (flourished 507–514) was a king of Uisnech in Mide of the Ui Neill dynasty. He was the son of the high king Niall Noígíallach. According to the king list in the Book of Leinster, he succeeded his brother Conall Cremthainne (died 480) as king of Uisnech.

According to the Tripartite Life of Saint Patrick, Saint Patrick visited Fiachu and his brother Éndae at Uisnech. Fiachu refused baptism from the saint who put a curse on Uisnech. Tírechán gives a different account stating that Fiachu's son killed one of Patrick's followers during the visit causing Patrick to curse his descendants.

Fiachu appears as the conqueror of Meath in the annals with Failge Berraide, the ancestor of the Leinster dynasty of Uí Failgi, as his opponent. In 507 Fiachu was defeated by Failge at the Battle of Frémainn (Frewin Hill, near Mullingar, County Westmeath). Fiachu had a false prophecy that he would win this battle and desired revenge. In 514 he achieved this revenge by defeating Failge at the Battle of Druim Derg. By this victory the plain of Mide was taken away from the Laigin.

Fiachu was ancestor of the Cenél Fiachach, a clan which included several well known sub-clans or septs such as Geoghegan and O'Higgins, whose lands extended from Birr to Uisnech in southern Westmeath and part of north Offaly and their southern territory became known as Fir Cell (land of the churches), and later the Barony of Moycashel. His son Túathal established a northern branch and his son Úathnemgenn a southern branch. Another son Crimthann was great-grandfather of a local saint Áed mac Bricc (died 589).
