= Southern Uí Néill =

Gaelic-Irish dynasty

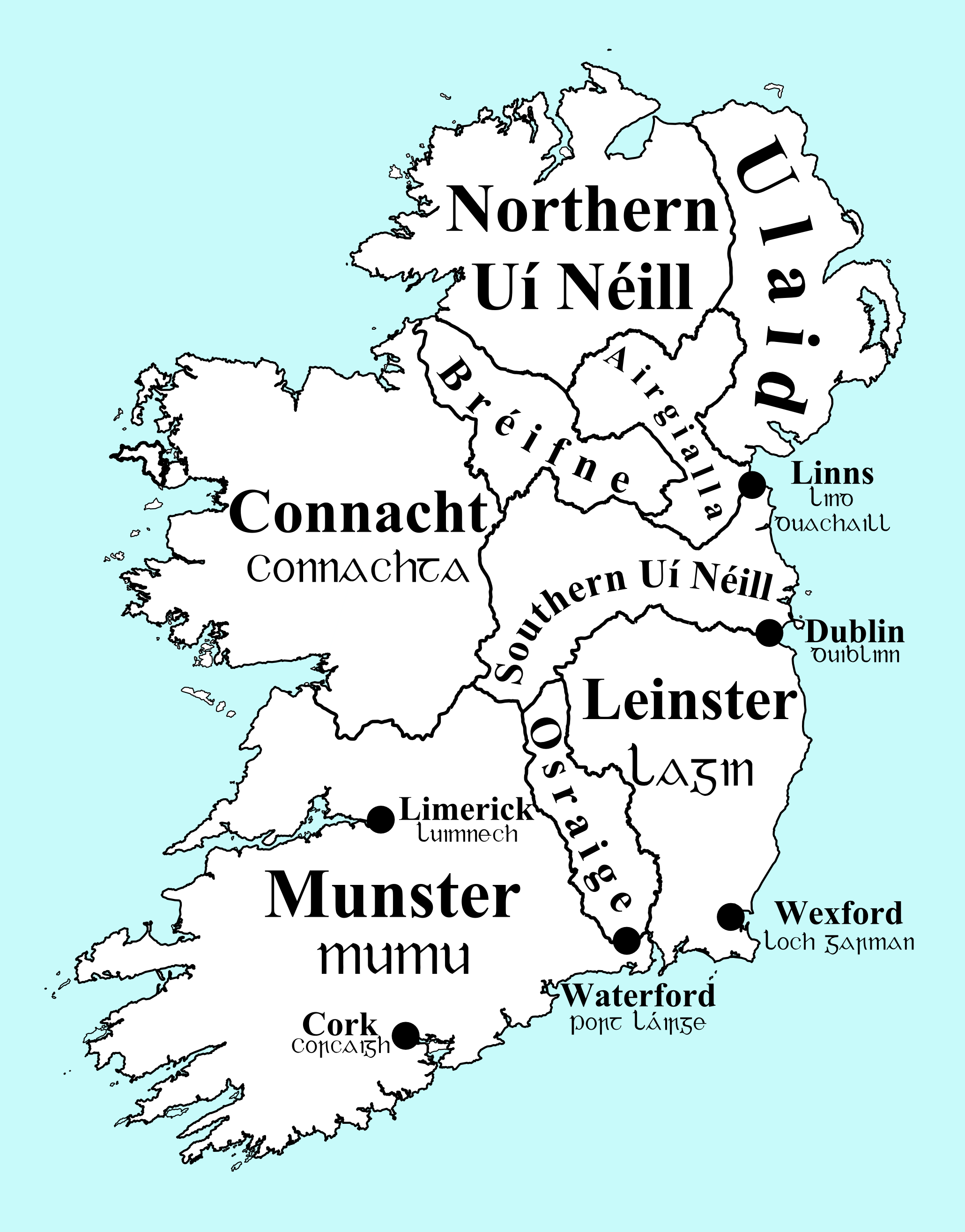
Ireland about the year 900

The Southern Uí Néill (Irish: Uí Néill an Deiscirt, [iː ˈnʲeːl̠ʲ ə ˈdʲɛʃcəɾˠtʲ]) were a branch of the Uí Néill dynasty that invaded and settled in the Kingdom of Mide and its associated kingdoms.

Two sons of Niall Noigiallach, Lóegaire (fl. c. 450) and Coirpre (fl. c. 480), initially led the dynasty, as did their immediate descendants. However, after the murder of Túathal Máelgarb in about 544, it was left to another branch of the family descended from another of Niall's sons – Conall Cremthainne – to continue Uí Néill expansion and consolidate their position. No descendants of either Lugaid mac Lóegairi or Túathal Máelgarb are recorded.

Just as their kinsmen the Northern Uí Néill split into two main branches, so too did the Southern Uí Néill, both being descended from sons of Diarmait mac Cerbaill, Colmán Már and Áed Sláine. The former was the progenitor of the Clann Cholmáin, while the latter was the eponymous ancestor of the Síl nÁedo Sláine. Clann Cholmáin ruled the kingdom of Mide, while Síl nÁedo Sláine were Kings of Brega.

According to A Dictionary of British and Irish History (2020), the "last effective high‐king of the Southern Uí Néill" was Conchobar Ua Máel Sechlainn. A member of the "Clann Cholmáin dynasty of the Uí Néill", he died c. 1073.

== Southern Uí Néill family tree ==
   Niall Noigíallach, d. 450/455?
   |                   
   |_________________________________________________________
   |                       |                |
   |                       |                |                     
   Coirpre                 Lóegaire         Conall Cremthainne  
   |                       |                |
   |                       |                | 
   Cormac Cáech            Lugaid           Fergus Cerball      
   |                       d. 507           |
   |                                        |
   Túathal Máelgarb                         Diarmait mac Cerbaill, died 565.
    died 544/549.                           |
    ________________________________________|______________________
   |                      |                             |
   |                      |                             |
   Colmán Már, d.555/8    Colmán Bec, d. 587.           Áed Sláine, d.604.
   |                                                    |
   |                                                    |
   Clann Cholmáin dynasty                               Síl nÁedo Sláine dynasty

== See also ==
- Irish kings
- Irish royal families
