= Kings of Uisnech =

The Kings of Uisnech were of the Uí Néill and one of its major southern branches, the Clann Cholmáin. The Hill of Uisnech is located in what is now County Westmeath, and was in early historic Ireland considered as the area where all five provinces met.

A list of the kings of Uisnech is found amongst the regnal lists in The Book of Leinster. The earliest kings of Uisnech were:

- Conall Cremthainne mac Néill, died 480
- Fiachu mac Néill
- Ardgal mac Conaill, died 520
- Maine mac Cerbaill, died 538
- Diarmait mac Cerbaill, died 565 (also king of Tara)
- Colmán Már mac Diarmato, died 555/558
- Colmán Bec mac Diarmato, died 587.
- Suibne mac Colmáin, died 600.
- Fergus mac Colmáin, died 618.
- Óengus mac Colmáin, died 621.
- Conall Guthbinn mac Suibni, died 635.
- Máel Dóid mac Suibni, died 653.
- Diarmait Dian mac Airmetaig Cáech, died 689.
- Murchad Midi, died 715.

== Kings of Uisnech family tree ==
 Diarmait mac Cerbaill (Fergus), died 565
 |
 |____________________________________
 |                                  |
 |                                  |
 Colmán Már, died 555/558.    Colmán Bec, died 589.
 |
 |____________________________________________
 |                     |                    |
 |                     |                    |
 Suibhne, died 600.  Fergus, died 618.  Óengus, died 621.
 |
 |___________________________________________________
 |                             |                   |
 |                             |                   | 
 Conall Guthbinn, died 635.  Colcu, died 618.  Máel Dóid, died 654
 |
 |
 Airmedach Cáech, died 637.
 |
 |____________________________________________________
 |                        |                          |
 |                        |                          |
 Sechnasach, died 681.  Diarmait Dian, died 689  Fáelchú, died 637
                          |                         also King of Mide
 _________________________|_____________
 |              |         |           |
 |              |         |           |
 Bodbchad       Áed       Colcu       Murchad Midi, died 715
 died 704   died 704  died 714   also King of the Uí Néill
                                       |
                                       |
                                       Domnall Midi, died 763
                                       King of Tara

Later kings of Uisnech included:

- Domnall Midi mac Murchada (died 763; also king of Tara)
- Niall mac Diarmata meic Airmedaig (?d. c. 768 or 826)
- Muiredach mac Domnaill Midi (died 802)
- Donnchad Midi mac Domnaill Midi (died 797; also king of Tara)
- Conchobar mac Donnchada (died 833)
- Máel Ruanaid mac Donnchada Midi (died 843)
- Máel Sechnaill mac Maíl Ruanaid (died 862; also king of Tara)
- Lorcán mac Cathail (blinded 864)
- Donnchad mac Aedacain meic Conchobair (died 877)
- Flann Sinna mac Máel Sechlainn (died 916; also king of Tara)
- Conchobar mac Flainn Sinna (died 919)
- Domnall mac Flainn Sinna (died 921)
- Donnchad Donn mac Flainn Sinna (died 944; also king of Tara)
- Óengus mac Donnchada Duinn (died 945)
- Donnchad mac Domnaill meic Flainn Sinna (died 950)
- Fergal mac Óengusa (d. c. 950)
- Áed mac Máele Ruanaid meic Flainn Sinna (died 951)
- Domnall mac Donnchada Duinn (died 952)
- Carlus mac Cuinn meicc Donnchada Duinn (died 960)
- Muirchertach [likely son of Congalach Cnogba mac Máele Mithig of Brega (died 964)]
- Máel Sechnaill Mór mac Domnaill meic Donnchada Duinn (died 1022; also king of Tara)
- Máel Sechnaill Got mac Máel Sechlainn meic Cináeda meic Domnaill meic Flainn Sinna (died 1025)
- Róen mac Muirchertaig meic Máel Sechlainn meic Máele Ruanaid meic Conchobair meic Flainn Sinna (died 1027)
- Domnall Got (died 1030)
- Conchobar mac Flainn [? or should be Conchobar mac Domnaill meic Máel Sechlainn Móir (died 1073)]
- Murchad mac Flainn mac Domnaill meic Máel Sechlainn Móir (died 1076)
- Máel Sechnaill Bán mac Conchobair meic Domnaill (died 1087)
- Domnall mac Flainn mac Domnaill meic Máel Sechlainn Móir (died 1094)
- Conchobar mac Máel Sechlainn Báin (died 1105)
- Donnchad mac Murchada mac Flainn (deposed 1105; died 1106)
- Máel Sechnaill mac Donnchada meic Murchada (died 1115?) and Murchad mac Donnchada meic Murchada
