= Túathal Máelgarb =

High King of Ireland (died 544)

Túathal mac Cormaic (died 544), called Túathal Máelgarb, (Túathal: "ruler of the people") was said to be a grandson of Coirpre mac Néill. He was High King of Ireland. In the earliest accounts he appears to have been regarded as the man who completed the conquest of what would later be Brega for the descendants of Niall of the Nine Hostages.

While later genealogies make Túathal the son of Cormac Cáech, son of Coirpre, son of Niall of the Nine Hostages, this is at odds with the account of the 7th century life of Saint Patrick by Tírechán, which claims that Patrick cursed Coirpre and his descendants so that none would ever be king of Tara. Later hagiographies accounted for this discrepancy by having Túathal excluded from Patrick's curse.

There is only a single significant entry in the Irish annals concerning Túathal. This is a report of his victory in a battle against the Ciannacht "at Luachair between the two estuaries", perhaps in 535. Luachair is a common place name, and it is uncertain which two rivers are concerned. This victory is believed to have established the dominance of Niall's descendants over the Ciannacht and over the plain of Brega. While these entries in the Irish annals are not based on a contemporary record, the language used suggests that they are very early, perhaps dating from the end of the 6th century.

Túathal is reported to have been killed in the 540s or according to the Annals of the Four Masters in 538. Later glosses to the annals, and tales concerning Diarmait mac Cerbaill and Saint Ciarán of Clonmacnoise, add more detail, but are likely to be much later traditions. According to these, Túathal was attempting to have Diarmait banished, but instead Túathal was killed by Diarmait's uterine half-brother—according to some versions, his adoptive kinsman—"Máelmor Ua Machí" or "Máelmor mac Argadaín". Máelmor himself was killed on the spot.
