= Suibne mac Colmáin =

King of Uisnech

Suibne mac Colmáin (died 600) was a King of Uisnech in Mide of the Clann Cholmáin. He was the son of Colmán Már mac Diarmato (died 555/558), also King of Uisnech. He ruled Uisnech from 587 to 600.

The Marianus Scotus king list names Suibne mac Colmáin as High King of Ireland. He may also be the Suibne referred to in the Baile Chuind (The Ecstasy of Conn) The annals and other king lists do not give him this title, however. He was slain in 600 at Brí Dam on the Suaine (near modern Geashill, County Offaly) by his uncle, the high king Áed Sláine mac Diarmato (died 604) of the Síl nÁedo Sláine, treacherously according to the Life of St. Columba by Adomnán.

Suibne's sons Conall Guthbinn mac Suibni (died 635) and Máel Dóid mac Suibni (died 653) were also kings of Uisnech. His daughter Uasal ingen Suibni (died 643) married Fáelán mac Colmáin (died 666?), King of Leinster from the Uí Dúnlainge.

== See also ==
- Kings of Uisnech
