= Hugh Geoghegan (footballer) =

Irish footballer

Hugh Geoghegan is an Irish former footballer who played as a forward.

== Career ==
Geoghegan began his career at Home Farm and signed for Shamrock Rovers in 1956 and played in two European Champion Clubs' Cup games against Nice.

He made his debut, scoring twice, on 28 October 1956 in a League of Ireland Shield game.

Signed for Waterford United in July 1960.

Moved to Jacobs in February 1963.

== Sources ==
- Paul Doolan; Robert Goggins. The Hoops. ISBN 0-7171-2121-6.
