= Colmán Már mac Diarmato =

Colmán Már mac Diarmato (died 555/558) was an Irish king, son of Diarmait mac Cerbaill. Early sources and older scholarship distinguish two sons of Diarmait, Colmán Már (Colmán the Elder) and Colmán Bec (Colmán the Younger), although some scholars suggest there was only one Colmán mac Diarmato. There are some traces of Colmán Bec in the Irish annals, but so far as Colmán Már is concerned only his putative death is recorded.

According to the traditional account, found in genealogical sources, Diarmait mac Cerbaill had three known sons, two of whom were called Colmán. Colmán Bec's mother is said to have been Brea daughter of the Conmaicne, a Connacht people. Colmán Már's mother, Eithne, daughter of Brénainn Dall of the Conmaicne. Other sources claim that Eithne was also a wife of Diarmait's son Áed Sláine, and yet others say that she also married Áed's son Blathmac.

Both Colmáns were regarded as the founders of later dynasties. Colmán Már, to whom the genealogists gave two sons, Suibne and Fergus, was the eponymous ancestor of Clann Cholmáin, a dynasty which dominated the southern Uí Néill from the 8th century to the early 11th century, and which supplied many kings of Tara. Colmán Bec was regarded as the ancestor of the much less important dynasty of Clann Cholmáin Bic, later Caille Follamain, through a son Óengus.

The only record of Colmán Már in the annals is a report of his death in the 550s. A number of difficulties have been noted with the chronology of Colmán Már's death in relation to the floruit of his supposed sons and brothers, with the early appearance of his Latinate name, and with the record of the annals. Ailbhe Mac Shamhráin concludes "...Colmán Már is a hollow figure and looks suspiciously like an artificial creation...". It is suggested that Colmán Már was added to the genealogies in the time of Domnall Midi (died 763).

The first record of Colmán Bec in the annals is in the 560s, when he is reported to have undertaken an expedition to Iardoman—glossed as "Seil and Islay", but sometimes understood to mean the Inner Hebrides more generally—along with Conall mac Comgaill.

In the 570s, the annals record Colmán Bec's defeat at a battle at Femen. Some sources add that he was defeated by Coirpre Cromm mac Crimthainn, who is recorded as the provincial overking of Munster. There were at least two notable places named Femen, one near to the Hill of Tara, the other near to Cashel. Some historians have supposed that this battle in fact concerned internal Uí Néill disputes.

Colmán Bec's final appearances in the historical record are in the 580s, perhaps 586 and 587. In 586, the annals report the killing of Báetán mac Ninneda, whom they claim to have been king of Tara, "according to Colmán Bec's plan" by Colmán's son Cumméne and a kinsman of the same name, a grandson of Diarmait's brother Illand. The following year there is a report of Colmán Bec's death, fighting against Áed mac Ainmuirech, at the unlocated Belach Dathí.

== See also ==
- Kings of Uisnech

== Bibliography ==
- Annals of Tigernach at CELT: Corpus of Electronic Texts at University College Cork
- Annals of Ulster at CELT: Corpus of Electronic Texts at University College Cork
- Annals of the Four Masters at CELT: Corpus of Electronic Texts at University College Cork
- Annals of Innisfallen at CELT: Corpus of Electronic Texts at University College Cork
- Byrne, Francis J. (2001), Irish Kings and High-Kings (2nd ed.), Dublin: Four Courts Press, ISBN 978-1-85182-196-9
- Connon, Anne, "Prosopography II: A Prosopography of the Early Queens of Tara", in Bhreathnach, Edel (ed.), The Kingship and Landscape of Tara, Dublin: Four Courts Press, pp. 225–327, ISBN 1-85182-954-7
- Charles-Edwards, T. M. (2000), Early Christian Ireland, Cambridge: Cambridge University Press, ISBN 0-521-36395-0
- Connon, Anne, "Prosopography II: A Prosopography of the Early Queens of Tara", in Bhreathnach, Edel (ed.), The Kingship and Landscape of Tara, Dublin: Four Courts Press, pp. 159–224, ISBN 1-85182-954-7
- Mac Shamhráin, Ailbhe (2000), "Nebulae discutiuntur? The emergence of Clann Cholmáin sixth-eighth centuries", in Smyth, Alfred P. (ed.), Seanchas: Studies in Early and Medieval Irish Archaeology, History and Literature in Honour of Francis J. Byrne, Dublin: Four Courts Press, pp. 83–97, ISBN 1-85182-489-8
- Mac Shamhráin, Ailbhe; Byrne, Paul, "Prosopography I: Kings named in Baile Chuinn Chétchathaig and the Airgíalla Charter Poem", in Bhreathnach, Edel (ed.), The Kingship and Landscape of Tara, Dublin: Four Courts Press, pp. 225–327, ISBN 1-85182-954-7
- Book of Leinster,Rig Uisnig at CELT: Corpus of Electronic Texts at University College Cork
- Laud Synchronisms at CELT: Corpus of Electronic Texts at University College Cork
