= Diarmait mac Cerbaill =

6th century High King of Ireland

- High King of Ireland
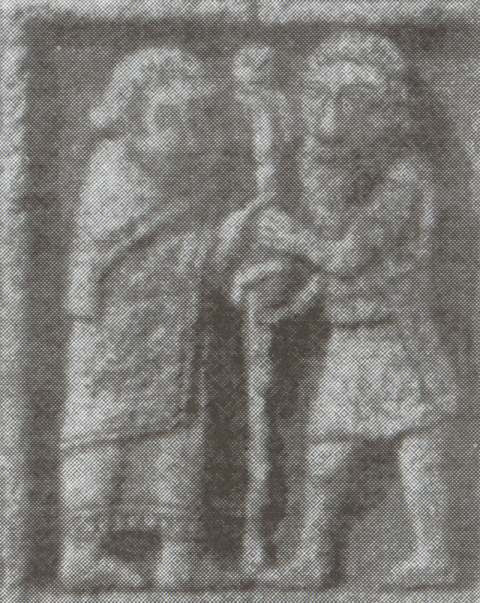
- Scene from the east face of the Cross of the Scriptures, Clonmacnoise. The figures probably represent Saint Ciarán and Diarmait mac Cerbaill founding Clonmacnoise: "Then Ciarán planted the first stake, and Diarmait son of Cerball was along with him. Said Ciarán to Diarmait when setting the stake, 'Let, O warrior, thy hand be over my hand, and thou shalt be in sovranty over the men of Ireland.'"
- Reign: 539–558
- Predecessor: Túathal Máelgarb
- Successor: Domnall Ilchelgach and Fearghus
- Died: 565
- House: Uí Néill – Cenél Conaill

Diarmait mac Cerbaill (died c. 565) was King of Tara or High King of Ireland. According to traditions, he was the last High King to follow the pagan rituals of inauguration, the ban-feis or marriage to goddess of the land. The last High King to observe the ancient pagan Feis Temrach or Assembly of Tara which took place on Samhain every three years to pass or renew laws, approve annals and records.

While many later stories were attached to Diarmait, he was a historical ruler and his descendants were of great significance in Medieval Ireland.

== Sources ==
It is believed that the earliest of the Irish annals which came to make up the lost Chronicle of Ireland were kept as a contemporary record from no later than the middle of the 7th century, and may be rather older as it has been argued that many late 6th century entries have the appearance of contemporary recording. There is general agreement that the annals are largely based, in their earliest contemporary records, on a chronicle kept at the monastery on Iona, and that the recording moved to somewhere in the midlands of Ireland only around 740. Although it is thus possible that the records of Diarmait's times in the annals are nearly contemporary, the later history of the annals is complex and much debated, so that it is uncertain to what extent surviving late annals such as the Annals of Ulster and Annals of Tigernach faithfully reproduce the earlier records.

Diarmait mac Cerbaill was the last to hold the sacral kingship of Tara. He has also some title to be ranked as the first Christian high-king of Ireland. Two of his sons bore the specifically Christian name of Colmán, deriving from the Latin Columbanus. This ambivalent character, together with the fact that he was the direct ancestor of the two most powerful dynasties of the Southern Uí Néill, made him an obvious figure for saga and legend.

== Descendants of Niall ==
Diarmait was the son of Fergus Cerrbél, son of Conall Cremthainne, son of Niall of the Nine Hostages. Yet of Niall's own historicity there is little reason to doubt. His descendants quarrelled incessantly among themselves after the manner of most Irish dynastic families and had no cause to invent a common ancestry, since by unanimous testimony the high-kingship of Tara prior to Niall's days had not been the preserve of any one tribe or family. By the end of the fifth century, however, it was well on the way to becoming so. Niall's sons and grandsons proclaimed their intention of monopolising it to the exclusion of their western cousins by discarding the tribal appellation of Connachta and adopting the dynastic name Uí Néill, nepotes Néill. As a great-grandson of Niall, Diarmait and his descendants were counted among the Uí Néill, the name meaning "descendants of Niall".

The two great Southern Uí Néill dynasties of the midlands were the Síl nÁedo Sláine (the Seed of Áedo of Slane), kings of Brega in the east, and the Clann Cholmáin Máir (the Children of Colmán the Great) in Mide with their centre in the heart of modern Westmeath. The former are more prominent in the seventh century, but after the death of Cináed mac Írgalaig in 728 all the high-kings of the Southern Uí Néill come from the Clann Cholmáin except for a brief period between 944 and 956 when the king of Knowth, Congalach Cnogba, restored the high-kingship to the Brega line.

It is remarkable that the Síl nÁedo Sláine and Clann Cholmáin derive their origin, not directly from Niall Noígiallach, but from his great-grandson Diarmait mac Cerbaill. The annals date Diarmait's reign as high-king from about 544 to 565. The petty Uí Néill kings of Cenél nArdgail traced their ancestry to an uncle of Diarmait's, but never won the high kingship. Besides Colmáin Már and Áed Sláine, Diarmait had a third son Colmáin Bec, whose descendants, the dynasty of Caílle Follamain, ruled an area corresponding to the baronies of Fore, between Mide and Brega.

Diarmait's immediate origins are obscure and may arouse some suspicion. In spite of his patronymic (Latinised by Adomnán as filius Cerbulis) the genealogical tradition says that his father's name was Fergus, nicknamed Cerrbél or 'crooked mouth.' His grandfather Conall son of Niall was nicknamed Cremthainne (possibly denoting fosterage among the Uí Chremthainn of Airgialla), to distinguish him from his brother Conall Gulban, ancestor of the Cenél Conaill. The habit of giving the same name to different sons remained common among the prolific Irish princes until the sixteenth century.

== Reign ==
The Annals of Tigernach record that Diarmait celebrated the Feast of Tara, his inauguration as King, in 558 or 560. The previous King of Tara, according to the earliest lists, was Óengarb, an epithet meaning "extremely rough", presumed to refer to Diarmait's kinsman Tuathal Maelgarb. What followed the inauguration was "a surprisingly unpropitious reign for so famous a king".

Diarmait was defeated at the battle of Cúl Dreimne (near Ben Bulben in modern County Sligo) in 560 or 561. This was the "Battle of the Books," supposedly the result of Diarmait's judgement in a dispute between Columba and Finnian of Moville. Columba, it is said, had secretly copied a book belonging to Finnian, and the matter of ownership of the copy had come to be settled by Diarmait, who adjudged in Finnian's favour, reportedly saying "[t]o every cow its calf and to every book its copy." Columba sought support from his kinsmen among the Cenél Conaill and the Cenél nEógain of the northern Uí Néill who went to war with Diarmait. This is a late tradition, and annalistic accounts claim that the battle was fought over Diarmait's killing of Diarmait of Curnán, son of Áed mac Echach (d.575), the King of Connacht who was under Columba's protection.

Following this defeat, Diarmait lost the battle of Cúil Uinsen to Áed mac Brénainn, king of Tethbae in Leinster. Diarmait played no part in the great Uí Néill victory over the Cruthin at Móin Daire Lothair in 563. He was killed in 565, probably at Ráith Bec in Mag Line (Moylinny, near Larne) in Ulster by Áed Dub mac Suibni, king of the Cruthin.

According to the later Irish historians, Diarmait was followed as King of Tara by Domnall Ilchegalch and Forguss, sons of Muirchertach mac Ercae, of the Cenél nEógain. More contemporary sources suggest that the Kingship of Tara all but disappeared in the years following Diarmait's death, and that it was not until the time of Domnall mac Áedo, or perhaps of Fiachnae mac Báetáin, that there was a High King of Ireland again.

== Saints and Druids ==
Adomnán of Iona, writing less than 150 years after Diarmait's death, describes him as "ordained by God's will as king of all Ireland." Given that the annals say that Diarmait celebrated the Feast of Tara, the pagan inauguration ceremony, Adomnán's words represent his view of kingship rather than the reality of Diarmait's life. Most traditions portray Diarmait as in conflict with saints and holy men, notably Columba. A later poet has Diarmait say "Woe to him that contends with the clergy of the churches."

A poem, Mairg thochras fri cléirchib cell ("Woe to him who contends with the clergy of the churches") in the Book of Leinster, is ascribed to Diarmait.

== Prophetic Death of Diarmait ==
Supernatural features in Diarmait's reign are not limited to prose and verse works or to lives of saints. Even the Irish annals include a reference to druid fences being created at the battle of Cúl Dreimne. The main subject for later writers and poets however, was not Diarmait's life but his death.

Diarmait is told by Bec mac Dé that Áed Dub, Diarmait's foster-son, will be his killer. Accordingly, Diarmait banishes Áed Dub. Saint Ruadán gives the prophecy that Diarmait will be killed by the roof-beam of his hall at Tara. Diarmait has the beam cast into the sea. Diarmait then asks his druids to find the manner of his death, and they foretell that he will die a threefold death, by slaughter, drowning and burning (or again: "by iron, water and fire"), and that the signs of his death will be a shirt grown from a single seed of flax, a mantle made of wool from a single sheep, ale brewed from one seed of corn, and bacon from a sow which has never farrowed.

On a circuit of Ireland, Diarmait comes to the hall of Banbán at Ráith Bec, and there the fate of which he was warned comes to pass. Diarmuid dies a triple death: the roof beam of Tara has been recovered from the sea by Banbán and set in his hall, the shirt and mantle and ale and bacon are duly produced for Diarmait. Diarmait goes to leave Banbán's hall, but Áed Dub, waiting at the door, strikes him down and sets fire to the hall. Diarmait crawls into an ale vat to escape the flames and is duly killed by the falling roof beam. Thus, all the prophecies are fulfilled.

When the king sent men to arrest Aedh, St. Ronan hid him and so Diarmuid had Ronan arrested and tried in his stead. He was condemned by the ecclasiastics for this act and Ronan himself uttered the famous curse, 'Desolate be Tara forever!' Soon after, Tara was abandoned, never to achieve its former splendor... [Diarmuid's wife] had an affair with Flann, so Diarmuid had Flann's fortress burnt over his head. Sorely wounded, Flann tried to escape the flames by crawling into a vat of water where he drowned... Bec Mac De [Diarmuid's druid councilor] prophesied that Diarmuid would be killed by Flann's kinsman, Aedh Dubh in the house of Banban... The manner of his death would be by slaughter, by burning, by drowning and by the ridge pole of a roof falling on his head... The Prophecy seemed so unlikely that Diarmuid scorned it, even when Banban invited him to a feast... Aedh Dubh was there and stabbed the High King with his spear. Wounded, Diarmuid fled back into the house. Aedh Dubh's men set fire to it. Seeking to escape the flame, Diarmuid scrambled into a vat of ale. A burning ridge pole fell on to his head. The prophecy was fulfilled (Ellis, 84).

Both of the elements which Evans discusses are present in this story of Diarmuid's death. In this story, there is a prophecy of the threefold death before it occurs. In fact, Diarmuid's death is foretold by three different men in the original story. Diarmuid has also clearly violated two of the three functions. He sins against the sanctity of the priestly function, by trying St. Ronan. For this crime Ronan curses the throne at Tara. Diarmuid also murders Flann, a violation of the warrior function. Diarmuid is punished for his transgressions by the triple nature of his death.

Like tales are told of Muirchertach mac Ercae and Adomnán records that Columba prophesied a similar death, by wounding, falling and drowning, for Áed Dub. There are a number of stories in Celtic mythology that clearly are formed by the Tripartite functions of Proto-Indo-European. The theme of triple-death occurs in several places in medieval Celtic sources. The Tripartite death of Aedh is linked with another story of triple-death, which comes from the Life of St. Columba (Vita Columbae):

Aedh, surnamed the Black, descended of a royal family, and a Cruthinian by race. Aedh wore the clerical habit, and came with the purpose of residing with him in the monastery for some years. Now this Aedh the Black had been a very bloodthirsty man, and cruelly murdered many persons, amongst others Diarmuid, son of Cerbul, by divine appointment king of all. This same Aedh, then, after spending some time in his retirement, was irregularly ordained priest by a bishop invited for the purpose... The bishop, however, would not venture to lay a hand upon his head unless Findchan, who was greatly attached to Aedh in a carnal way, should first place his right hand on his head as a mark of approval. When such an ordination afterwards became known to the saint, he was deeply grieved, and in consequence forthwith pronounced this fearful sentence on the ill-fated Findchan and Aedh... And Aedh, thus irregularly ordained, shall return as a dog to his vomit, and be again a bloody murderer, until at length, pierced in the neck with a spear, he shall fall from a tree into the water and be drowned... But Aedh the Black, a priest only in name, betaking himself again to his former evil doings, and being treacherously wounded with a spear, fell from the prow of a boat into a lake and was drowned.

This story of triple-death corresponds to the elements which Evans finds in a whole host of similar stories. In all of these stories, the tripartite death is foretold. Here St. Columba foretells the triple death of Aedh. At the same time Columba's prophecy is a curse or a punishment which he dispenses to Aedh because of his sins. This leads to the next element common in many 'Triple-death' stories, the sins of the warrior. According to Dumezil, the warrior often commits a sin against each one of the functions. He is punished for each sin, with a punishment fitting for his crime. In this passage from the Life of St. Columba, three specific sins are mentioned. Aedh blasphemes by being ordained a priest outside of the Church. This is a sin against the priestly function of Indo-European society. Aedh's second sin is murder; he has killed numerous people, most notably King Diarmuid. This is a sin against the warrior function. Aedh's last sin is against the productive/fertile function in Indo-European society, he has slept with another man—an act which is by its very nature unfertile. This is again the mythic three-fold death, and probably signifies that there was some manner of traditional account of Áed Dub. From Adomnán's account it can be surmised that Áed was deposed, or abdicated, and spent time in Britain in a monastery before, presumably, returning to Ulster to try to regain his throne. The report of Áed Dub's death in the Annals of Ulster for 588 — the Annals of Tigernach place it in 579 — may contain some traces of this as it reports the killing of Áed aboard a ship. This is thought to have taken place on Lough Neagh.

== Descendants ==
- Síl nÁedo Sláine from Áed Sláine
- Clann Cholmáin from Colmán Már
- Caílle Follamain from Colmán Bec

== Bibliography ==
- Bhreathnach, Edel (2005), "Níell cáich úa Néill nasctar géill: The Political Context of Baile Chuinn Chétchathaig", in Bhreathnach, Edel (ed.), The Kingship and Landscape of Tara, Dublin: Four Courts Press, pp. 49–68, ISBN 1-85182-954-7
- Byrne, Francis John (2001), Irish Kings and High-Kings (2nd ed.), Dublin: Four Courts Press, ISBN 1-85182-196-1
- Byrne, Paul (2005), "Diarmait mac Cerbaill", in Duffy, Seán (ed.), Medieval Ireland: An Encyclopedia, New York: Routledge, pp. 125–127, ISBN 0-415-94052-4
- Charles-Edwards, T. M. (2006), The Chronicle of Ireland, Translated Texts for Historians, vol. 44, Liverpool: Liverpool University Press, ISBN 0-85323-959-2
- Charles-Edwards, T. M. (2004), "Diarmait mac Cerbaill (d. 565)", Oxford Dictionary of National Biography, Oxford: Oxford University Press
- Charles-Edwards, T. M. (2000), Early Christian Ireland, Cambridge: Cambridge University Press, ISBN 0-521-36395-0
- Connon, Anne (2005), "Prosopography II: A Prosopography of the Early Queens of Tara", in Bhreathnach, Edel (ed.), The Kingship and Landscape of Tara, Dublin: Four Courts Press, pp. 225–327, ISBN 1-85182-954-7
- De Paor, Liam (1997), Ireland and Early Europe: Essays and Occasional Writings on Art and Culture, Dublin: Four Courts Press, ISBN 1-85182-298-4
- Hughes, Kathleen (2005), "The church in Irish society, 400–800", in Ó Cróinín, Dáibhí (ed.), Prehistoric and Early Ireland, A New History of Ireland, vol. I, Oxford: Oxford University Press, pp. 301–330, ISBN 0-19-922665-2
- Lacey, Brian (2006), Cenél Conaill and the Donegal Kingdoms AD 500–800, Dublin: Four Courts Press, ISBN 1-85182-978-4
- MacKillop, James (1998), The Oxford Dictionary of Celtic Mythology, Oxford: Oxford University Press, ISBN 0-19-860967-1
- Mac Niocaill, Gearóid (1972), Ireland before the Vikings, The Gill History of Ireland, vol. 1, Dublin: Gill and Macmillan, ISBN 0-7171-0558-X
- Mac Shamhráin, Ailbhe; Byrne, Paul (2005), "Prosopography I: Kings named in Baile Chuinn Chétchathaig and the Airgíalla Charter Poem", in Bhreathnach, Edel (ed.), The Kingship and Landscape of Tara, Dublin: Four Courts Press, pp. 159–224, ISBN 1-85182-954-7
- Mac Shamhráin, Ailbhe (2000), "Nebulae discutiuntur? The emergence of Clann Cholmáin, sixth–eighth centuries", in Smyth, Alfred P. (ed.), Seanchas. Studies in Early and Medieval Irish Archaeology, History and Literature in Honour of Francis J. Byrne, Dublin: Four Courts Press, pp. 83–97, ISBN 1-85182-489-8
- Ó Cróinín, Dáibhí (1995), Early Medieval Ireland: 400–1200, London: Longman, ISBN 0-582-01565-0
- Ó Cróinín, Dáibhí (2005), "Ireland 400–800", in Ó Cróinín, Dáibhí (ed.), Prehistoric and Early Ireland, A New History of Ireland, vol. I, Oxford: Oxford University Press, pp. 182–234, ISBN 0-19-922665-2
- Sharpe, Richard (1995), Adomnán of Iona: Life of St Columba, Harmondsworth: Penguin, ISBN 0-14-044462-9
- Stokes, Whitley (1890), Lives of saints, from the Book of Lismore, Oxford: Clarendon Press
- Wiley, Dan M. (2005), "Aideda", in Duffy, Seán (ed.), Medieval Ireland: An Encyclopedia, New York: Routledge, pp. 10–11, ISBN 0-415-94052-4
- Wiley, Dan M. (2004), "Aided Díarmata meic Cerbaill (Book of Uí Maine)", The Cycles of the Kings, archived from the original on 2 September 2006
- Wiley, Dan M. (2004), "Aided Díarmata meic Cerbaill (Book of Lismore)", The Cycles of the Kings, archived from the original on 2 September 2006
- Wiley, Dan M. (2004), "Comlond Díarmata meic Cerbaill fri Rúadán", The Cycles of the Kings, archived from the original on 2 September 2006
- Wiley, Dan M. (2004), "Orgguin Trí Mac Díarmata mic Cerbaill", The Cycles of the Kings, archived from the original on 2 September 2006
