= Goibnenn mac Conaill =

Goibnenn mac Conaill (flourished 537) was the first king of the Ui Fiachrach Aidhne mentioned in the annals. He was the great-grandson of the high king Nath Í (died 445).

In 537 he defeated the King of Uisnech, Maine mac Cerbaill, of the Southern Ui Neill at the Battle of Claenloch (near Kinelea, Co. Galway) and Maine was slain. Maine was attempting to secure the hostages of the Uí Maine. This battle marked the division of the Ui Maine subject to Connacht and the Cenél Maine of Tethba, subject to the Southern Ui Neill. This victory would lead to the domination of the kingship of Connacht by the Ui Fiachrach Aidne in the 7th century.

== Notes ==
Regnal titles
New title	King of Uí Fiachrach Aidhne fl. 538	Succeeded by Cobthach mac Gabran?
