= Roche MacGeoghegan =

Irish Dominican prelate and Tridentine reformist

- Bishop of Kildare
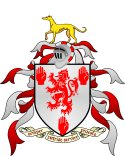
- Geoghegan Family Coat of Arms
- Church: Roman Catholic Church
- See: Diocese of Kildare
- In office: 1628/9 – 1644
- Predecessor: Donatus Doolin
- Successor: James Dempsey

Personal details
- Born: 1580 Probably County Westmeath
- Died: 26 May 1644 (aged 63–64) Probably County Westmeath

Roche MacGeoghegan (1580 – 26 May 1644), also known as Roque de la Cruz, was a seventeenth-century Irish Dominican prelate and Tridentine reformist. A member of an aristocratic family from County Westmeath, he obtained a mostly Roman Catholic childhood education before, in his twenties, moving to Iberia and entering the Dominican Order. After many years promoting the revitalisation of the Order in Ireland, from Ireland and Continental Europe, he was considered unsuccessfully for the archbishopric of Armagh in 1625 and then successfully for the bishopric of Kildare in 1629, gaining himself the title of Ross, al Roche, D.D., Bishop of Kildare. After a dozen years as bishop, his health slowly declined and he died in 1644. His nephew was historian and translator Conall MacGeoghegan.

== Origins and background ==
Born in 1580, Roche was the sixth son of Giles (Giles) "Sheila" O'Dempsey (1561-1619) and Ross MacGeoghegan (1549-1580), chief of the MacGeoghegan kindred of Moycashel, County Westmeath. His family had a background of involvement in the Irish Counter-Reformation. Later, two of his cousins became Dominican friars, and another cousin, Anthony MacGeoghegan, became the Roman Catholic Bishop of Clonmacnoise.

Despite being educated in a Protestant school for 6 months, the bulk of MacGeoghegan's early education was in the hands of Catholics, men such as the Westmeath priest John Power, as well as Catholic laymen in Westmeath and County Tipperary. He travelled to Lisbon in 1600 and joined the Dominican Order, acquiring the name Roque de la Cruz. At the Irish College in Lisbon he spent many months learning the Humanities, before he moved to Salamanca in 1601 .

== The Dominican ==
MacGeoghegan spent 8 years at Salamanca, during many of which he lectured to students from Ireland. From 1614 onwards he was active in Ireland in the service of his Order, promoting and reorganising the Dominicans on the island, who had declined almost to oblivion in the previous century. He served as Vicar of the Dominican Order in Ireland between 1614 and 1617. The revitalisation of the Order played an important part in the Irish counter-Reformation, and MacGeoghegan's leadership in this task required grants from the Pope to read banned texts, to grant marriage dispensation and to celebrate the sacraments anywhere on the island.

For his preaching and organisational efforts he achieved recognition in Continental Europe, for instance when he attended the Dominican chapter meeting at Lisbon in 1618. he was awarded the decree of praesentatus. While at this chapter meeting, MacGeoghegan presented his plans for the recovery of the Dominicans in Ireland, a plan that was accepted by the Order. All Irish Dominicans in Continental Europe were instructed to return to Ireland after completion of their training, and MacGeoghegan was empowered to recall Irish Dominicans who had not returned after their training.

== The Bishop ==
MacGeoghegan continued in such a manner for the following decade. After the death of Peter Lombard, Archbishop of Armagh, MacGeoghegan emerged as one of the leading candidates to be Lombard's successor. The Dominican Order pressurised the papacy for his appointment, keen to secure one of their Order in such a position to compete with the Franciscans, who held a number of Irish sees. He was also supported by Philip II, King of Castile. However, mainly due to the opposition of the Earl of Tyrone and the Earl of Tyrconnell, who were opposed to someone from the Pale becoming the archbishop in Ulster, his candidacy failed and a Franciscan, Hugh MacCaghwell, succeeded instead. He was compelled to go into exile after briefly falling foul of government authorities, fleeing to Leuven (Louvain), Flanders, in 1626.

At Leuven, MacGeoghegan remained active, successfully lobbying King Philip II for the foundation of a Dominican college in that city. In 1628, the prospect of a more modest episcopal post closer to his homeland came up. On 5 May 1628, he was unsuccessfully provided to the bishopric of Kildare. This provision was repeated on 12 February 1629, this time successfully, and MacGeoghegan returned to Ireland as bishop. The new Bishop of Kildare was highly active during his early years and was known for his piety and discipline, wearing chains and a hair-shirt under his clothes. He actively carried out visitations and other episcopal duties, held diocesan synods and attended a provincial synod in 1640.

== Death ==
Two traditions exist about his death exist. A traditional story is that while preaching a sermon in praise of Francis of Assisi, he was overcome with paralysis and died immediately. Contemporary official records however reveal that in the 1640s Bishop MacGeoghegan's health declined and that he became paralysed, remaining is such a condition for an extended period before his death. In the event, he died on 26 May 1644, perhaps in County Westmeath. His place of burial is not known for certain, but it was likely at either Multyfarnham Franciscan friary, the traditional burial place for his family, or at the Catholic Church of Kildare. He left an extensive library which, after his death, was divided between his diocese and the Dominican Order.

== See also ==
- Dominicans in Ireland

== Notes ==
Religious titles
Preceded by Donatus Doolin	Bishop of Kildare; 1628/9 – 1644	Succeeded by James Dempsey
