= Gahagan =

Gahagan is a surname of which is derived from Geoghegan. Notable people with the surname include:

- Dennis Gahagan (c. 1817–?), early settler in San Diego, California
- Helen Gahagan Douglas (1900–1980), American actress and politician
- James Gahagan (1927–1999), American painter
- John Gahagan (born 1958), Scottish footballer
- Lawrence Gahagan (d.1820), Irish-born sculptor
- Sebastian Gahagan (1779–1838), Irish-born sculptor

== See also ==
- Gahagan Mounds Site, a Caddoan Mississippian culture mound site in Red River Parish, Louisiana, US
- Geoghegan, the surname which Gahagan derives from
