= Áed Dub mac Suibni =

King of Ulster
- Reign: 581 – 588
- Predecessor: Báetán mac Cairill
- Successor: Fiachnae mac Báetáin

King of Dál nAraidi
- Reign: –588
- Predecessor: Báetán mac Echach
- Successor: Fiachnae mac Báetáin
- Died: c. 588
- House: Dál nAraidi (Ulaid)
- Religion: Christian

Áed Dub mac Suibni (died c. 588) was an Irish king of the Dál nAraidi in the over-kingdom of Ulaid (in modern Ulster). He may have been king of the Ulaid. Áed was succeeded by his great-nephew Fiachnae mac Báetáin.

Áed Dub — Black Áed — killed the last High King of Ireland to undergo the pre-Christian inauguration ritual, Diarmait mac Cerbaill. Tradition has Diarmaid die a mythic threefold death, and some version make Áed Diarmaid's foster-son. The Annals of Tigernach report, more prosaically, that Diarmaid was killed by Áed Dub in 565 at Ráith Bec, on the plain of Mag Line (Moylinny, near Larne), in the lands of the Dál nAraidi.

== Adomnán's account ==
In Book I, Chapter 36 of Adomnán of Iona's Life of Saint Columba, it states that Áed Dub was later ordained as a priest, an ordination that Adomnán describes as a sham because of his history of violence. He writes that when Columba learned of this, he prophesied that although Áed would live for many years to come, he "will return as a dog to his vomit; he will again be a bloody murderer and in the end, killed by a spear, he will fall from wood into water and die drowning." This is again the mythic three-fold death, and probably signifies that there was some manner of traditional account of Áed Dub. In the same chapter Adomnan also states that Áed was ordained to the priesthood by a bishop who was reluctant to do so. He only agreed to lay his hand on Áed's head to ordain him after a priest called Findchán had done so first. Adomnán says that this priest, Findchán, loved Áed Dub "in a carnal way".

From Adomnán's account it can be surmised that Áed was deposed, or abdicated, and spent time in Britain in a monastery before, presumably, returning to Ulster to try to regain his throne. The report of Áed Dub's death in the Annals of Ulster for 588 — the Annals of Tigernach place it in 579 — may contain some traces of this as it reports the killing of Áed aboard a ship. This is thought to have taken place on Lough Neagh.

== See also ==
- Kings of Dál nAraidi
- Kings of Ulster
