= Book of Cuanu =

The Book of Cuanu is a lost Irish Annal, which referred to events from the fifth to seventh centuries. It is referred to on over a dozen occasions in the Annals of Ulster, its entries having been terse accounts of battles or notable deaths.

In a short study concerning it, Eoghan O Mordha states that

"... by making use of the specific placename evidence in the entries attributed to the Book of Cuanu, it can be argued that, because the Cuanu entries display a bias towards recording events which took place for the most part in Lagin or the midlands, the entries can be regarded as being written somewhere in this general area."

The identity of Cuanu is uncertain.

== See also ==
- Irish annals
- Chronicle of Ireland
