= Rus Failge =

Reputed local king in 6th century Ireland

Rus Failge (fl. AD 507–514), also known as Ros Failgeach, was the King of the Uí Failge of what became County Offaly.

As the eponymous ancestor of the Uí Failge, he may be the son of the high king of Ireland, Cathair Mór, said to have lived in the early 2 cd century. This is the ancestor listed in the genealogies, though chronologically impossible. The Book of Leinster king list names an early king Failge Rot mac Cathair. The Uí Failge appear to have had an early leadership among the Laigin tribes. This is testified by the early Irish poem Timna Cathaír Máir ("The Testament of Cathair Mór) where Rus Failge is given the succession to his father.

Failge appears as the opponent of Fiachu mac Néill of the Ui Neill, founder of the Cenél Fiachach branch. In 507 Fiachu was defeated by Failge at the Battle of Frémainn (Frewin Hill, near Mullingar, County Westmeath). Fiachu had a false prophecy that he would win this battle and desired revenge. In 514 he achieved this revenge by defeating Failge at the Battle of Druim Derg. By this victory the plain of Mide was taken away from the Laigin and Fiachu conquered the territory from Birr to Uisnech in what became County Westmeath.
