= Richard Geoghegan (Galway) =

Irish landowner

Richard Geoghegan (1717–1800) was an Irish landowner.

A descendant of the Geoghegan clan, his ancestor, Art MacGeoghegan of Castletown, County Westmeath, was transplanted to Connacht in 1656, receiving a grant of nine hundred acres and Bunowen Castle near Doon Hill in Connemara, County Galway.

The Geoghegan family inhabited the original Bunowen Castle until Richard Geoghegan built a new castle (of the same name) at the foot of Doon Hill. An octagonal tower (folly) was also built by Geoghegan in the late 18th century, at the top of Doon Hill, to "celebrate the attainment of free trade in 1780".

Geoghegan, who was described by the historian James Hardiman as a "lover of science, and a man of enterprising genius", engaged in land reclamation in the area. John O'Donovan's 19th-century Ordnance Survey letters for Galway suggest that Richard Geoghegan studied a Dutch method of land reclamation, which resulted in recovering a tract of land from the sea at Ballyconneely. This work was commemorated by an inscription in Latin on a weir, dated 1758.

Richard Geoghegan died in 1800. His son, John David Geoghan, took the additional name of O'Neill. His grandson, John Augustus O'Neill, "went heavily into debt through his large unfinished additions to the 'castle'", and the family left the area during the 19th century.

== Works ==
- Geoghegan, Richard (1795), A prudent, or rather necessary caution, touching private arbitrations. Suggested by recent repeated and severe experience. Also, an humble proposal to improve or amend the law now in force, with regard to referees. By Richard Geoghegan, Esq. formerly of Bunowen, county of Galway, but now of Bella-Vista. county of Dublin, Dublin: A. Stewart
- Geoghegan, Richard (1785), Thoughts of Patricius an utilitist, on the interests of mankind, and particularly on those of the Irish nation, Dublin: Joseph Hill
