= Annals of Clonmacnoise =

17th-century Early Modern English translation of a lost Irish chronicle

- Subject: Ireland
- Publication place: Ireland

The Annals of Clonmacnoise (Irish: Annála Chluain Mhic Nóis) are an early 17th-century Early Modern English translation of a lost Irish chronicle, which covered events in Ireland from prehistory to 1408. The work is sometimes known as Mageoghagan's Book, after its translator Conall the Historian. David Sellar, who was the Lord Lyon King of Arms in Scotland, concluded that it dates from 1627. Robert Anthony Welch also stated that while it records history from the earliest times up to 1408, the original manuscript has been lost and it survives in an English translation that dates from 1627.

== Translation ==
The Irish chronicle was translated into English, in the style of the Elizabethan period, in 1627 by Conall Mag Eochagáin, of Lismoyny (County Westmeath), near Clara, County Offaly. Mag Eochagáin dedicated this translation to his brother-in-law, Toirdhealbhach Mac Cochláin, whose family was among the last to uphold and practice native Irish Gaelic customs.

The translation was completed on 20 April 1627, in the Castle of Lemanaghan in County Offaly. The original manuscript of Mag Eochagáin's translation is lost, but there are several copies of it in both the Library of Trinity College and in the British Museum.

The original work was in Irish Gaelic. Mag Eochagáin more than once refers "to the ould Irish book out of which he wrote, to the old Irish book which he translates, out of which many leaves were lost or stolen.." Mag Eochagáin seems to have preserved the value of the original Gaelic phraseology and rendered it every justice as far as we can determine in the absence of the original manuscript.

== Provenance of the original chronicle ==
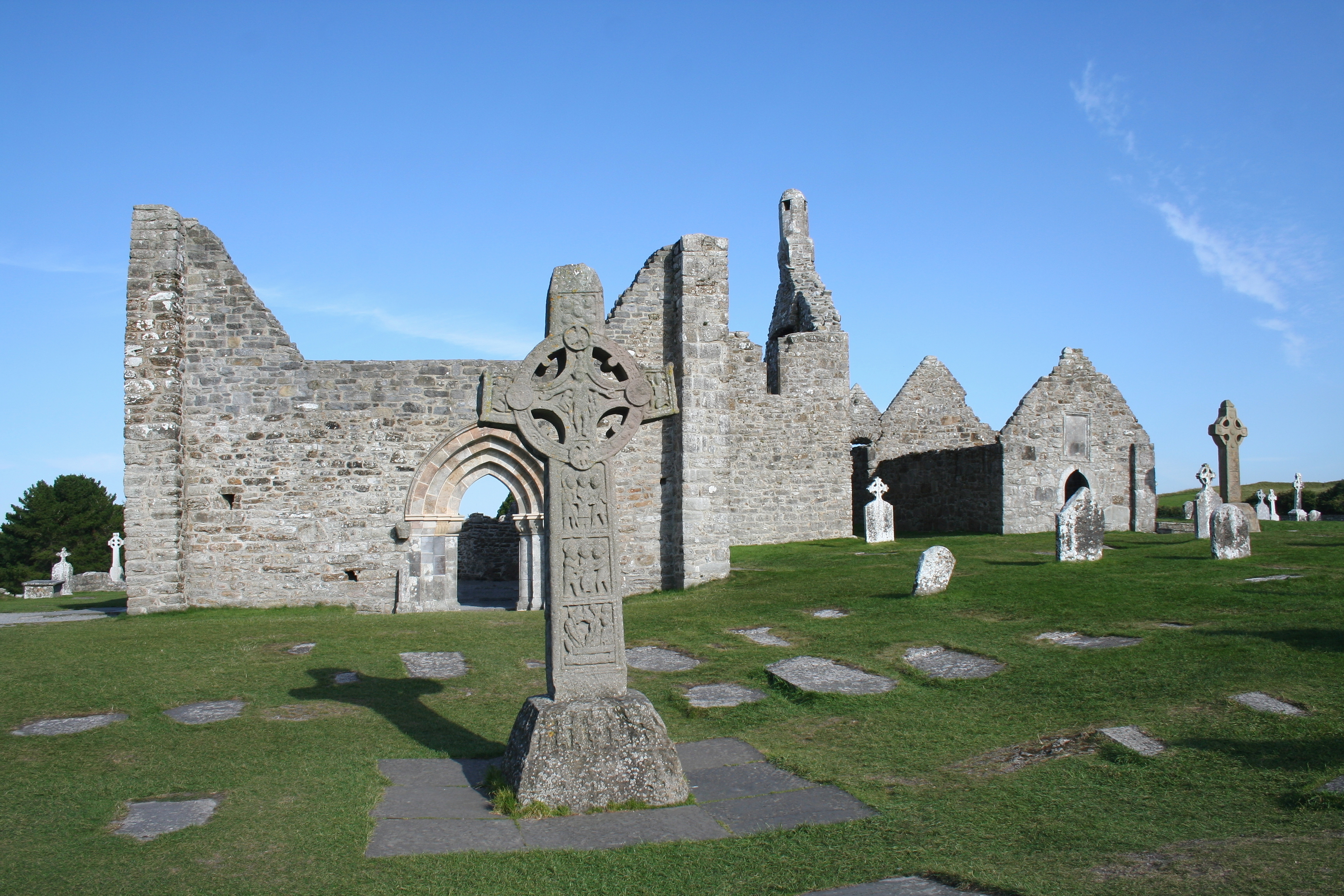
Ruins of Clonmacnoise ecclesiastical site.

The original manuscript or manuscripts of the Irish annals are lost, and the names of its compilers are unknown. These annals have usually gone by the name of the Annals of Clonmacnoise, because the work was thought to be based on materials gathered at the monastery of Clonmacnoise, though there is some doubt about this. In the book itself there is nothing to show why it should be called by this name. However, the Annals do give special prominence to the history of the parts of the country on both sides of the River Shannon at Clonmacnoise and to the families inhabiting the areas of Uí Maine (Hy Many) surrounding them, namely O'Kellys, O'Rourkes, O'Molloys, O'Connors and McDermotts. In addition, the text bears close similarities to the so-called Clonmacnoise-group of annalistic texts. The principal value of these Annals arises from the historical details given of these districts and families which are not found to the same extent elsewhere.

== Contents ==
The Annals give the history of Ireland and the areas surrounding Clonmacnoise from the creation of man to the year 1408. Mag Eochagáin points out that several parts of the original work are missing as from 1182 to 1199 and again from 1290 to 1299. He states that the originals were destroyed not merely by the books being burnt by marauding Vikings but also by tailors cutting the leaves of the books and slicing them off in long pieces to make their measures.

== Edition ==
The translation of the Annals was first published in Dublin in 1896 and again reprinted by Llanerch Publishers in 1993. Scholars have repeatedly called for a new edition as Murphy's edition has been deemed inadequate for modern scholarly purposes. Such scholars include Prof David Dumville who has bemoaned the "poor textual condition of the Annals of Clonmacnoise and the lack of adequate modern criticism of that text". Dr Nollaig O Muraile has also expressed a wish that someone will undertake one of "those great desiderata in this particular field – namely new, up-to-date editions of the Annals of Tigernach, of Mageoghegan's Book" (i.e. the Annals of Clonmacnoise).

- Murphy, Denis (ed.). The Annals of Clonmacnoise. Royal Society of Antiquaries of Ireland. Dublin, 1896. PDFs available from the Internet Archive here and here.

== See also ==
- Conall MacGeoghegan
- Irish annals
- The Chronicle of Ireland
