= Conall Cremthainne =

Irish king (died 480)

Conall Cremthainne (died 480), also called Conall Err Breg, was an Irish king. He was a son of Niall of the Nine Hostages, and one of the progenitors of the Southern Uí Néill dynasties.

He is the first king of Uisnech in Mide from the Uí Néill mentioned in the Book of Leinster king list. Conall son of Niall was nicknamed Cremthainne (possibly denoting fosterage among the Uí Chremthainn of Airgialla), to distinguish him from his brother Conall Gulban, ancestor of the Cenél Conaill. The habit of giving the same name to different sons remained common among the prolific Irish princes until the sixteenth century. According to a life of Saint Patrick by Tírechán, Patrick blessed Conall and rejected his brother Coirpre mac Néill, ancestor of the Cenél Coirpri, at a meeting at Tailtiu. Nothing is recorded of him in the annals other than his death date.

Through his son Fergus Cerrbél, he was the ancestor of the Clann Cholmáin and Síl nÁedo Sláine. Another son was Ardgal mac Conaill (died 520), ancestor of the Cenél nArdgail in County Meath.

== See also ==
- Kings of Uisnech

== Bibliography ==
- Annals of Ulster at CELT: Corpus of Electronic Texts at University College Cork
- Byrne, Francis John (2001), Irish Kings and High-Kings, Dublin: Four Courts Press, ISBN 978-1-85182-196-9
- Charles-Edwards, T. M. (2000), Early Christian Ireland, Cambridge: Cambridge University Press, ISBN 0-521-36395-0
- Book of Leinster,Rig Uisnig at CELT: Corpus of Electronic Texts at University College Cork
