= Kingdom of Meath =

Kingdom in east-central Ireland (1st–12th centuries)

- Coat of arms

- Meath about the year 900
- Capital: Tara
- Religion: Druidism (until 700s) Christianity (700s–1172)
Succeeded by
Lordship of Meath
- Today part of: Ireland

Meath (/miːð/ MEEDH; Modern Irish: Mí; Old Irish: Mide [ˈmʲiðʲe]) was a kingdom in Ireland from the 1st to the 12th century AD. Its name means "middle," denoting its location in the middle of the island.

At its greatest extent, it included all of County Meath (which takes its name from the kingdom), all of County Westmeath, and parts of counties Cavan, Dublin, Kildare, Longford, Louth and Offaly.

== History ==
Mide originally referred to the area around the Hill of Uisneach in County Westmeath, where the festival of Beltaine was celebrated. The larger province of Meath, between the Irish Sea and the Shannon, is traditionally said to have been created by Túathal Techtmar, an exemplar king, in the first century from parts of the other four provinces. In the fourth and fifth centuries its territories were taken over by the Uí Néill from Connacht and they pushed out Laigin tribes. The Uí Néill assumed the ancient titles of Kings of Uisnech in Mide and Kings of Tara in Brega and claimed a cattle-tribute, the Bóroma Laigen, on the Laigin. The Uí Failge, under Failge Berraide, were finally expelled from the plain of Mide with the battle of Druim Derg in 514. The Uí Enechglaiss were an early paramount dynasty of the Laigin. An ogham stone found south of Slane suggests they controlled the Brega area in County Meath together with Carbury Hill and the plains of Kildare. During the early 6th century, they were expelled across the Wicklow Mountains.

The Uí Failge and Uí Bairrche belonged to the Laigin but may also be associated with the Iverni.

In medieval Ireland, the Kings of Mide were of the Clann Cholmáin, a branch of the Uí Néill. They came to dominate their Southern Uí Néill kindreds, including the Síl nÁedo Sláine in County Meath, the Uí Failghe and Uí Faelain tribes of the Laigin and the Kingdom of Dublin. Several were High Kings of Ireland. The position alternated with their kindred the Northern Uí Néill for many centuries. The kingdom came under pressure in the 11th and 12th century from other provincial kings seeking the position of High King of Ireland and the Kingdom of Breifne under Tigernán Ua Ruairc. Mide was frequently overrun and partitioned and began to collapse as a coherent kingdom.

Following the Norman invasion of Ireland, in 1172, the kingdom was awarded to Hugh de Lacy as the Lordship of Meath by Henry II of England in his capacity as Lord of Ireland. De Lacy took possession of the kingdom and the dynasty of the Ua Mael Sechlainn or O Melaghlins were forced west and settled on the east bank of the River Shannon in the barony of Clonlonan. Bearers of the name were noted as among the Gaelic nobility as late as the 1690s, though they had lost power long before. Melaugh is the more commonly associated name in Ireland today, though it is more often rendered as McLoughlin.

== Province and diocese ==
Meath is also considered to have been one of five Provinces (Irish: cúige meaning "fifths") of Ireland, along with the four current provinces of Connacht, Leinster, Munster and Ulster. The Diocese of Meath established by the Synod of Ráth Breasail in 1111 had boundaries similar to those of the kingdom.

== See also ==
- List of kings of Meath
- Diocese of Meath

Present territories:

- Provinces of Ireland
- County Meath
- County Westmeath
