= MacGorman =

Irish Gaelic clan

MacGorman Mac Gormáin
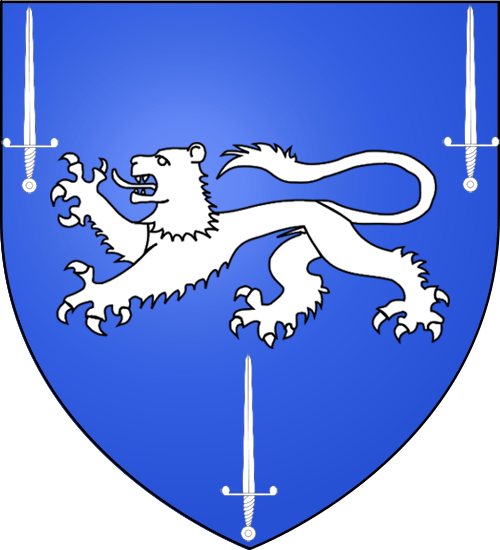
- Parent house: Laigin
- Country: Leinster, Thomond & Airgíalla
- Founder: Gormáín mac Eochaidh
- Titles: King of Leinster; King of Uí Bairrche; Standard Bearer of Thomond; Lord of Uí Bhreacáin; Lord of Tullycreen
- Cadet branches: Tubridy (possibly); McCarville (some)

MacGorman (Irish: Mac Gormáin), also known as McGorman, Gorman, or O'Gorman (Irish: Ó Gormáin), is an Irish Gaelic clan based most prominently in what is today County Clare and County Carlow. The paternal ancestors of the clan are of the Laigin and emerged in what is today County Waterford. As leaders of the Uí Bairrche, they competed with the Uí Cheinnselaig in the 5th century for the Kingship of Leinster, ultimately losing out in that specific arena, but holding on to significant lands in the Leinster area.

Through influence over the Sletty monastery founded by Fiacha mac Breccáin, the family played a role in early Christianity in Ireland. The Life of St. Patrick from the Book of Armagh was authored on the request of Áed of Sletty. As well as this, the mother of Columba of Iona came from this dynasty. After working to fight off the Vikings in Dublin and Waterford, the MacGormans eventually lost out to the Normans in the 12th century. The family relocated to Thomond upon being invited by the Ó Briain. From this point on they were Lords of Uí Bhreacáin until losing influence when Thomond's sovereignty came to an end.

== Etymology ==
There are multiple origins for the surname Gorman. The Irish name is an Anglicised form of the Gaelic Mac Gormáin and Ó Gormáin, meaning "son of Gormán" and "descendant of Gormán". The personal name Gormán is derived from the diminutive of gorm, meaning "dark blue", "noble". One English origin of the name is from the Middle English personal name Gormund (Old English Garmund). This name is made up of the elements gar "spear" + mund "protection". The English surname Gorman can also be a topographic name for someone who lived near a triangular piece of land. The German surname (Görmann) is sometimes a variant of Gehrmann. German Gorman can also be of Slavic origin, from an occupational name, derived from the Slavic góra meaning "mountain".

One of the earliest mentions of the name "Gorman" can be found in a reference by Geoffrey of Monmouth to a Danish king named "Gormandus" who raided parts of Britain around 593 AD and settled near South Wexford.

Early bearers of the surname are William Gorman in 1296 and Adam Garman in 1327. The John atte Gore recorded in 1296 within the Sussex Subsidy Rolls is identical with the John Gorman recorded in 1332.

Male	Daughter	Wife (Long)	Wife (Short)
Mac Gormáin	Nic Ghormáin	Bean Mhic Ghormáin	Mhic Ghormáin
Ó Gormáin	Ní Ghormáin	Bean Uí Ghormáin	Uí Ghormáin

== Irish Mac Gormáin family ==
Most of the following is taken from a family history composed by Allan O'Gorman of Vancouver, British Columbia, Canada, in 1966, based largely on notes obtained from Father John Robert O'Gorman of Renfrew, Ontario, Canada, who conducted family research at Dublin Castle in 1903. A copy of Allan O'Gorman's document was presented to Naoise Cleary and Ger Kennedy of the Clare Cultural Centre in Corofin, County Clare, in July, 1989, by Brendan Vincent Justin O'Gorman of Toronto, Ontario, Canada, a great-nephew of Father John Robert O'Gorman. According to Keating, the Mac Gormáin family descended from the chieftains of the Uí Bairrche. The family lived in Leinster and held the lands of Slievemargy in present-day County Laois and lands near Carlow. The family was forced from the lands with the arrival of the Normans and moved into County Monaghan. According to James Frost, the family was likely driven from the lands by the Norman lord Walter de Riddlesford, who became the master of Carlow at around this time. A poem, written by Maoelin Oge MacBrody (the MacBrodys were the ollaves of the Uí Bairrche), states that after the Mac Gormáin family was driven from its lands a group of them made for Ulster and another made westwards towards Daire Seanleath in Uaithne Cliach (Uaithne Cliach is the modern barony of Owney, in County Limerick). The family then settled in lands controlled by the O'Briens, settling in the area of Ibrackan. The Mac Gormáin family of Ibrickan were known in the 15th century for their wealth, hospitality and their patronage of the Gaelic poets. The first of the family to settle in Munster was Murtagh, son of Donogh. The chiefs of the family held parts of the lands of Moyarta and Ibrackan in County Clare. A branch of the family were hereditary marshalls to the O'Briens and held lands in Clare. The family is listed as one of the septs of Thomond in 1317.

Today the members of the family bear Anglicised names such as Gorman, MacGorman, McGorman, and O'Gorman. Most members of the family bear the names Gorman or O'Gorman despite the original Gaelic names was Mac Gormáin. According to MacLysaght, this is because at the time of the Gaelic revival in Ireland, the majority of bearers of the name had dropped all prefixes from their name. Though with the revival many Gormans mistaking added the historically incorrect prefix (O') because they did not know any better. MacLysaght thought that the man who was chiefly responsible for the choice in the prefix was the Frenchman Chevalier Thomas O'Gorman (1725–1808), who constructed Irish pedigrees after being ruined in the French Revolution. Within the 1669 Census of Ireland, the surnames Gormon and Gorman are listed as principal names for two baronies within County Clare: 9 Gormons are recorded in the Islands barony which consisted of 1651 people; and 6 Gormans are recorded in the barony of Moyferta, which consisted of 1024 people. In the 17th century O'Gorman was a principal name of County Armagh; and McGorman was a principal name of counties Monaghan and Louth. In 1890 most O'Gormans are found in County Clare.

== History ==
=== Descent from Cathair Mór, High King ===
According to historian C. Thomas Cairney, the MacGormans were one of the chiefly families of the Uí Bairrche who were a tribe of the Erainn who were the second wave of Celts to settle in Ireland between about 500 and 100 BC.

The Uí Bairrche kindred of the Laigin took their name from Dairé Barrach, a son of Cathair Mór, who lived during the 2nd century AD. It is possible that they are mentioned in Ptolemy’s Geographia as the Brigantes; it is unknown what connection, if any, they have to similarly named groups in Britain or Europe. Ptolemy may have simply used the term because of its phonetic similarity. In any case, Dairé lived at Dún Ailinne, one of the ancient Gaelic royal sites of Ireland and capital of the Laigin, located in what is now County Kildare. From here he gained a pupil in Mug Nuadat, ancestor of the Eóganachta, whom he supported in becoming King of Munster in conflict with Conn of the Hundred Battles. Dáire himself may have been High King of Ireland for a “difficult month” if the 7th century AD poem about the early Kings of Tara named Baile Chuinn Chétchathaig is to be believed.

=== Kings of Leinster and the Uí Bairrche ===
The Uí Bairrche are thought to have originally held lands around what is today County Wexford in the area named after them; Bargy (Uí Bairrche). At this time they were very powerful, as one of the sons of Dáire Barrach named Muiredach Mo Sníthech is listed by the 5th century poet Laidcenn mac Bairchid, as a King of Leinster and may have possibly even ruled at the Hill of Tara. The kingship of the Uí Bairrche descended through another son of Dáire named Fiacha. What is known from this time is that the Uí Bairrche lost out in a power struggle with their cousins the Uí Cheinnselaig, who as a consequence pushed them out of their lands and allowed the Déisi Muman to settle there instead, according to the tales in the Expulsion of the Déisi. Indeed, they only returned when Eochaidh Guinech of the Uí Bairrche killed his maternal grandfather Crimthann mac Énnai, King of Leinster in 483. Eochaidh “took the oak with its root” (made total war) with the Déisi and subsequently drove part of them into Ossory.

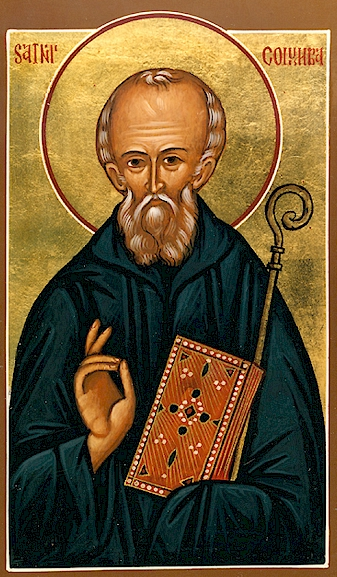
Columba of Iona's mother Eithne was from the Uí Bairrche.

The Uí Bairrche had an important role in the early days of the Christian Church in Ireland. A member of the family, Fiacha mac Breccáin was said to have been converted to Christianity by Patrick himself. Fiacha was a bard and his uncle Dubthach maccu Lugair was the Chief Ollamh of Ireland; the conversion of the two helped to reconcile elements of native Gaelic tradition with Christianity. Fiacha founded a monastery at Sleaty and is considered a saint by Christians. His brother Ailill Mór mac Breccáin moved north during the political turmoil in Leinster and his grandson Sinnell mac Manach was Abbot of Cleenish (Cluan Innish) and later considered a saint; it is here, under Sinnell, that Columbanus began his studies. The mother of Colm Cille (Columba of Iona) named Eithne also descended from Ailill Mór mac Breccáin. Later on, in the 7th century, Aodh, the Abbot of Sleaty was the man who requested the writing of the Vita sancti Patricii (Life of St. Patrick), contained in the Book of Armagh.

When the Uí Bairrche had returned to Leinster, they moved to Slíabh Mairge (Slievemargy), in what is today the south-east corner of County Laois, as well as parts of County Carlow and County Kilkenny. The kindred still had a prominent position; the mother of Diarmait mac Cerbaill (died 565), the last High King of Ireland inaugurated according to the traditional Gaelic pagan rites, was Corbach, daughter of Maine, a member of the Uí Bairrche. A notable king of the age was Cormac mac Diarmata, whom many Christian hagiographies associated with their rivals the Uí Cheinnselaig or the Osaraighe; such as that of Abbán and Cainnech of Aghaboe; paint him as pillaging monasteries and the like. Cormac and his brother Crimthann are also described as being in conflict with Finnian of Clonard. Cormac was closely associated with Comgall and gave him some lands, before retiring to become a monk at Bangor.

=== "Gormandus" invades post-Roman Britain ===
One of the more unusual stories is that of Gormáin mac Diarmata, another brother of Cormac. He is mentioned in various sources, including the Annals of Ireland written by Friar John Clyn and Thady Dowling, the Topography of Ireland by Gerald of Wales, the History of the Kings of Britain by Geoffrey of Monmouth and even the Annales of William Camden. What these sources say is that around 593 AD, Gormáin invaded Britain, fought several battles and sacked a number of monasteries. He is said to have sacked the Llanbadarn Fawr monastery, Ceredigion and Camden claims the Amesbury monastery containing three hundred monks was destroyed by him. His name is sometimes stylised differently such as Gormandus, Gordmundus or Gurmundus. In the account of Geoffrey of Monmouth he is bizarrely transformed into a king of Africa. Most of the native Annals in Ireland which are untouched by the Normans and Arthurian literature are quiet on the matter.

=== Uí Bairrche interaction with the Vikings ===
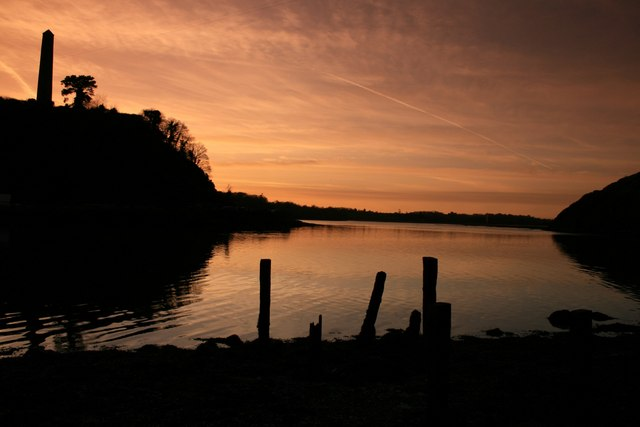
The Mac Gormáin resisted the Vikings at Wexford, which is named in Gaeilge, Loch Garman.

In the 7th century, Suibhne mac Domhnall; grandson of Cormac mac Diarmata; came into conflict with Fintán of Taghmon (died 635), also known as Munnu. After allegedly being insulted by Suibhne, this abbot made a prophecy which envisaged that Subhne would have his head cut off by his own brother and that his severed head would be thrown in the River Barrow. Suibhne's brother Failbe eventually married Eithne, daughter of Crundmael mac Rónáin, King of the Uí Cheinnselaig. Various branches of the Uí Bairrche are mentioned in the Annals of the Four Masters with the advent of the Viking Age in Ireland. This includes Conn mac Cinaedh (died 866) of the Uí Bairrche Tire, who we are told died while “demolishing the fortress of the foreigners”, most likely the settlement at Dublin on the River Liffey. Around the area of Uí Bairrche and the Laigin more generally, we know that the Vikings pillaged Dún Másc in 842 and established a settlement at Loch Garman (later known as Wexford), close to Bargy.

=== Mac Gormáin in Airgíalla as clerics ===
Just prior to the Norman invasion of Ireland, a number of Mac Gormáin are found to have been in prominent clerical roles as writers and teachers. Some of the most significant of these were invited to Airgíalla by Donnchadh Ó Cearbhaill. A religious reformer and a prominent political player, Donnchadh had just conquered territory from the Conaille Muirtheimne (what is today County Louth) and established Arrouaisian Order religious foundations at Louth, Knockabbey and Termonfeckin there. From the Mac Gormáin family, Máel Caoimhghin Mac Gormáin was put in place as the master of Louth and abbot of Termonfeckin and Máel Muire Mac Gormáin as the abbot of Knockabbey. Máel Muire (Marianus) is the man who authored the Martyrology of Gorman in 1166.

There were other prominent Mac Gormáín clerics in the north around this time; Fionn Mac Gormáin, Bishop of Kildare and abbot of Newry (also founded by Donnchadh Ó Cearbhaill, on the encouragement of Maelmhaedhoc Ó Morgair), who helped to author the Book of Leinster with Áed mac Crimthainn and finally Flann Mac Gormáin (1099–1174), the chief lector of the School of Armagh and all Ireland. The latter spent twenty-one years at universities in Paris and Oxford before working on the development of a similar institution at Armagh. This had been established by Ruairí Ó Conchubhair, High King of Ireland and was dedicated to Patrick. This school was never allowed to develop to its full potential as it was soon destroyed by the Normans.

It is likely that the latter-day Gormans and McGormans of County Monaghan and County Antrim originate from this population movement. Mac Gormáin heritage in the north is remembered in several place names referencing them. The majority of these are in County Monaghan; Feartach Ghormáin (Fartagorman) in Magheross, Coill Uí Ghormáin (Killygorman) in Killeevan, and Lios Gormáin (Lisdungorman) in Clontibret. Aside from this, there is also a Ráth Gormáin (Rathgorman) in County Down.

=== Mac Gormáin pushed out to Thomond ===
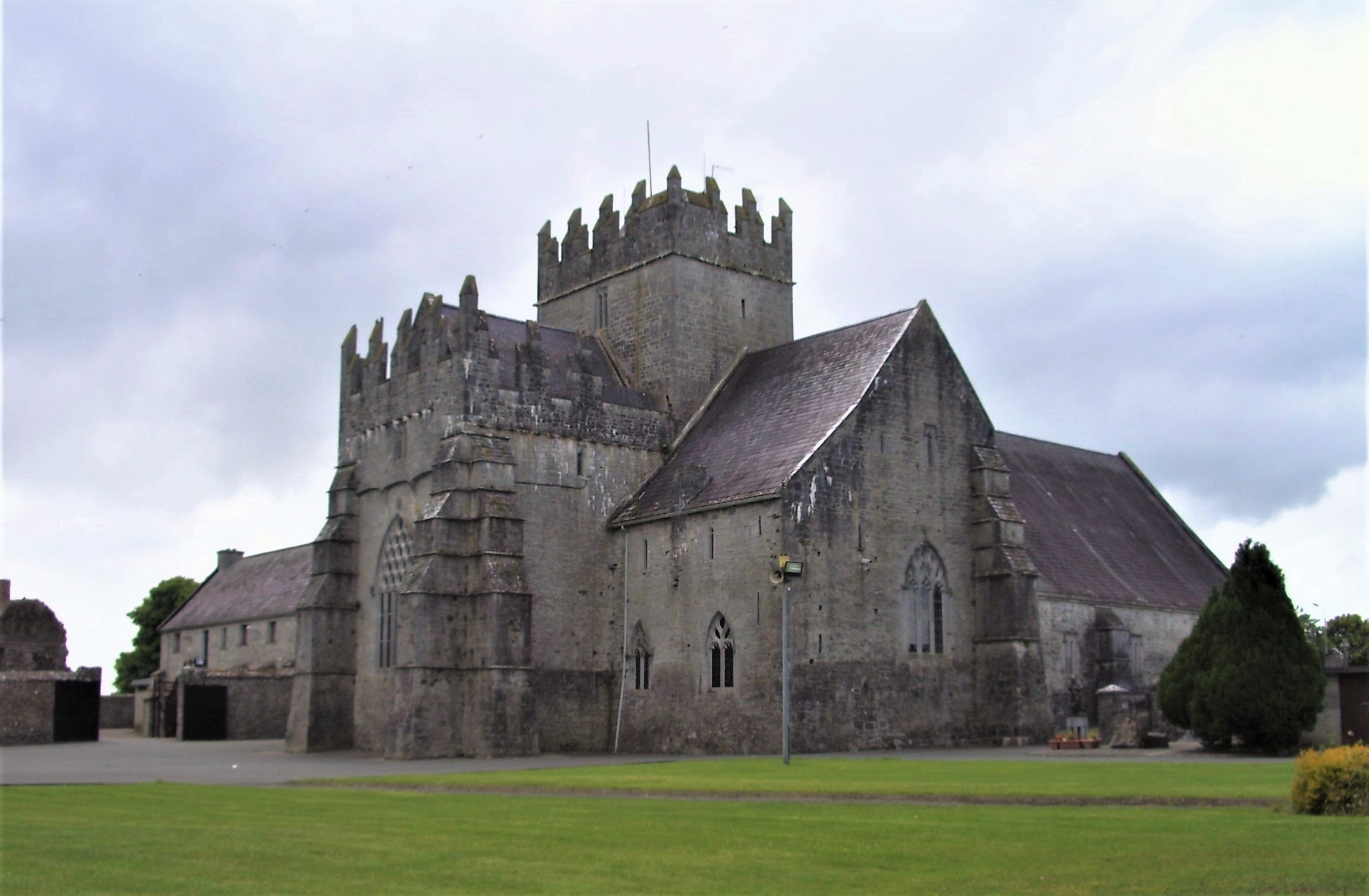
The Mac Gormáin made links to the Ó Briain by supporting the Holy Cross Abbey at Thurles.

Murchadh mac Eachthighearn was driven from his territories of Uí Bairrche by the Norman invaders Walter de Riddlesford, John de Clahull and Hugh de Lacy during the 1170s. Riddlesford, who took over as a master at Carlow, had married the daughter of a bastard son of a king Henry I of England which left him in a prominent position among his own people. At first Murchadh settled at Daire Seanleath in Uaithne Cliach (what is today Owney, County Limerick), but his son Cumeth mac Murchadh was invited by Donnchadh Cairprech Ó Briain, King of Thomond to settle in Uí Bhreacáin (what is known as Ibrickan, County Clare). In fact the Mac Gormáin had built a good relationship with the Ó Briain prior to the Norman invasion, as early as 1168, as Scanlan mac Gormáin supported Domhnall Mór Ó Briain, by witnessing for him a charter to the Holy Cross Abbey, Thurles.

One of the most notable members of the family was a female, who became Queen of Thomond. Éadaoin Nic Ghormáin (1321–1367) married Muirchertach Ó Briain (1289–1343), King of Thomond and they included among their children, two further kings; Mathghamhain Maonmhaighe Ó Briain (died 1369) and Toirdelbach Maol Ó Briain (died 1398). Their descendants include the rest of the Kings of Thomond. The context in which this marriage came about, is to be taken from the famous 14th century literary work Caithréim Thoirdhealbhaigh ("The Triumphs of Turlough"), which mentions that the Mac Gormáin family had become Standard Bearers of the Clann Tadhg branch of the Ó Briain, stating that Cuebha Mac Gormáin was for Muirchertach's father Toirdelbach mac Tadhg Ó Briain his "close door of protection while he slept and, on the battlefield, the shield that covered him."

de Clare arms: the Mac Gormáin supported Clann Tadhg against the Norman de Clares.

The Wars of Thomond, as the events of these times were called, were essentially a civil war between two rival branches of the Ó Briain; the conflicting branches were known as Clann Tadhg and Clann Brian Ruadh. There was also the added factor of Norman divide and rule intrigue. Briain Ruadh Ó Briain and his nephew Toirdelbach mac Tadhg Ó Briain came into conflict over the kingship of Thomond. As part of a plan to win back the kingdom, Briain Ruadh went to Thomas de Clare (a Norman), close friend of king Edward I of England and attempted to enlist his support in return for land to colonise. A seven-year civil war ensued with Toirdelbach emerging victorious, with help from the Mac Con Mara, Ó Deághaidh and of course, the Mac Gormáin clans. Evidently, having been driven West by the Normans in the first place, the Mac Gormáin were not willing to be turned out again.

Throughout the rest of the period of Gaelic rule in Thomond, the Mac Gormáin continued to hold a significant position in society. Indeed, Domhnall Mac Gormáin (died 1484) was described as the wealthiest man in all of Ireland in terms of the livestock in his possession. The king during this period would have been Conchobhar na Srona Ó Briain. It must be remembered that, during Domhnall's life, cattle was the main element of the pastoral economy; the Gaelic kingdoms did not mint their own coinage. So to be wealthy in terms of livestock was the main measure of wealth in Gaelic Ireland. The Mac Gormáin were known having open houses, nourishing the poor and being patrons of a bardic poet, especially the Mac Bruaideadha family. Indeed, Tadhg mac Dáire Mhic Bhruaideadha authored a poem about them.

=== Mac Gormáin in Tudor and Stuart Ireland ===
In the year 1543, Thomond joined the Kingdom of Ireland under the Tudor dynasty of the king Henry VIII of England. The formerly sovereign King of Thomond, Murchadh Carrach Ó Briain became the Earl of Thomond in the peerage of Ireland. His nephew, Donnchadh Ó Briain, who had long since joined the English service, became Baron Ibrackan (named for the territory associated with the Mac Gormáin).

During the reign of the Stuart dynasty king James I of England, the Mac Gormáin held lands from Tadhg Caech Mac Mathghamha, Lord of West Corcavaskin, specifically named lands in their hands include; Clooncullin, Kilmacduane, Ballynagur, Moyarta, Knockerra, Clohanbeg, Clohamore and Cahermurphy.

During the reign of Charles I of England, Máel Sechlainn Mac Gormáin (died 1 May 1605) held lands at Drom Oilche (Dromelihy) and passed them onto his son Diarmuid Mac Gormáin. At Drom Díogais (Drumdigus) we find lands held by Tadhg Mac Gormáin (died 1630) also the owner of Tulach an Chrainn (Tullycrine) and known for his wife's association with a certain "holy well” at Kilmihil. There was also a Scannláin Mac Gormáin who owned the castle at Cathair Murchadha (Cahermurphy) in the early 1620s.

=== 1641 Rebellion and Civil War in Clare ===
The 1640s were a particularly troublesome period, with the Rising of 1641 and all of the events which followed it, including the Irish Confederate Wars and finally the landing of Oliver Cromwell in 1649;

The Mac Gormáin of Cahermurphy actually took part in one of the most significant and controversial events in Thomond of the Rebellion of 1641 and that was the Siege of Tromra Castle. The castle had been taken over by English Protestant settlers, the family of Peter Ward, protected by Sir Domhnall Ó Briain. An ambitious raid on the castle, looking to take livestock, was led by Edmond O'Flaherty from the Aran Islands, joined by men from Connemara (what used to be Iar Connacht). Some of the local clans of Thomond also joined in. Three members of the Ward family died but the rest made it out to safety, fleeing to Dublin.

In 1641, Dromelihy was under the ownership of Domhnall Mac Gormáin, Cathair Mac Gormáin and Sir Domhnall Ó Briain. After the victory of the Cromwellian side during the conflict, certain Catholics in other parts of Ireland were “transplanted” to Connacht (which then included County Thomond), to make way for the Protestant English incomers on better lands. This included the Norman-descended Catholics, Annie and Martha Eustace who were; according to the Act of Settlement 1662; transplanted into the lands of what was Mac Gormáin territory in Dromelihy. Ó Briain himself still remained a land owner in the area and was raised to Viscount Clare in 1662. After the overthrow of James II of England in the Revolution of 1688 and the failure of the Jacobites during the Williamite War in Ireland, these lands were going to be "given" to the Dutchman, Arnold van Keppel, Earl of Albemarle but as he had no interest in them they were instead “given” over to Francis Burton, Nicholas Westby and James MacDonnell in 1698.

According to John Robert O'Gorman, a Catholic priest from Canada; he found information at the Records Office in Dublin about the fate of the Tullycrine estate and found that Máel Sechlainn Mac Gormáin's property was confirmed by Charles II in 1679 to have passed to one Captain William Hamilton. Family tradition; especially among the diaspora in North America where some descendants ended up; states the land was confiscated during Cromwellian times and this may have simply been a confirmation of an earlier fact. They are later found around their former estates as simply tenant farmers at Tarmon. A significant number of Gormans moved out of County Clare into County Tipperary.

=== Ascendancy Ireland, Penal Laws and decline ===
During the Penal Laws, Catholics were persecuted and blocks put in their way to stop them from owning significant tracts of land and generally building themselves up in society. It is this social situation which would eventually lead to the Great Hunger in the 1840s. Although the majority of the Gormans remained Catholic, a number converted to the Anglican Church of Ireland for pragmatic reasons. These are listed by James Frost as Sylvester Gorman of Drumellihy in 1750, James Gorman of Killilahane in 1758 and finally Thady Gorman of Sheeaun in 1766. The last two are described as gentlemen. Chevalier Thomas O’Gorman also lived during this time period. He was a Jacobite from near Tullycrine and served with the Irish Brigade of the French Army. He married into the French aristocracy but lost out during the French Revolution. He was a noted genealogist, owning for some time the Book of Ballymote.

=== Emancipation and Irish nationalism ===
A number of members of the family, under the name O'Gorman, played a prominent role in Irish national politics. Nicholas Purcell O'Gorman (1778–1857) was a barrister who worked with Daniel O'Connell, "the Liberator" towards the goal of Catholic Emancipation in Ireland; indeed O'Gorman was the Secretary of the Catholic Association. One of his sons, Major Purcell O'Gorman (1818–1888) was a Member of Parliament for Waterford City as a member of the Home Rule League and a supporter of Parnell. His older brother, Nicholas Smith O'Gorman, was a High Sheriff of Clare.

A nationalist figure, the O'Gorman Mahon, also carried the family name, but this was from his mother Barbara O'Gorman. On the more radical republican end of the political spectrum, Richard O'Gorman (1820–1895) was a member of the Young Ireland movement which rose in the Young Irelander Rebellion of 1848. Indeed, along with William Smith O'Brien and Thomas Francis Meagher, he visited the newly formed Second French Republic in 1840 and returned with the Irish Tricolour which later became the national flag after 1922.

== Symbols ==
The coat of arms of O'Gorman (pictured) are blazoned azure a lion passant between three swords erect argent; the crest an arm embowed in armour, grasping in the hard a sword, blade wavy, all proper.; and the mottoes "TUS AGUS DEIREADH AN CATHA" (Irish) and "INITIUM FINEMQUE BELLO" (Latin). The Irish motto translates as "The beginning and end of battle", a reference to their role as hereditary marshals of the O'Briens of Thomond, the standard bearers and lifeguards who would accompany the (O'Brien) king as the first ones on and last ones off the field of battle. The Latin motto translates as "first and last in war". In 1763, the arms were allowed by the Ulster King of Arms to Thomas O'Gorman (fourth in descent from Mahon O'Gorman) and to Thomas O'Gorman (fourth in descent from Denis O'Gorman, brother of Cahir O'Gorman).

== Related surnames ==
Surnames that are variants of, or that share a similar etymology to Gorman are:

- English origin: Garman, Garment, Garmons, Gore, Gorer.
- German origin: Gehrmann, Görmann.
- Irish origin: O'Gorman, MacGorman, McGorman.

== People with the surname Gorman ==
- Amanda Gorman (born 1998), American poet and activist
- Andy Gorman (born 1974), Welsh footballer
- Archie Gorman (1909–1992), Scottish footballer
- Arthur Pue Gorman (1839–1906), United States Senator from Maryland
- Arthur Pue Gorman Jr. (1873–1919), Maryland state senator
- Bartley Gorman (1944–2002), British bare-knuckle boxer
- Brian Gorman (born 1959), American former umpire
- Burn Gorman (born 1974), British actor
- Carl Nelson Gorman (1907–1998), Navajo code talker, painter, printmaker, professor
- Daniel Gorman, British arts manager and human rights worker
- Dave Gorman (born 1971), British documentary-comedian and humorist
- Dave Gorman (ice hockey) (1955–2025), Canadian ice hockey player
- David Gorman (cricketer) (born 1955), English cricketer
- Edward Gorman (1941–2016), American novelist
- Edwin Gorman (1892–1963), Canadian hockey player
- Eugene Gorman (1891–1973), Australian lawyer
- Francis J. Gorman (1924–1987), American politician
- H. Candace Gorman, American civil rights attorney
- Herb Gorman (1924–1953), American baseball player
- James Gorman (VC) (1834–1882), British recipient of the Victoria Cross
- James S. Gorman (1850–1923), American politician
- John Gorman (disambiguation), multiple people
- Lawrence C. Gorman (1898–1953), American Roman Catholic priest and educator
- Lee A. Gorman (1895–unknown), American politician and soldier
- Lisa Gorman, Australian fashion designer
- Lou Gorman (1929–2011), American baseball executive, general manager of the Boston Red Sox 1984–1993
- Margaret Gorman (1905–1995), American model and beauty queen, first Miss America winner
- Martha Gorman Schultz (1931–2025), American Diné weaver
- Melissa Gorman (born 1985), Australian long-distance swimmer
- Michael Gorman (born 1941), American librarian
- Michael A. Gorman (1950–2012), American politician
- Mike Gorman (born 1945), American former basketball commentator
- Nathan Gorman (born 1996), British boxer
- Nolan Gorman (born 2000), American baseball player
- Owen Gorman (1799–1862), British Army officer and commandant of the Moreton Bay penal colony
- Paul Gorman (disambiguation), multiple people
  - Paul Gorman, British journalist, writer and pop culture historian
  - Paul F. Gorman (1927–2026), American Army four-star general
- Pierre Gorman (1924–2006), Australian librarian and educator
- R. C. Gorman (1931–2005), Native American painter and printmaker
- Robert A. Gorman (born 1937), American lawyer, law professor at the University of Pennsylvania Law School
- Robert J. Gorman, (1915–2007), American civil rights attorney
- Ross Gorman (c. 1890–1953), American jazz musician
- Russ Gorman (1926–2017), Australian politician
- Stephanie Gorman (born 2000), Australian basketball player
- Suzy Gorman (born 1962), American photographer
- Teresa Gorman (1931–2015), British politician, former Conservative Member of Parliament
- Thomas Gorman (disambiguation), multiple people
- W. M. Gorman (1923–2003), Irish economist
- Willis A. Gorman (1816–1876), American politician

== See also ==
- Irish clans
