= List of national monuments in County Laois =

The Irish state has officially approved the following list of national monuments in County Laois. In the Republic of Ireland, a structure or site may be deemed to be a "national monument", and therefore worthy of state protection, if it is of national importance. If the land adjoining the monument is essential to protect it, this land may also be protected.

== National Monuments ==
NM#	Monument name	Description	Image	Townland	Location
540	Aghnahily Ringfort	Ringfort		Aghnahily	53°01′33″N 7°12′21″W
567	Coorlaghan Ringfort	Ringfort		Coorlaghan	52°50′14″N 7°00′39″W
615	Dunamase Castle	Castle		Portlaoise and Stradbally	53°01′55″N 7°12′39″W
113	St. Kieran's Church	Church & Cross		Errill	52°51′11″N 7°40′19″W
114.01	Fossy Church	Church		Fossy Lower	52°57′27″N 7°11′25″W
115	Killeshin Church	Church		Killeshin	52°50′51″N 7°00′05″W
116	Sleaty Church	Church & Crosses		Sleaty	52°51′29″N 6°56′31″W
114.02	Timahoe Church	Church & Round Tower		Timahoe	52°57′38″N 7°12′13″W

== Sources ==
- National Monuments in County Laois
