= Sleaty Church =

Medieval church in County Laois, Ireland

- Séipéal Shléibhte
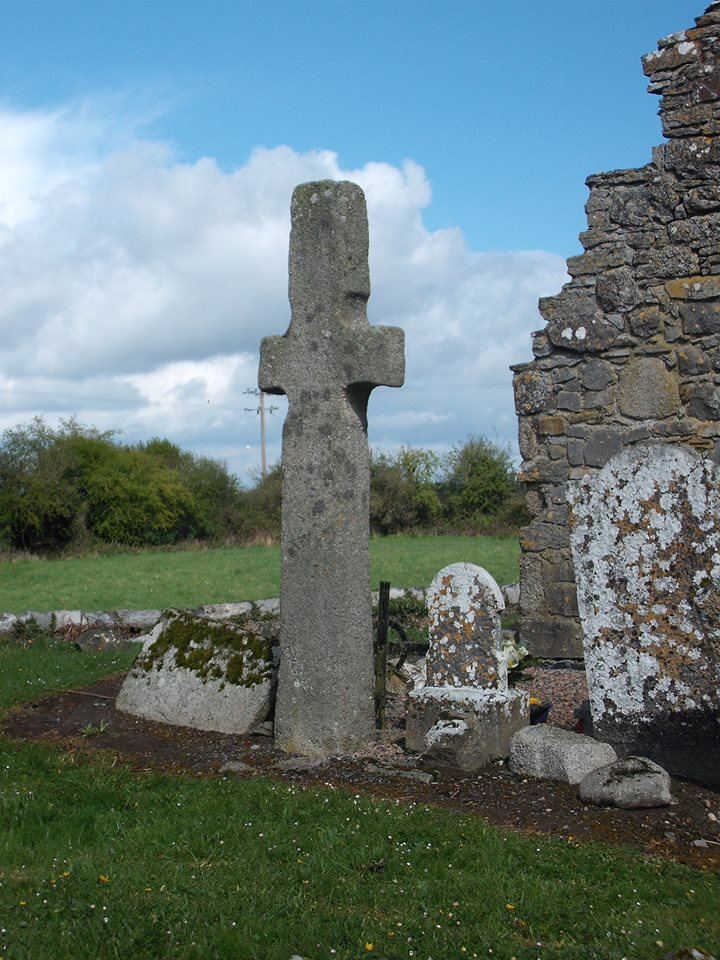

- Location within Ireland
- Interactive map of Sleaty Church

Monastery information
- Other name: Sletty Church
- Order: Celtic Christianity
- Diocese: Leighlin

People
- Founder: Saint Fiacc

Architecture
- Status: Inactive
- Heritage designation: National Monument
- Style: Irish monastic

Site
- Location: Sletty, County Laois
- Coordinates: 52.858035°N 6.941791°W
- Visible remains: Ruined church, two undecorated crosses
- Public access: yes

Sleaty Church is a medieval church and National Monument located in County Laois, Ireland.

== Location ==
Sleaty Church is located about 2.5 km (1½ miles) north of Carlow town, on the west bank of the River Barrow.

== History ==
A monastery was founded on the south side of the stream by Saint Fiacc (c. 415–520). According to legend, Fiacc founded the church of Domnach-Fiech, east of the River Barrow. To this church Saint Patrick presented sacred vestments, a bell, a manuscript of the Pauline Epistles and a crosier. After many years of austere life in this place, Fiacc was led by angelic command to remove to the west of the Barrow, for there "he would find the place of his resurrection". The legends state that he was directed to build his oratory where he should meet a hind (female red deer) and his refectory where he should find a boar. He consulted Patrick, the who fixed the site of his new church at Slebhte (Sletty, Sleaty).

Áed of Sletty was a seventh-century bishop of Sletty and was one of the first biographers of St. Patrick. Sletty was a historic residence of the King of Leinster. The last historical reference to Sletty is from 1055, after which the site lost importance.

The two undecorated crosses date back to the monastic period, whereas the church is medieval in date, although some of the larger stones used in its construction may come from the earlier foundation: large boulders were common in early Christian construction.

== Buildings ==
=== Church ===
The medieval church is largely ruined. The church is 14.25 metres (46.8 ft) in length, 9 metres (30 ft) in width and is largely built of coursed limestone blocks, with the exception of the east gable which was rebuilt at some stage with sandstone. The granite jambs used in its construction may be taken from the earlier monastery. The only features of the church left are a broken window in the east of the south gable and a semi-pointed doorway to the west.

An octagonal baptismal font, made from roughly dressed granite, stands near the doorway. it could also be recycled from the monastery.

=== Crosses ===
The smaller, southern of the two granite crosses from the earlier foundation is roughly 1.5 metres (4.9 ft) high and is decorated with a rough ringed cross. The taller, western cross is 2.8 metres (9.2 ft) high and is undecorated. It is made from a single piece of granite and features distinctive cusps where the arms meet the shaft.
