= Chevalier O'Gorman =

Irish soldier and genealogist

- Born: Thomas O'Gorman; 16 September 1732
- Died: 18 November 1809 (aged 77)
- Spouse: Marguerite Françoise d'Éon (after 1757)
- Children: Charles Thomas, comte O'Gorman Louis Auguste, vicomte O'Gorman Joseph Donat dit le chevalier O'Gorman d'Éon
- Parent(s): Patrick O'Gorman; Margaret O'Loughlin
- Family: MacGorman

Tomás, Chevalier O'Gorman or Tomás Ó Gormáin (or Mac Gormáin) (1732–1809) was an Irish soldier, antiquary, genealogist, and wine exporter.

== Early life ==
O'Gorman was born in Castletown, County Clare, Ireland, to Patrick O'Gorman and Margaret O'Loughlin. He was a descendant of the ancient MacGorman clan, a Gaelic noble family whose ancestors were the Uí Bairrche. He was a close relative of some of the highest Jacobites in France, such as Charles O'Brien de Thomond and Jean-Baptiste Mac Nemara.

== Career ==
The Dictionary of Irish Biography from the Royal Irish Academy notes that O'Gorman was educated at the Irish College, Paris and the Collège Mazarin: "He probably attended a hedge school in Clare, before being educated at Paris in the Irish College and later at the Collège Mazarin, where he qualified as a medical doctor." In 1750, he had introduced hurling to Paris to mark St Patrick’s Day.

O'Gorman's native language was Irish Gaelic, but he also spoke English and French. He could read in Ogham and was likely familiar with Latin and Greek, due to his profession as a doctor. He served with the Irish Brigade in the Regiment de Walsh in the French army as a Captain and was created Chevalier by Louis XV.

O'Gorman married the sister of Chevalier d'Éon, and from him inherited vast vineyards in Tonnerre, Yonne (Burgundy), but lost them in the French Revolution.

== Burgundy wine ==
For years, O'Gorman and his brother-in-law sold large quantities of Burgundy wine. The two men often used it for diplomatic purposes; in particular, O'Gorman sold some to his friend Benjamin Franklin.

== Genealogy ==
=== Genealogy for Irish Jacobites ===
The Chevalier O'Gorman compiled pedigrees of Irish expatriates. Several Irish Jacobites, such as the Count Alejandro O'Reilly, who employed him in 1786, asked for his help in studying genealogy. In 1791, Maurice-François de Mac-Mahon, father of Patrice de Mac Mahon, future duke of Magenta, maréchal de France et président de la République française, asked for his services. Others, such as the MacCarthys of Toulouse, the Butler of Rochelle, Roches and Kearneys of County Clare, and the O’Neils, requested his services as well.

== Ancient Irish history ==
After this, he retired to Ireland where he pursued his antiquarian studies. From about 1764 he began a correspondence with Charles O'Conor and had put together an impressive collection of Irish manuscripts.

=== The Book of Ballymote ===
In 1785, the Book of Ballymote was presented by the Chevalier O'Gorman to the Royal Irish Academy in Dublin, where it remained as one of the Academy's most treasured possessions. The book is written in Middle Gaelic, with some Latin and Ogham. It contains a history of the life of Saint Patrick, a copy of the Lebor Gabála Érenn, and various genealogies of clans and kings from Ulster, Leinster, Connaught, and Munster families.

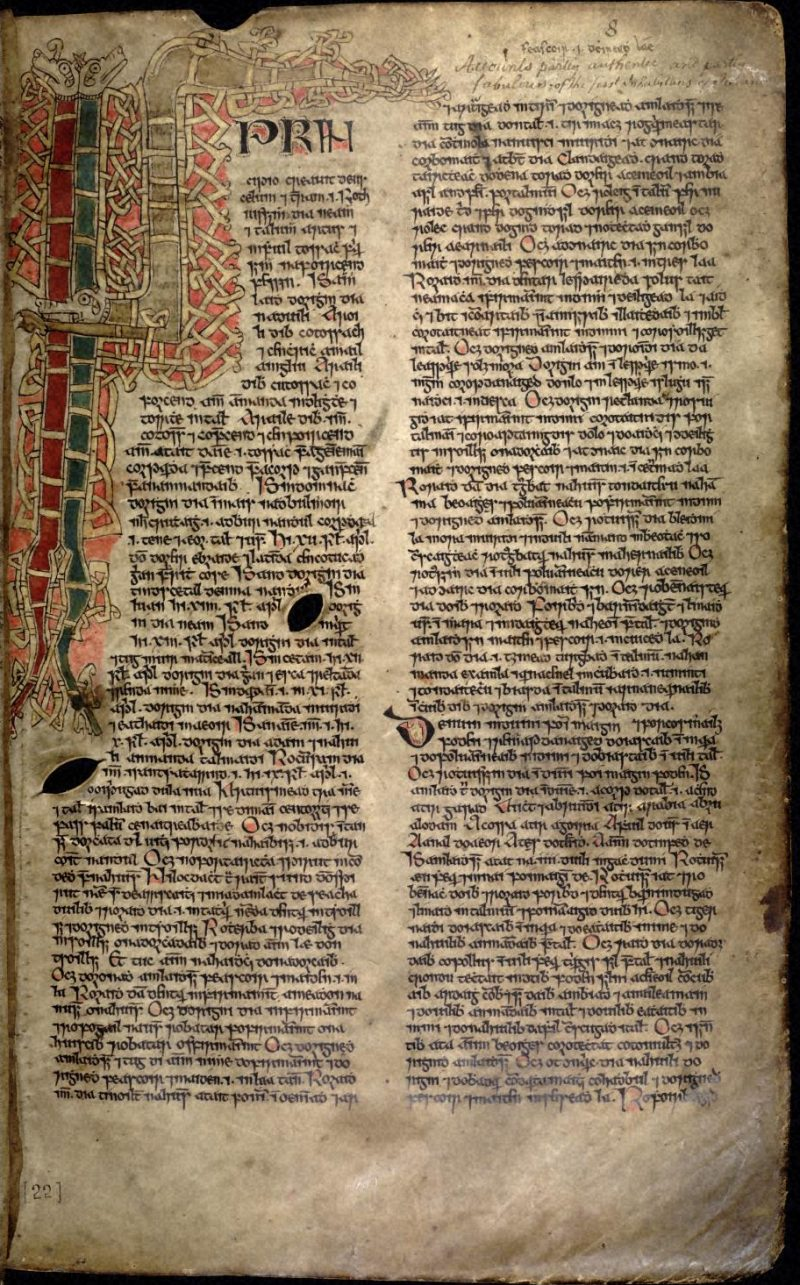
Picture from the Book of Ballymote

According to a somewhat dubious legend, O'Gorman received the Brian Boru Harp and gave it to Colonel William Burton Conyngham, who transferred it in Trinity College Dublin where it remains.

The Chevalier O'Gorman died in Drumellihy, near Doonbeg, County Clare on 18 November 1809. He is buried in Kilmacduane, Clare, Ireland in what was known as the ancient barony of Ibrickane, territory of the MacGorman.

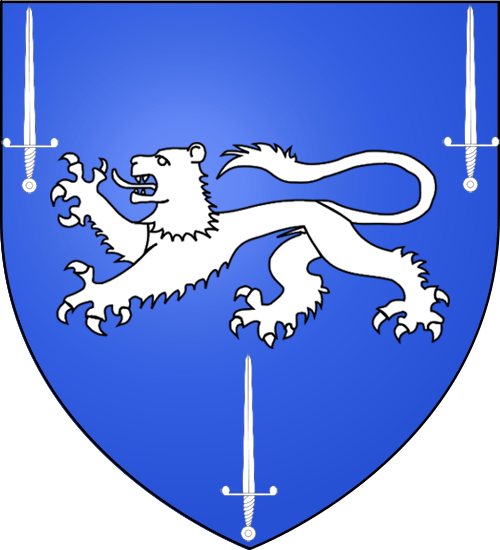
Arms of the Irish Clan MacGorman

== Honours ==
O'Gorman was created a Knight of the Order of Saint Louis by the king of France Louis XV.

== Publications ==
The Genealogy of the Very Ancient and Illustrious House of O'Reilly: Formerly Princes and Dynasts of Brefny O'Reilly, Now Called the County of Cavan in the Kingdom of Ireland par Thomas O'Gorman (Chevalier)

== See also ==
- MacGorman
- Jacobitism
- Irish Brigade (France)
- Wine Geese

== Bibliography ==
- François-Alexandre Aubert de La Chesnaye Des Bois, Dictionnaire de la noblesse, contenant les généalogies, l'histoire et la chronologie des familles nobles de France, Volume 13, 1783, p. 474
- The Literary Panorama, Volume 10, 1810, p. 1399
- John O'Donovan, 1589-1616. Appendix : pedigrees and histories of famous Irish families, 1856
- Louis Jourdan, Un Hermaphrodite ... [The history of C. G. L. A. A. T. d'Eon ... , 1861, P. 254
- James Frost, The History and Topography of the County of Clare : From the Earliest Times to the Beginning of the 18th Century, 1893, p. 144
- Richard Hayes, A Forgotten Irish Antiquary: Chevalier Thomas O'Gorman 1732-1809, 1941
- Michael C. O'Laughlin, The Families of County Clare, Ireland - Over One Thousand Entries from the Archives of the Irish Genealogical Foundation, 2000
- Patrick Clarke de Dromantin, Les réfugiés jacobites dans la France du XVIIIe siècle : l'exode de toute une noblesse pour cause de religion, Presses universitaires de Bordeaux, 2005, 525 pages, Collection « Voyages, migration et transferts culturels », (ISBN 978-2867813627)
- Maurice Lever et Évelyne Lever, Le Chevalier d'Éon : "Une vie sans queue ni tête", 2011
