= Château Tour de Marbuzet =

Coordinates: 45.23809°N 0.76718°W

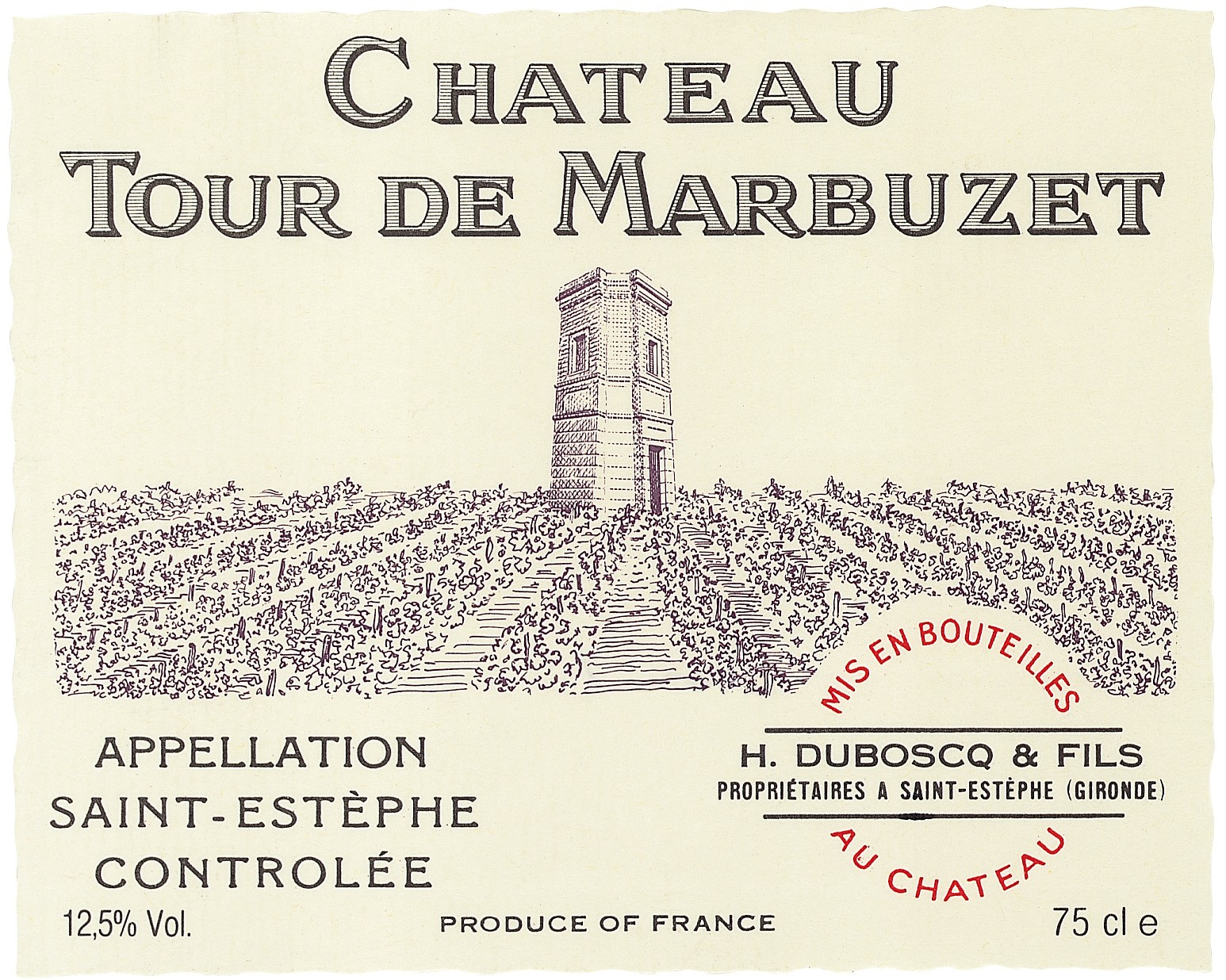
Tour-de-Marbuzet label

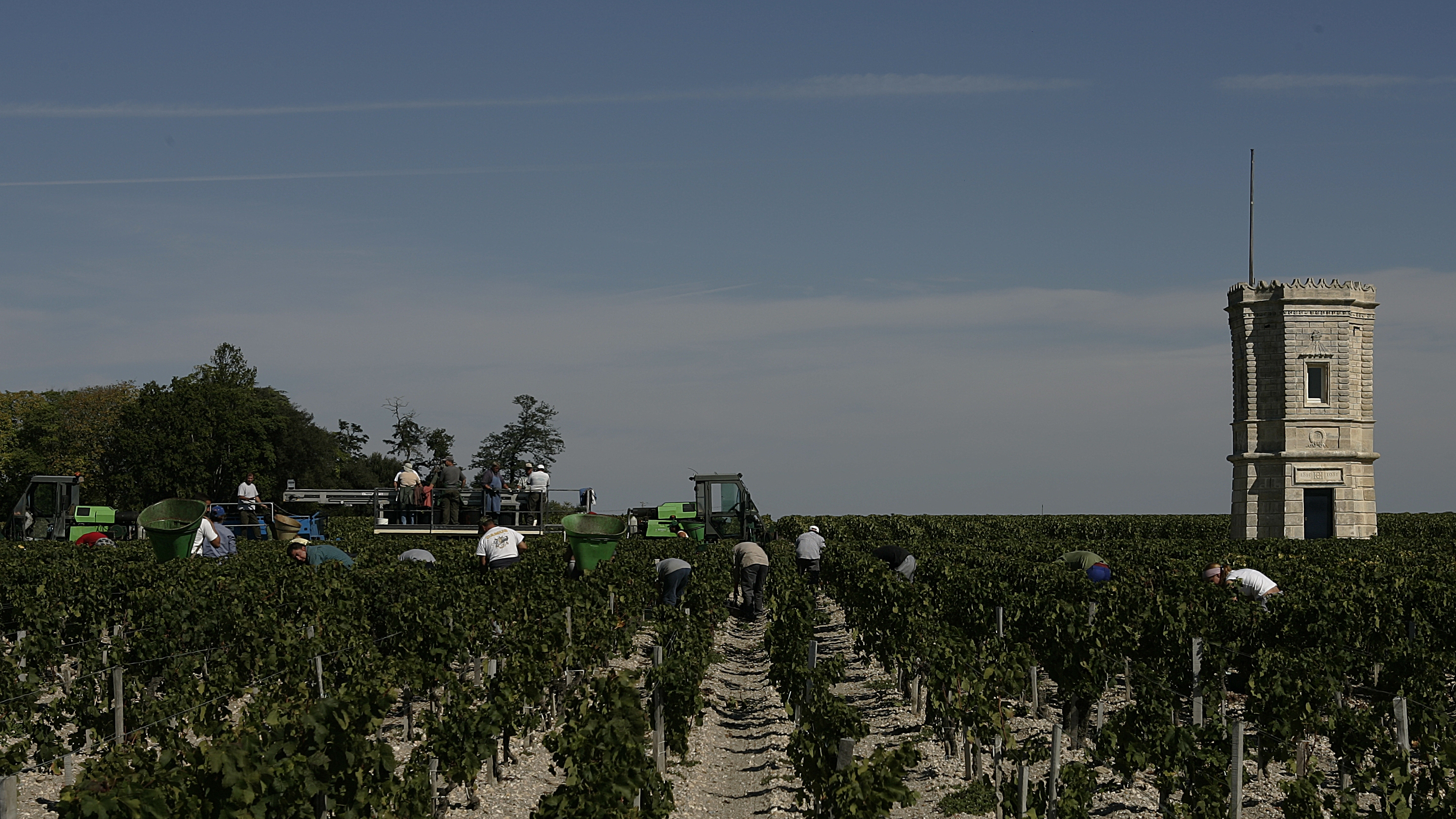
Harvesters at Tour-de-Marbuzet

Château Tour de Marbuzet is a Bordeaux wine estate in the appellation St.-Estèphe. It was originally part of the great Château MacCarthy estate, divided up and sold in 1854 to Mr Laurent Mathé, a renowned viticulturist of his time. In 1981, it was bought by Henri Duboscq, owner of Château Haut-Marbuzet.

Rated a Cru Bourgeois in 1932, Chateau Tour de Marbuzet was elevated to Cru Bourgeois Supérieur in the 2003 official listing.

== Production ==
Located on the plateau of La Peseille, in St.-Estephe, the vineyard has eastern exposure, close to the Gironde estuary. Its 4 hectares benefit from a superior terroir of deep gravels covering a clay and limestone subsoil. The vineyards are planted with 40% Merlot, 40% Cabernet Sauvignon and 20% Cabernet Franc.

Bordeaux's most traditional wine-making techniques are still implemented : hand harvest allowing a controlled selection of grapes, complete destalking, wild yeast fermentation, long maceration at high temperature, and daily pumping-overs. Then, the Tour de Marbuzet wine is stored one quarter in new barrels and three quarter in wooden vats. Until the bottling, it will be racked every 3 months.

Approximately 30,000 bottles are produced annually and exclusively distributed through the Groupe Duclot to restaurants, wine retailers as well as private customers.
