= Wine Geese =

Irish emigrants in the wine trade

The Wine Geese or Winegeese is a term used for Irish emigrants and exiles who established vineyards overseas, particularly in France. The term was coined in 2005 by Irish wine historian, Ted Murphy.

== History ==
In 1691, after a defeat in Williamite Wars, thousands of Irish soldiers left their country and relocated to Continental Europe and some of whom established notable businesses.

Among the notable winemakers who emigrated to France, include Skibbereen-born Abraham Lawton, Cork-born Richard Hennessy, and Fermanagh-born Thomas Barton who founded Château Langoa-Barton and Château Léoville Barton. Around fourteen châteaux of Irish-origin are operational in Bordeaux, France.

In Australia, they established Clare Valley wine region.

In 1990, a six-part television series, The Wine Geese, produced by Coco Television Production, was shown on the television.

== Notable wineries ==
- Hennessy, founded by Richard Hennessy
- Château Langoa-Barton
- Château Léoville Barton
- Château MacCarthy
- Château Lynch-Bages
- Château Kirwan
- Château Phélan Ségur
- Château Clarke
- Château Dillon
- Chateau de Fieuzal
