= Senator Gorham =

Senator Gorham may refer to:

- Benjamin Gorham (1775–1855), Massachusetts State Senate
- Bradford Gorham (1935–2015), Rhode Island State Senate
- Charles T. Gorham (1812–1901), Michigan State Senate

== See also ==
- Senator Gorman (disambiguation)
