= Senator Gorman (disambiguation) =

Arthur P. Gorman (1839–1906) was a U.S. senator from Maryland from 1881 to 1899 and from 1903 to 1906. Senator Gorman may also refer to:

- Arthur Pue Gorman Jr. (1873–1919), Maryland State Senate
- Bill Gorman (politician) (1920–2009), Florida State Senate
- James S. Gorman (1850–1923), Michigan State Senate
- Lee A. Gorman (1895–?), Michigan State Senate
- Pamela Gorman (fl. 2000s–2010s), Arizona State Senate

== See also ==
- Senator Gorham (disambiguation)
