= Dennis McCarthy =

Dennis McCarthy may refer to:

- Dennis McCarthy (scientist), American scientist
- Dennis McCarthy (composer) (born 1945), American composer
- Dennis McCarthy (politician) (1814–1886), United States congressman and acting lieutenant governor of New York
- Dennis McCarthy (radio presenter) (1933–1996), British radio presenter
- Denis Florence MacCarthy (1817–1882), Irish poet
- Dennis M. McCarthy (1945–2023), U.S. Marine Corps general
- Dennis McCarthy, shooting victim of Colin Ferguson
- Dennis McCarthy (1719–1796), Irish merchant settled in Bordeaux, owner of the Château MacCarthy in the Médoc wine region
