= Ghazzawi =

Ghazzawi (Arabic: غزّاوي, Ġazzāwī) is an Arabic surname meaning from Gaza. Notable people with the surname include:

- Abdel Hamid al-Ghazzawi, Libyan unlawfully detained in Guantanamo
- Esam Ghazzawi, Saudi businessman and advisor
- Izzat Ghazzawi, Palestinian writer
- Razan Ghazzawi, Syrian-American blogger and activist
- Gabi Ghazzawi, Jordanian Educator
