= List of Irish titular sees =

Prior to the Synod of Ráth Breasail the Catholic Church in Ireland did not have a diocesan system of governance. The reforming councils of the Church brought Ireland into line with the rest of the Church and established a diocesan system. Today twenty-six dioceses remain while others have been merged and still others have become extinct or used as titular sees.

== Titular dioceses ==
- Inis Cathaigh
- Ceanannus Mór
- Glendalough
- Slebte
- Cluain Iraird
