= Robert Gorman =

Robert Gorman may refer to:

- Robert A. Gorman (born 1937), American law professor at the University of Pennsylvania Law School
- Robert J. Gorman (1915–2007), Chicago attorney
- Robert N. Gorman (1896–1962), judge in the U.S. State of Ohio
- Robert Hy Gorman (born 1980), American actor
