= Château Haut-Marbuzet =

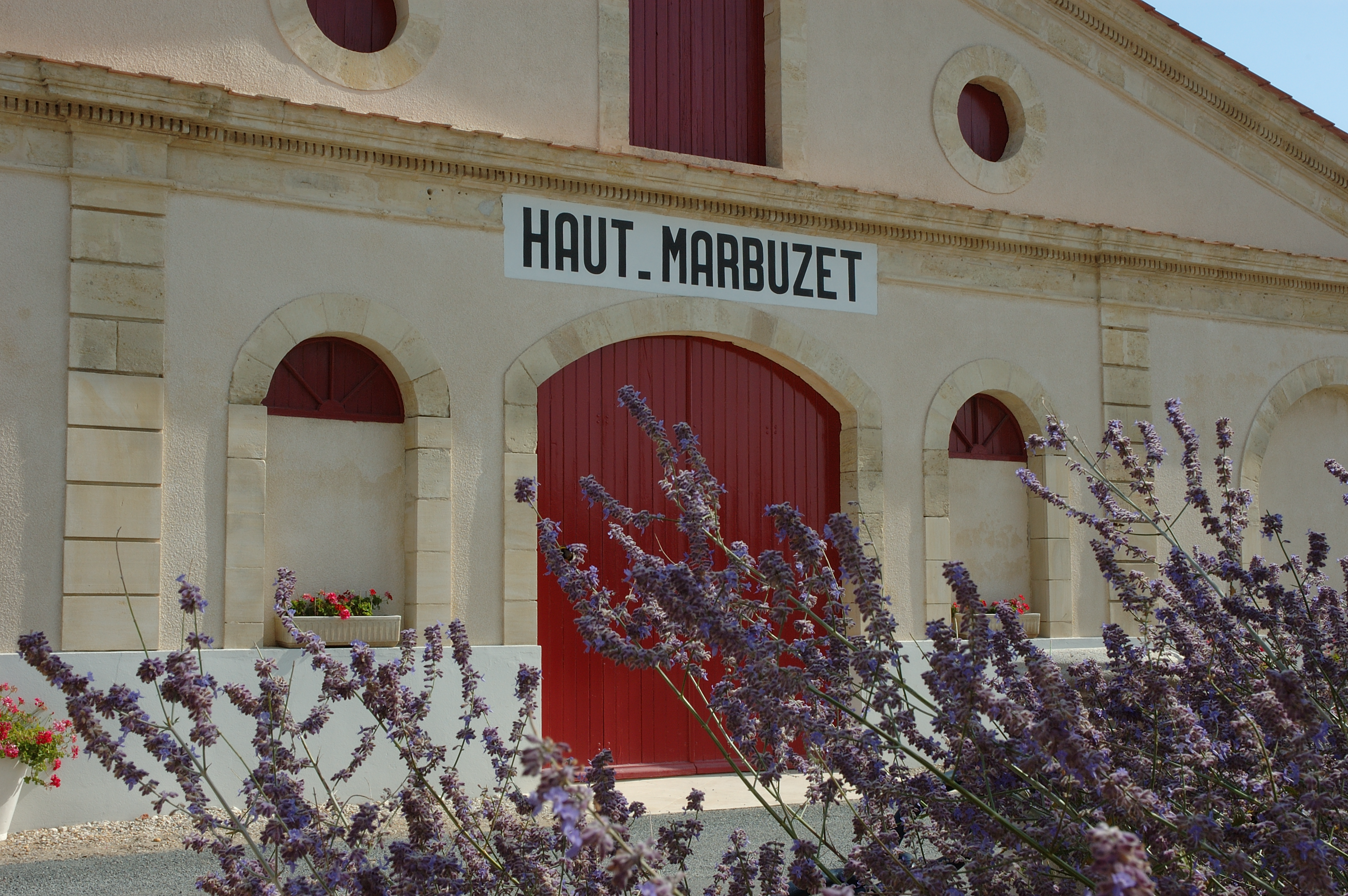
- Location: Saint-Estèphe, France
- Coordinates: 45.23816°N 0.76890°W
- Appellation: Saint-Estèphe AOC
- Other labels: Château Tour de Marbuzet Château Chambert-Marbuzet Château MacCarthy
- Key people: Henri Duboscq
- Varietals: Cabernet Sauvignon, Merlot, Cabernet Franc

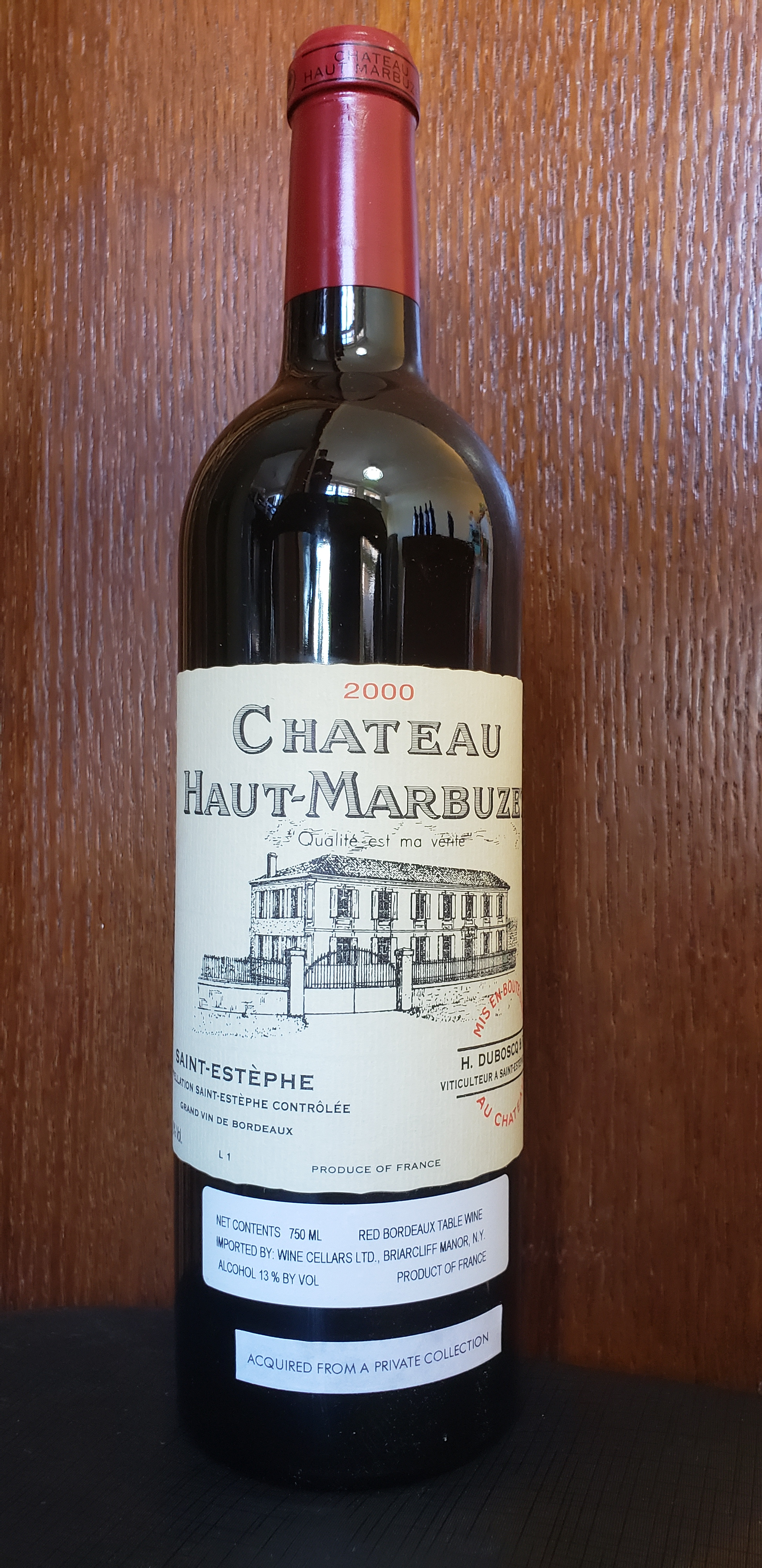
A bottle from 2000 vintage

Château Haut-Marbuzet (French pronunciation: [ʃɑto o maʁbyzɛ]) is a Bordeaux wine estate in the Saint-Estèphe appellation area of the Haut-Médoc.
Although its origins go back to the 18th century, the estate only emerged as a leading quality producer from 1952 after Hervé Duboscq acquired it.

Today, his son Henri Duboscq is the winemaker and owner of Haut-Marbuzet, along with Château Chambert-Marbuzet and Château Tour de Marbuzet.

Initially listed among the Cru Bourgeois in 1932, and later promoted Grand Bourgeois Exceptionnel in 1978, the estate was classified as one of 9 Crus Bourgeois Exceptionnels in the 2003 official listing. According to David Peppercorn, "Today, Haut-Marbuzet is widely considered of a cru classé status, well off the bottom rung".

== Production ==
Tucked between châteaux Cos d'Estournel and Montrose, the vineyard covers 61 hectares (150 acres) and is planted with 50% Cabernet Sauvignon, 40% Merlot, and 10% Cabernet Franc. Overlooking the Gironde estuary, it is mainly located on the gravel ridge of Marbuzet and the plateau of Long Treytin. The high proportion of merlot, rather unusual in traditional blendings, as well as a long maturing in new oak barrels, greatly contribute to the mellowness of the wine. Often described as exotic or opulent, Haut-Marbuzet wines develop a suppleness and an individual expressive character that are unusual in the normally austere style of Saint-Estèphe. Jay McInerney describes the wine's relationship to its neighbors as "if a bikini-clad Juliette Binoche crashed a meeting of the French Academy."

A second wine is produced from the vines under 12 years old, under the label Château MacCarthy, which bears the name of the Irish Jacobite family who created the vineyard.
