= Ceanannus Mór (titular see) =

The Diocese of Ceanannus Mór, once a residential episcopal see centred on Kells, County Meath, Ireland, is now a titular see of the Catholic Church.

The residential see was absorbed into the Diocese of Meath.

The first titular bishop of the see was appointed on 20 April 1970.

The Latin adjective referring to the diocese is Cenanensis.

== See also ==
Synod of Kells-Mellifont
