= Ted Murphy (historian) =

Irish wine historian (1935–2021)

Thaddeus J. Murphy, better known as Ted Murphy, (23 April 1935 – 13 April 2021) was an Irish wine historian and writer.

== Biography ==
Murphy was born on 23 April 1935, in Cork, Ireland. He was educated at the North Monastery Primary School and Christian Brothers Secondary School located in Cork.

In 2005, his book, A Kingdom of Wine: A Celebration of Ireland's Winegeese, was published. The book was selected for the World Gourmand Awards held in Beijing, China. He is also known for coining a term Wine Geese.

In 2007, University College Cork conferred him an honorary doctorate for his research work in wine history.

Murphy played an instrumental role in establishing International Museum of Wine at Desmond Castle.

== Bibliography ==
- A Kingdom of Wine: A Celebration of Ireland’s Winegeese (2005)
