= Abdel Hamid al-Ghizzawi =

Libyan Guantanamo detainee

Abdel Hamid Ibn Abdussalem Ibn Mifta Al Ghizzawi
- Born: August 11, 1962 (age 64); Tripoli, Libya
- Arrested: January 2002; Konar, Afghanistan; Afghan Intelligence Forces
- Released: March 23, 2010; Georgia
- Citizenship: Libyan
- Detained at: Guantanamo Bay detention camp
- ISN: 654
- Status: Released

Abdel Hamid Ibn Abdussalem Ibn Mifta Al Ghizzawi (عبدالحميد ابن عبدالسلام الغزاوي) (born 8 November 1962) is a citizen of Libya who was held from June 2002 until March 2010 in the Guantanamo Bay detention camp, in Cuba because the United States classified him as an enemy combatant. His internment number was 654.

His attorney has disputed the determination that al-Ghizzawi was an enemy combatant, which he has denied. She has noted that the first Combatant Status Review Tribunal in November 2004 found no evidence of al-Qaeda involvement and ruled he was not an enemy combatant. Lieutenant Colonel Stephen Abraham later submitted an affidavit to the United States Supreme Court about the flaws in the CSRT process, based in part on this case, for which he sat on the original tribunal.

A second tribunal was called in January 2005, 55 days later and with different members; it determined that al-Ghizzawi was an enemy combatant, claiming new "secret" information. His attorney found later that no new information had been introduced, and described the proceeding as a "kangaroo court" on behalf of the Bush administration at the time.

Al Ghizzawi's case was not heard by any other forum. He was never charged or tried by a military commission.

On 23 March 2010, the United States government released Al Ghizzawi from Guantanamo, transferring him to the custody of the nation of Georgia.

== Early life ==
Abdel Hamid Ibn Abdussalem Ibn Mifta Al Ghizzawi was born in Tripoli, Libya in 1962. He had training at the Ministry of Maritime Transport Trade School and the Abu Sitta Naval Training Center for five to six months in 1979–1980. Together with nearly 250 Libyan recruits, he was sent to the Kamaya Point Training Center in Bataan, Philippines, but the program failed and they returned to Libya.

From 1985 to 1987, he worked as an office assistant for the Libyan Civil Aviation Authority. In the late 1980s, he went to Pakistan for work, where he taught school for some time. He was in Afghanistan in 1988 during the Soviet–Afghan War, but said that he never participated in fighting. During this period, the United States supported the mujahideen in their resistance to the Soviets. Al-Ghizzawi received a few weeks' training in 1988–1989, but said he never fired a shot.

By September 2001, al-Ghizzawi had married an Afghan woman and lived in Jalalabad, Afghanistan. They had a daughter together.

== Capture and detention in Guantanamo ==
Al Ghizzawi's government file says he was arrested in January 2002 by Afghan Intelligence Forces in Konar, Afghanistan.

He has said that armed men came to his house, taking him away and selling him to Northern Alliance forces. They in turn sold him to the Americans, who were offering bounties for people to be picked up.

Al-Ghazzai was turned over to American forces and first held at Bagram for interrogation. He was transported to Guantanamo Bay detention camp in June 2002. Like other detainees, he was held in secrecy and for years deprived of any access to legal counsel and communication with his family.

As a result of the United States Supreme Court decision in Rasul v. Bush (2004), which said that detainees had the habeas corpus right to challenge detention in an impartial tribunal, such as federal court, the United States Department of Defense quickly created the Combatant Status Review Tribunals. Beginning weeks after the Supreme Court decision, DOD used the CSRTs to review each of the several hundred detainee case to determine whether detainees should be held as enemy combatants.

The Center for Policy and Research at Seton Hall University School of Law has prepared numerous reports about the Guantanamo Bay detention camp, the detainees, and the operations. In its review of the CSRTs, No-Hearing Hearings: CSRT: The Modern Habeas Corpus? (2006), the Center for Policy and Research found that all detainees were ultimately declared enemy combatants. In the few cases in which detainees were first cleared by their CSRTs as enemy combatants, second tribunals were called which overwhelmingly determined the detainees were enemy combatant. This resulted in hundreds of men being held without charges under harsh conditions at Guantanamo for years more. Among these was Al Ghizzawi, whose case was noted in the report, by his intern number.

At the CSRT for al-Ghizzawi, "On 24 November 2004, a ... Tribunal [unanimously] determined, by a preponderance of the evidence, that Detainee #654 was not properly designated as an enemy combatant." It found he had no al-Qaeda or Taliban involvement.

But, after the results went to Washington, DOD convened a second CSRT there 55 days later. It was held in Washington, with neither Al-Ghizzawi nor his Personal Representative present. "On 25 January 2005, this Tribunal, upon review of all the evidence, determined that detainee #654 was properly [unanimously] designated as an enemy combatant."

The transcripts of subsequent Administrative Review Board hearings show that al-Ghizzawi continued to deny involvement with al-Qaeda, and said he never fought in Afghanistan, nor against the Americans.

By the summer of 2006, H. Candace Gorman began working as Al Ghizzawi's pro bono attorney, a connection made by the Center for Constitutional Rights. She asked to review the CSRT files. Initially she was told the second CSRT had evaluated new, "secret" information as the basis for its revised finding that al-Ghizzawi was an enemy combatant. She had to travel to government offices to review the secret files. She found there was no new information; the second tribunal had simply overturned the conclusions of the first one.

Gorman submitted a habeas corpus petition to the United States Supreme Court on al-Ghizzawi's behalf in August 2006. All pending habeas corpus cases were stayed following passage of the Military Commissions Act of 2006 in October of that year, as it had provisions restricting their use by detainees considered to be enemy combatants or waiting for review of their cases, whose cases were to be heard under the system authorized by the legislation.

== Lieutenant Colonel Stephen Abraham's 2007 affidavit ==
Lieutenant Colonel Stephen Abraham, a reserve officer whose field was intelligence and who is a lawyer in civilian life, served with the Office for the Administrative Review of Detained Enemy Combatants. On 23 June 2007, he submitted an affidavit to the Supreme Court strongly criticizing the entire CSRT process and describing the one Combatant Status Review Tribunal on which he had served, which was that for detainee #654, or al-Ghizzawi.

Abraham was the first member of a military panel to challenge the conduct of the hearings. He said the panels were strongly pressured to rule that detainees were enemy combatants. His panel resisted pressure to change their determination and continued to find the detainee was not an enemy combatant. He was never asked to sit on another panel. His affidavit is believed to have contributed to the Supreme Court's decision to accept the consolidated cases of Boumediene v. Bush and Al-Odah v. United States for its 2007-2008 docket. It had originally declined to hear this case. In Boumediene v. Bush (2008), the Supreme Court found that detainees had the habeas corpus right for access to federal courts. It found that provisions of the Military Commissions Act of 2006 restricting them to the military system were unconstitutional. In addition, since the CSRTs had been completed in 2005, most detainees were still being held without charges; their cases had not progressed.

Attorneys refiled numerous habeas corpus petitions in federal courts on behalf of detainees to challenge their detention.

== Health ==
H. Candace Gorman, Al Ghizzawi's attorney, said that Guantanamo authorities had told her in October 2006 that the detainee had hepatitis B and tuberculosis, the latter contracted at the camp. In December 2007, Gorman alleged that Al Ghizzawi "has not been treated for his hepatitis or tuberculosis and has developed a severe liver infection", and characterized him as "dying a slow and painful death".

On 16 January 2008, Gorman reported on her blog that Al Ghizzawi told her he has AIDS. The Supreme Court denied her request for access to al-Ghizzawi's medical records, after she appealed DOD's denial. DOD has said that privacy restrictions prevent revealing details about an individual detainee's health, but a spokesman at Guantanamo said that no detainee at the camp has been diagnosed with HIV or AIDS.

== Detainee reviews ==
Beginning in early 2009, the Obama administration conducted reviews of all detainees held at Guantanamo with the goal of repatriating as many as possible or finding safe places for them, and closing the camps. It has arranged placement for numerous detainees to be released who feared returning to their country of origin. It arranged for Georgia to accept Al Ghizzawi and transferred him there on 23 March 2010.
