= Château Chambert-Marbuzet =

Wine estate in France

Coordinates: 45°14′15″N 0°45′58″W

- Wine region: Bordeaux
- Appellation: Saint-Estèphe
- Area cultivated: 5 hectares (12 acres)
- Cases/yr: 2,500
- Known for: Château Chambert-Marbuzet (Grand vin)
- Varietals: Cabernet Sauvignon, Merlot

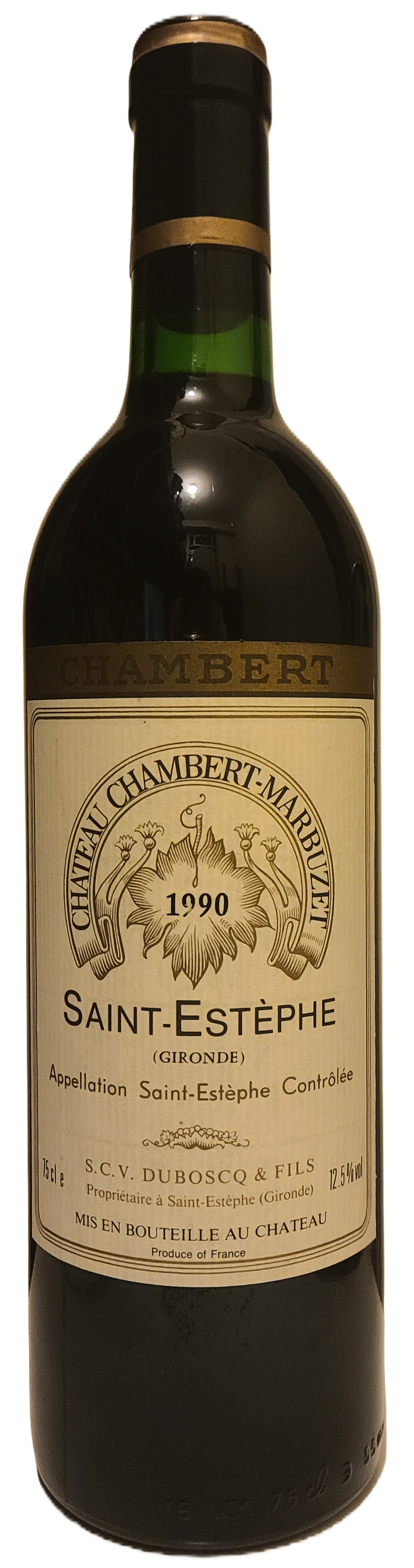
Grand vin 1990

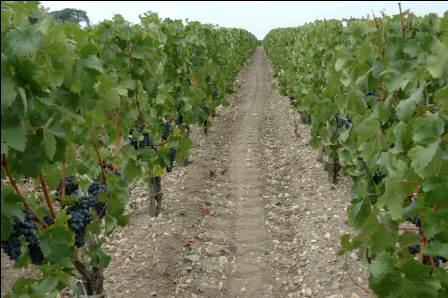
Alluvial gravels of St.-Estèphe

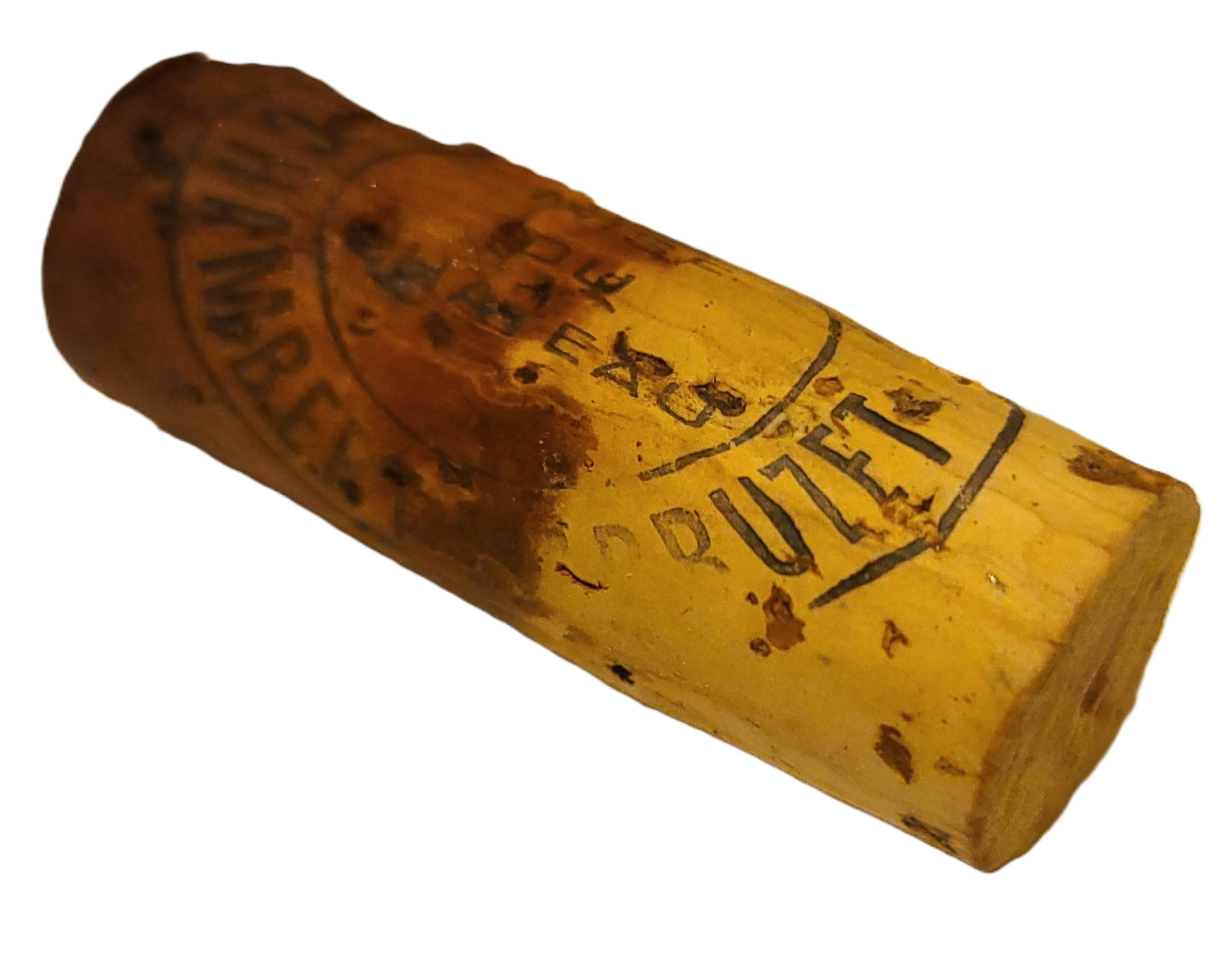
Cork

Château Chambert-Marbuzet is a Bordeaux wine estate of 5 hectares located in the St.-Estèphe appellation area. It belongs to the family of Henri Duboscq.

A Cru Bourgeois in 1932, Château Chambert-Marbuzet was elevated to the upper category of Cru Bourgeois Supérieur in 2003.

== Origins ==
The local name Chambert comes from an old agricultural tool used to dig trenches between the rows of vineyards. It was also the name of a family of wine growers living in the hamlet of Marbuzet during the 19th century.

In 1962, the vineyard and winery were bought by Hervé Duboscq, the founder of Château Haut-Marbuzet.

== Production ==
Located in the central southern area of St.-Estephe, on the plateaus of 'Le Bouscat' and 'Des Camots', this small vineyard benefits from a terroir of alluvial gravels resting on a clay and limestone base, as well as from a mild micro-climate thanks to the nearby Gironde estuary. Because of its limited size, the chateau only produces around 30,000 bottles per year. The usual blend is 70% Cabernet Sauvignon with 30% Merlot, which makes it a solid and classically full-bodied St.-Estèphe.
