= Blanquefort, Gironde =

Blanquefort
- Commune
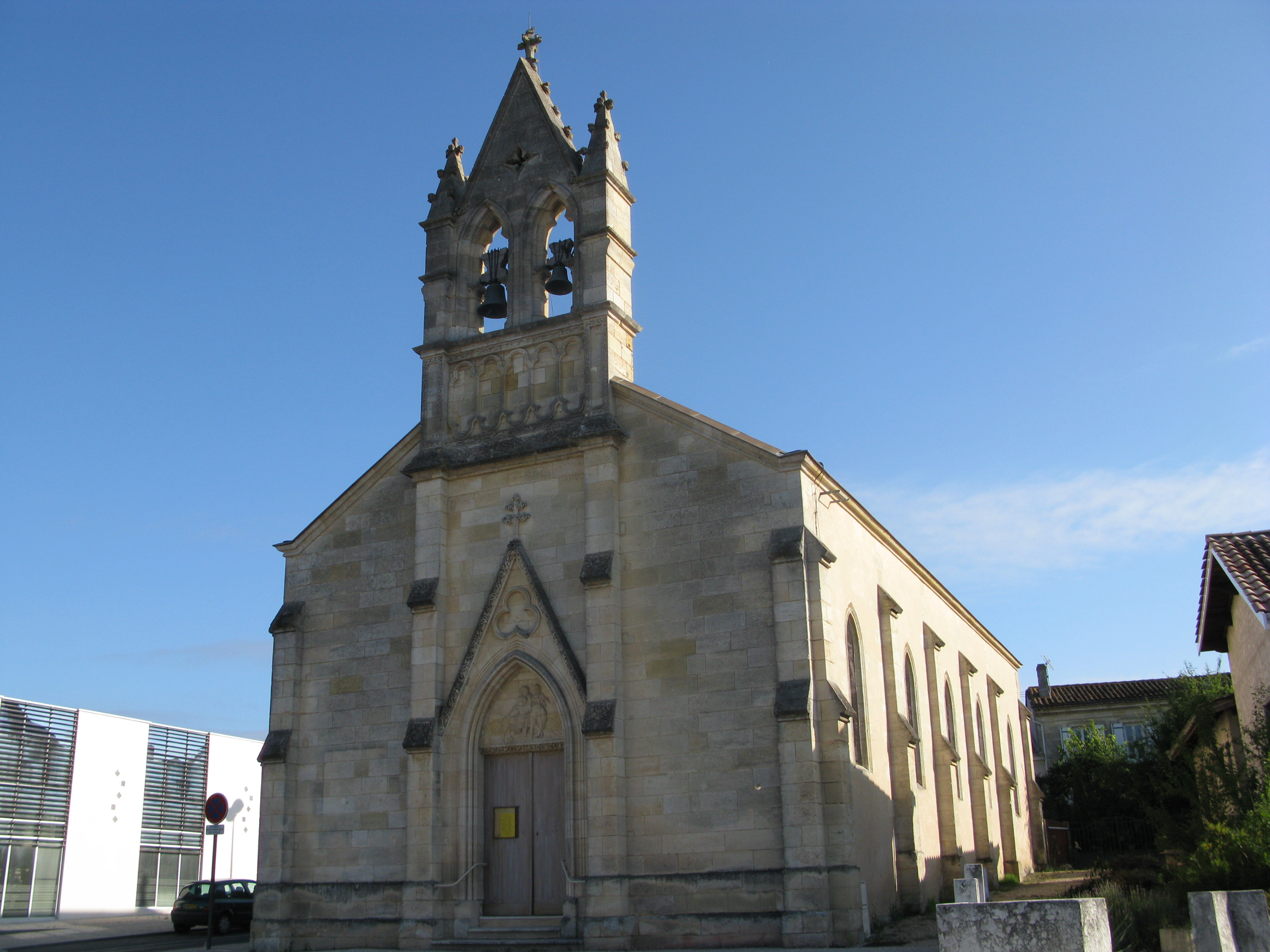
- The church in Caychac

- Coat of arms
- Location of Blanquefort
- Location within France Location within Nouvelle-Aquitaine
- Coordinates: 44°54′41″N 0°38′11″W
- Country: France
- Region: Nouvelle-Aquitaine
- Department: Gironde
- Arrondissement: Bordeaux
- Canton: Les Portes du Médoc
- Intercommunality: Bordeaux Métropole

Government
  - Mayor (2020–2026): Véronique Ferreira
- Area^{1}: 33.72 km^{2} (13.02 sq mi)
- Elevation: 17 m (56 ft)
- Highest elevation: 39 m (128 ft)
- Lowest elevation: 0 m (0 ft)
- Population (2023): 17,215
  - Density: 510.5/km^{2} (1,322/sq mi)
- Demonym: Blanquefortais
- Time zone: UTC+01:00 (CET)
  - Summer (DST): UTC+02:00 (CEST)
- INSEE/Postal code: 33056 /33290
- ^{1} French Land Register data, which excludes lakes, ponds, glaciers > 1 km^{2} (0.386 sq mi or 247 acres) and river estuaries.

Blanquefort (French pronunciation: [blɑ̃kfɔʁ]; Gascon: Blancahòrt) is a commune in the Gironde department in Nouvelle-Aquitaine in southwestern France. Blanquefort is an outlying commune of the Bordeaux metropolitan area.

The commune consists of historic Blanquefort and Caychac, which is further out from central Bordeaux and was formerly a commune in its own right. Historic Blanquefort includes the ruins of a small medieval fortress and a nineteenth-century park, the Parc de Majolan, complete with a maze-like grotto and small artificial ruins which were in vogue at that time.

Blanquefort is well connected to the rest of the agglomeration by the Bordeaux bus services, including services most of the night. It also has a train station with regular services to central Bordeaux. The Bordeaux tram system is projected to connect with Blanquefort in 2013.

Blanquefort, which is located in a famous wine-producing area, has a notable educational institution for viticulture.

== History ==
The oldest signs of human habitation in the commune are pieces of pottery dating back to 2000 BC. This is in line with the very early settlement of all south-western France by pre-historic peoples (e.g. in the Périgord).

A Roman military post was set up in the area, to ensure the security of the road to Noviomagus in the Medoc. Tiles and coins from the Roman occupation have been found around the site of the later fortress.

In the ninth century, a first medieval fortification was built. The white stone gave the fort the name "White Fort", in Latin Blanca Fortis, which evolved into the modern name Blanquefort. During the Plantagenet holding of Aquitaine, the fortifications were expanded into a royal fortress at the end of the thirteenth century by Edward I of England. At the end of the Hundred Years War, the fortress became French. A wine-producing village grew around the fortifications, probably worked predominantly by serfs.

Blanquefort is located in a region which has been notable for wine production since ancient times. During the seventeenth and eighteenth centuries, a number of small chateaux were constructed in the prosperous village by wealthy wine merchants. The economy of the village focussed on wine production. In the seventeenth century, the Château Dillon was built in Blanquefort by the Dillon family which migrated to Blanquefort from Ireland.

During the French Revolution, as part of the central Gironde, the village was loosely connected with the conflict between Gironde deputies and Jacobins in the national government. As with the other nearby areas, the village would probably have supported a moderate course for the revolution and there was probably support for the federalist constitutional proposals which were popular in Bordeaux. The village was well within the territory of the federalist insurrection of 1793. Unfortunately, no historical records exist which discuss the politics of the village during revolution.

In 1900, the population was 2000. From the beginning of the twentieth century, the reliance of the village economy on wine production became a problem as economic crises took their toll. In 1962, the now-impoverished village created an industrial zone on former marshland. Combined with its proximity to Bordeaux, this led to a rapid growth of the village, which was now becoming a suburb of expanding Bordeaux.

In the early twenty-first century, as a result of Bordeaux's continuing expansion, new developments have been built to allow the population of Blanquefort to grow further.

== Population ==
Historical population

Year	Pop.	±% p.a.
1793	2,080	—
1800	2,003	−0.54%
1806	1,747	−2.25%
1821	1,971	+0.81%
1831	2,074	+0.51%
1836	2,052	−0.21%
1841	1,995	−0.56%
1846	2,175	+1.74%
1851	2,274	+0.89%
1856	2,325	+0.44%
1861	2,498	+1.45%
1866	2,727	+1.77%
1872	2,747	+0.12%
1876	2,747	+0.00%
1881	2,879	+0.94%
1886	3,032	+1.04%
1891	3,004	−0.19%
1896	2,957	−0.31%
1901	2,838	−0.82%

Year	Pop.	±% p.a.
1906	2,653	−1.34%
1911	2,641	−0.09%
1921	2,448	−0.76%
1926	2,576	+1.02%
1931	2,636	+0.46%
1936	2,715	+0.59%
1946	3,685	+3.10%
1954	4,362	+2.13%
1962	4,017	−1.02%
1968	4,671	+2.55%
1975	6,918	+5.77%
1982	9,972	+5.36%
1990	12,843	+3.21%
1999	13,901	+0.88%
2007	15,113	+1.05%
2012	15,149	+0.05%
2017	15,833	+0.89%
2023	17,215	+1.40%

Source: EHESS and INSEE (1968-2023)

== Economy ==
Since 1972, Blanquefort has been the location of a Ford transmission plant, which occupies a 103 ha site in the industrial zone. The plant was the result of an investment of 600 mIllion French francs, expected to generate 2,000 jobs. Initially, it was built to manufacture Ford C3 automatic transmission units for Ford's European models, with engine sizes from 1300 cc to 3000 cc. Despite recent reports that the plant has been sold by Ford in response to their need for money, it will continue for now to supply transmissions to the company.

== See also ==
- Haut-Médoc AOC
- Communes of the Gironde department
