= H. Candace Gorman =

American lawyer

- Education: University of Wisconsin; University of Illinois Chicago School of Law (JD)
- Occupation: Civil rights attorney

H. Candace Gorman is a Chicago-based civil-rights attorney, known for representing two Guantanamo Bay detainees and also for her work to uncover secret "street files" maintained by the Chicago Police.

== Education and personal life ==
Gorman grew up on the South Side of Chicago and attended the University of Wisconsin, where she majored in philosophy. Like her father, Chicago civil-rights attorney Robert J. Gorman, she attended law school, receiving her JD in 1983 from the UIC John Marshall Law School.

After finishing law school, Gorman began a solo general law practice, and ten years later, she limited her practice to civil rights law. In 2008 and 2009, she spent time living in the Netherlands working as a visiting professional for the International Criminal Court in The Hague.

Gorman's husband Chris Ross is a demographer. They have three children.

== Donnelley discrimination case and statute of limitations ==
Gorman was plaintiff lawyer in a discrimination case filed against Chicago-based printing company RR Donnelley that she took to the Supreme Court. According to The Wall Street Journal:

The lawsuit against Donnelley, which was filed in U.S. District Court in Chicago in November [1996], claims that African-Americans were discriminated against when Donnelley closed a Chicago printing plant in 1994 that employed 1,000 people [...] Plaintiffs attorney H. Candace Gorman said the company's statistical records clearly show discriminatory employment patterns. She cited personnel records showing that after Donnelley closed the 1,000-employee printing plant in Chicago, transferring some employees to other locations, only 1.2% of those who received transfers were black, compared with 30% of white workers.

Gorman told the Associated Press that in many cases black workers with seniority were fired while less-experienced white workers were kept on: "In fact, some of my clients had to go to facilities to help train these younger employees in how to work the machinery."

Soon after filing the case on behalf of workers from the shut-down plant, Gorman expanded it to a class action suit on behalf of Donnelley black employees nationwide, more than 500 workers from 60 or more different locations, claiming "a long-term pattern of racial discrimination and harassment" and presenting evidence including racial and sexual jokes shared in company emails.

Donnelley responded that displaced workers had missed the two-year statute of limitations to file their claim, a contention that was upheld by the 7th U.S. Circuit Court of Appeals in September 2002. Gorman appealed that decision to the US Supreme Court, which ruled unanimously in her favor in May 2004.

In 2012, Gorman told an interviewer that she was surprised by the Supreme Court's unanimous verdict after the "harsh" questions she got from Justice Antonin Scalia, saying:

I counted him as a “no” vote. I later learned that Justice Stevens--who wrote the opinion changing the statute of limitations in §1981 cases to four years across the country instead of the personal injury statute in each state--thought it was very important for procedural issue decisions to be unanimous so they negotiated around Scalia’s concerns.

The result, according to the Chicago Tribune, was "a $15 million settlement of a racial discrimination suit against R.R. Donnelley Co., the Chicago-based commercial printing company, on behalf of some 600 African-American employees [...] Donnelley settled after the U.S. Supreme Court agreed with Gorman that the statute of limitations in civil rights cases should be extended from two years to four."

== Guantanamo Bay detainees and habeas corpus ==
After learning, in October 2005, that more than 200 prisoners in the Guantanamo Bay detainment camp had no lawyers, Gorman volunteered to represent one detainee. A few months later, she agreed to represent a second, in both cases pro bono. The Center for Constitutional Rights, which provides pro bono lawyers for the Guantanamo detainees, connected her to two clients: Abdel Hamid Ibn Abdussalem Ibn Mifta Al Ghazzawi and Abdal Ali Razak.

Gorman told northern Michigan newspaper Northern Express that she represents both men as a civil rights lawyer, seeking a fair trial for them based on the right of habeas corpus, the right for a prisoner to know the evidence against them and to request a fair trial based on that evidence. At the time, there was debate whether people suspected of war crimes could be excluded from habeas corpus. Ron Suskind wrote about this in his 2008 book The Way of the World, detailing Gorman's first meeting with al-Ghazzawi and her goals for representing him.

After her first meeting with al-Ghazzawi, a Libyan who had been running a bakery in Afghanistan when neighbors denounced him as a terrorist, she was struck by his bad health. In addition to trying to move his case toward a trial, she sought medical care for him and access to his health records, but was refused on all counts. Eventually, he was one of three Guantanamo prisoners who was transferred to the custody of the nation of Georgia on March 23, 2010.

Her second client, Abdal Ali Razak, also known as Razak Ali or Abdelrazak Ali Abdelrahman, was an Algerian citizen visiting Pakistan, detained because he was staying in the same guest house as Abu Zubaydah, who was believed to be a top Al-Qaeda figure. Although Gorman has filed several habeas corpus petitions on his behalf, including Ali v. Obama (2013) and Ali v. Trump (2018), they have so far been unsuccessful. Ali is one of 40 prisoners still remaining in the Guantanamo prison, according to the New York Times, which notes that he is held in "Indefinite Law-of-War Detention" and not recommended for transfer.

== Investigating Chicago Police Department "street files" ==
In 2014, Gorman sought and received a judge's permission to examine the content of multiple police file cabinets, in order to compare these files to the material given to defendants' lawyers. Based on the Supreme Court case Brady v. Maryland (1963), it is illegal for the state to hide from a defendant any exculpatory evidence (evidence that supports the defendant's innocence.)

Chicago's hidden "street files" first became known during a 1983 murder trial, when Chicago Police Detective Frank Laverty revealed that police routinely withheld evidence that could help defendants. According to a Chicago police commander at the time, testifying under oath, "it was standard procedure for detectives to maintain a secret file--the street file--that included reports and documents that might damage the case against their chosen suspect." Therefore, in 1983, according to the Chicago Tribune, "police issued a new general order doing away with street files and instituting what are called general progress reports in which detectives' notes and other updates on the investigation are typed into a form that is inventoried and subject to subpoena."

Nevertheless, more than two decades later, Gorman began a process of discovery that revealed thousands of files on homicide investigations going back to 1944 were still being kept in hidden file cabinets that police could access but defendants were never told about.

Gorman became aware of the files when she represented Nathson E. Fields (an exonerated death row prisoner) in three federal lawsuits against the City of Chicago and several of its police officers for fabricating evidence against Fields while hiding exonerating evidence in "street files".

Fields and Gorman filed the first lawsuit October 27, 2010. This ended in a mistrial due to misbehavior by a defendant, with the judge assessing defendants $70,000 to cover legal fees for Gorman. The second trial resulted in an award to Fields of only $80,000. Gorman sought and was granted a mistrial, citing evidence that two of the defendants had colluded to have Fields's main accuser released from prison early as a reward for his testimony against Fields.

It was in response to Gorman's appeals, filed after the second trial, that Judge Matthew Kennelly made what the Chicago Tribune described as a "potentially bombshell decision," allowing Gorman full access not only to files related to her current case but also to other file cabinets and boxes containing papers retained by police from other cases. Gorman alleged, and Kennelly agreed, that it was relevant to the Fields trial whether or not "the burying of street files was a de facto policy of the Police Department."

Gorman, with a small team of attorneys, began to read through homicide files from about 500 cases that had been stored in a police-station basement, 23 file cabinets full. After comparing, for about 60 cases, material in these police files to the material given to homicide defendants, Gorman said that "more than 90 percent have information in the street file that was not in the defense file [...] including names and accounts of eyewitnesses that apparently were never disclosed, statements in detectives' notes that contradict later versions of typed reports and lineup cards that were missing or different from what the defense eventually saw."

In the third trial, Gorman was joined by attorneys from another Chicago firm. Together they secured an $11M verdict against the City of Chicago, based largely on evidence Gorman assembled from the 23 file cabinets, that Chicago Police had an "established custom" of hiding evidence from defense attorneys. Fields and Gorman were both featured in a July 7, 2019 episode of CNN's docu-drama series Death Row Stories, which included their "alleging that two Chicago police detectives falsified incriminating evidence and concealed favorable evidence."

Gorman also shared the evidence from old street files with other lawyers who worked on related cases. In at least one case, a prisoner's conviction was reversed based on new evidence that was uncovered.

Gorman, representing the mother of police-shooting victim Divonte Young in a 2018 lawsuit against Chicago, said that the pattern of withholding evidence continues.
