= Coorlaghan Ringfort =

Ringfort in County Laois, Ireland

- Ráth an Chuair Leathain (Irish)
- Location within Ireland
- 52.837357°N 7.010860°W
- Type: rath
- Location: Coorlaghan, Killeshin, County Laois, Ireland

Site notes
- Material: earth
- Area: 6,600 m^{2} (71,000 sq ft)
- Diameter: 92 m (302 ft)

Designations
- Designation: National Monument

National monument of Ireland
- Official name: Coorlaghan
- Reference no.: 557

Coorlaghan Ringfort (/kuːˈlɑːn/ or /-ˈlæn/) is a ringfort (rath) and National Monument located in County Laois, Ireland.

== Location ==
Coorlaghan Ringfort is located in the Barrow valley, 2 km southwest of Killeshin village, and 6 km west of Carlow town.

== History ==
The OS namebooks mention "there is a large Danish fort near the east boundary" of Coorlaghan townland. "Danish" is used here to refer to Viking settlement, although most ringforts were built and used by Gaelic Irish.
