= Paul Gorman (disambiguation) =

Paul Gorman is an English writer.

Paul Gorman may also refer to:

- Paul Gorman (footballer, born 1963), Irish football player
- Paul Gorman (footballer, born 1968), English football player
- Paul F. Gorman (1927–2026), United States Army general
- Paul A. Gorman (1907–1996), American business executive
