= Áed of Sletty =

Áed of Sletty was a Gaelic Irish Bishop and anchorite, fl. late 7th century.

== Biography ==
Áed was a member of the Uí Bairrche. He was bishop of Sletty, County Laois, and patron of Muirchu Maccu Machteni, who at Áed's request wrote a life of Saint Patrick, which is contained in the Book of Armagh.

Áed is also responsible for making a grant of his familia of churches to Armagh, his bishopric consisting of central and southern Leinster. The reasons for his doing so are unclear. He is believed to have sought protection from the encroaching claims of Kildare. He had made the grant before 688 to Ségéne of Armagh. Charles-Thomas (p. 262) writes: "Sleaty ... was in the vassal kingdom of Uí Bairrche Tíre, and the likelihood is that the Uí Dúnlainge, who had recently made themselves masters and patrons of Kildare, seemed to Áed to be in a position to threaten the independence of Sletty. He therefore subjected his church to the distant Armagh in the hope that Armagh's authority would be much less burdensome than Kildare's might have been. In this case, therefore, the subjection was defensive not offensive, and was effected by a legal instrument rather than by violence."
