= Uí Bairrche =

Irish kin-based group

Locations of various kin groups, circa 1100.

Uí Bairrche (Modern Irish: Uí Bhairrche, pronounced [iː ˈwaːɾˠəçə]) was an Irish kin-based group that originally held lands in the south of the ancient province of Leinster (or Cóiced Laigen "the Fifth of the Laigin"). Another south Leinster kin group associated with the Uí Bairrche were groups of the Fothairt. The south of Leinster was dominated by the Uí Chennselaig in the 8th century. Uí Bairrche held lands around Carlow, however Uí Chennselaig expansion split the kindred. The result was that one Uí Bairrche branch persevered in the Barrow valley; and another was forced to move south towards the Wexford coast.

== History ==
Following the medieval genealogies, the Uí Bairrche descend from Dáire Barrach, a son of Cathair Mór, and are thus of Laigin origins. T. F. O'Rahilly, however, believed them to have originally belonged to the Érainn, being descendants of an ancestor figure Dáire (*Dārios), and the historical representatives of the Brigantes, who are located in Co. Wexford in Claudius Ptolemy's Geography.

Genealogies for the Uí Baircche are recorded in Rawlinson B 502, fos. 121–122. Among the monasteries in Leinster controlled by the Uí Bairrche are Cell Auxili, Slébte (Sletty), Glenn Uissen (now Killeshin), Banba Mór, Cell Mo Lappóc and Tech Mo Shacro.

== See also ==
- List of Celtic tribes
- Tigernach of Clones
- Áed of Sletty
- Saint Fiacc
- Pre-Norman invasion Irish Celtic kinship groups, from whom many of the modern Irish surnames came from

== General references ==
=== Secondary sources ===
- O'Rahilly, T. F. O'Rahilly (1946). Early Irish History and Mythology. Dublin Institute for Advanced Studies.
- Ó Corráin, Donnchadh (1998). "Creating the Past: the Early Irish Genealogical Tradition". Peritia. 12: 177–208. doi:10.1484/j.peri.3.329.

=== Primary sources ===
- O'Brien, Michael A., ed. (1962). Corpus Genealogiarum Hiberniae. Vol. 1. Kelleher, John V. (intro. in the reprints of 1976 and 2005). Dublin: DIAS. pp. 46-54 (Rawlinson B 502). ISBN 0901282316. OCLC 56540733.
