= Thomas Gorman =

Thomas or Tom Gorman may refer to:

- Thomas Kiely Gorman (1892–1980), Roman Catholic bishop of Dallas
- Tom Gorman (American football) (1910–1975), American football player and coach
- Tom Gorman (rugby league) (1901–1978), Australian rugby league player
- Tom Gorman (tennis) (born 1946), American tennis player
- Tommie Gorman (1956–2024), Irish journalist
- Tommy Gorman (1886–1961), Canadian lacrosse player and founder of the National Hockey League (NHL)

== Baseball ==
- Tom Gorman (1980s pitcher) (born 1957), American baseball relief pitcher
- Tom Gorman (right-handed pitcher) (1925–1992), American baseball relief pitcher
- Tom Gorman (umpire) (1919–1986), American baseball pitcher and umpire

== See also ==
- Gorman Thomas (born 1950), American former professional baseball player
