= Stephen Abraham =

American lawyer and officer

Stephen Abraham is an American lawyer and officer in the United States Army Reserve. In June 2007, he became the first officer who had served on a Combatant Status Review Tribunal to publicly criticize its operations. He said the evidence provided did not meet legal standard, and the members of the panels were strongly pressured by superiors to find that detainees should be classified as enemy combatants. Abraham served in the Office for the Administrative Review of the Detention of Enemy Combatants.

== Civilian career ==
Abraham currently works for the Law Offices of Stephen Abraham in Newport Beach, California.

== Military career ==
Abraham was commissioned as an officer in the Intelligence Corps in 1981. He served as an intelligence officer during periods of both reserve and active duty, including mobilization in 1990 ("Operation Desert Storm") and twice again following the 9/11 attacks. The Boston Globe noted he had worked in intelligence. As of June 23, 2007, he is a lieutenant colonel.

Abraham served with the Office for the Administrative Review of the Detention of Enemy Combatants (OARDEC) from September 2004 through March 2005, both in fact gathering and as a panel member. The Combatant Status Review Tribunals, created to assess the individual detention of each of the 558 captives then present at Guantanamo Bay detention camp, lasted from August 2004 through January 2005. The confirmation of the panels' results, by then Secretary of the Navy Gordon R. England, was finished in March 2005.

== Abraham's affidavit ==
CBS quoted from an affidavit Abraham provided for a habeas corpus appeal on behalf of Fawzi al-Odah, a detainee at Guantanamo Bay detention camp: He said

What were purported to be specific statements of fact lacked even the most fundamental earmarks of objectively credible evidence.

He criticized that the CSRTs allowed hearsay evidence, which is not admitted in a court of law. He said it was as if the Guantanamo captives faced "a game of telephone".

He noted the poor preparation of the staff who prepared the files, most of whom had little or no training in intelligence, and little means to evaluate the data they were reviewing. He said,

It was well known by the officers in OARDEC that any time a CSRT panel determined that a detainee was not properly classified as an enemy combatant, the panel members would have to explain their finding to the OARDEC Deputy Director. There would be intensive scrutiny of the finding by Rear Admiral McGarrah who would, in turn, have to explain the finding to his superiors, including the Under Secretary of the Navy.

According to the Washington Post, Abraham felt compelled to make his criticisms public after having heard his former boss, Rear Admiral James M. McGarrah, describe the Tribunal process "fair".

Fawzi al-Odah was one of many detainees challenging his detention due to dissatisfaction with the CSRT process. Detainees had not been provided with legal counsel or given the opportunity to challenge any evidence presented by the government, which could include hearsay and secret, classified information not available to detainees. His was one of several cases consolidated under Boumediene v. Bush, which in 2007 was proceeding to the United States Supreme Court to challenge CSRTs, as well as the military commissions as created under the Military Commissions Act of 2006.

Abraham's sister had attended a presentation by al-Odah's attorneys about the detainee and the legal issues he and others faced. After she told them that her brother had been a Tribunal officer, they approached Abraham to find out what he thought of the process. Learning of his deep concerns, they asked if he would provide an affidavit. The Department of Defense keeps the identities of the Tribunal officers a secret. Soon after Abraham submitted his affidavit to the Supreme Court, it changed its previous decision and decided to accept Boumediene v. Bush for the 2007-2008 docket.

During a telephone interview with CBS News, Abraham defended having made the affidavit:

- I pointed out nothing less than facts, facts that can and should be fixed.
- I take very seriously my responsibility, my duties as a citizen.

Paraphrasing Abraham, the Associated Press reported:

Abraham was asked to serve on one of the panels, and he said its members felt strong pressure to find against the detainee, saying there was "intensive scrutiny" when they declared a prisoner not to be an enemy combatant. When his panel decided the detainee wasn't an "enemy combatant," they were ordered to reconvene to hear more evidence, he said. Ultimately, his panel held its ground, and he was never asked to participate in another tribunal, he said.

The Washington Post reports:

He said he and two fellow panel members were closely questioned by McGarrah and his deputy after they decided that there was not enough evidence to conclude that a prisoner was an enemy fighter, and were then ordered to hold an expanded hearing to reconsider their conclusion.

The Boston Globe reports that more senior OARDEC officials met with the Tribunal members to determine "what went wrong" with the case, after they declined to confirm the captive's "enemy combatant" status during their second, extraordinary Tribunal session.

David Cynamon, one of al-Odah's lawyers, praised Abraham's courage in making the affidavit. He expressed his fears that it was "career suicide" for Abraham.

Lt. Cmdr. Chito Peppler, responded to the affidavit by claiming that the Office for the Administrative Review of Detained Enemy Combatant:

...procedures afford greater protection for wartime status determinations than any nation has ever before provided.

Peppler also said:

Lt. Col. Abraham provides his opinion and perspective on the CSRT process. We disagree with his characterizations. Lt. Col. Abraham was not in a position to have a complete view of the CSRT process.

The Washington Post quotes officials, who asked for anonymity, who claimed Abraham never raised his concerns with McGarrah, a fact which Abraham disputes.

According to the Boston Globe, after Abraham sat on a Tribunal, he was assigned to serve as a liaison officer with the JTF-GTMO teams who were compiling the allegations against the captives for the Tribunals. They report that Abraham characterized the JTF-GTMO teams he worked with as:

...relatively junior officers with little training or experience in matters relating to the collection, processing, analyzing and/or dissemination of intelligence material.

== A second OARDEC officer comes forward ==
On October 5, 2007 the lawyers for Adel Hassan Hamad, whose case was consolidated under Boumediene v. Bush, filed an affidavit from a second officer who had served with OARDEC. Like Abraham, this second officer, whose name was redacted from the Supreme Court documents, was also a reservist and an attorney in civilian life. He wrote: "training was minimal" -and- "the process was not well defined". Abraham was allowed to sit on only one Tribunal. The second officer sat on 49 Tribunals.

== Interviews ==
Abraham agreed to numerous interviews following reporting on his affidavit. Abraham said that most of his work, and that of his colleagues on the Tribunals, was performed in Washington, DC. He traveled to Guantanamo only three times. Abraham said that the allegations in the Summary of Evidence memos were referred to as "evidence", but they did not meet the legal standard for evidence.
