= Aghnahily Ringfort =

Ringfort in County Laois, Ireland

- Ráth Achadh na hAidhle (Irish)
- Rahenhoylley, Aghanaheily, Aughenahilie, Aghabahile, Aughnally
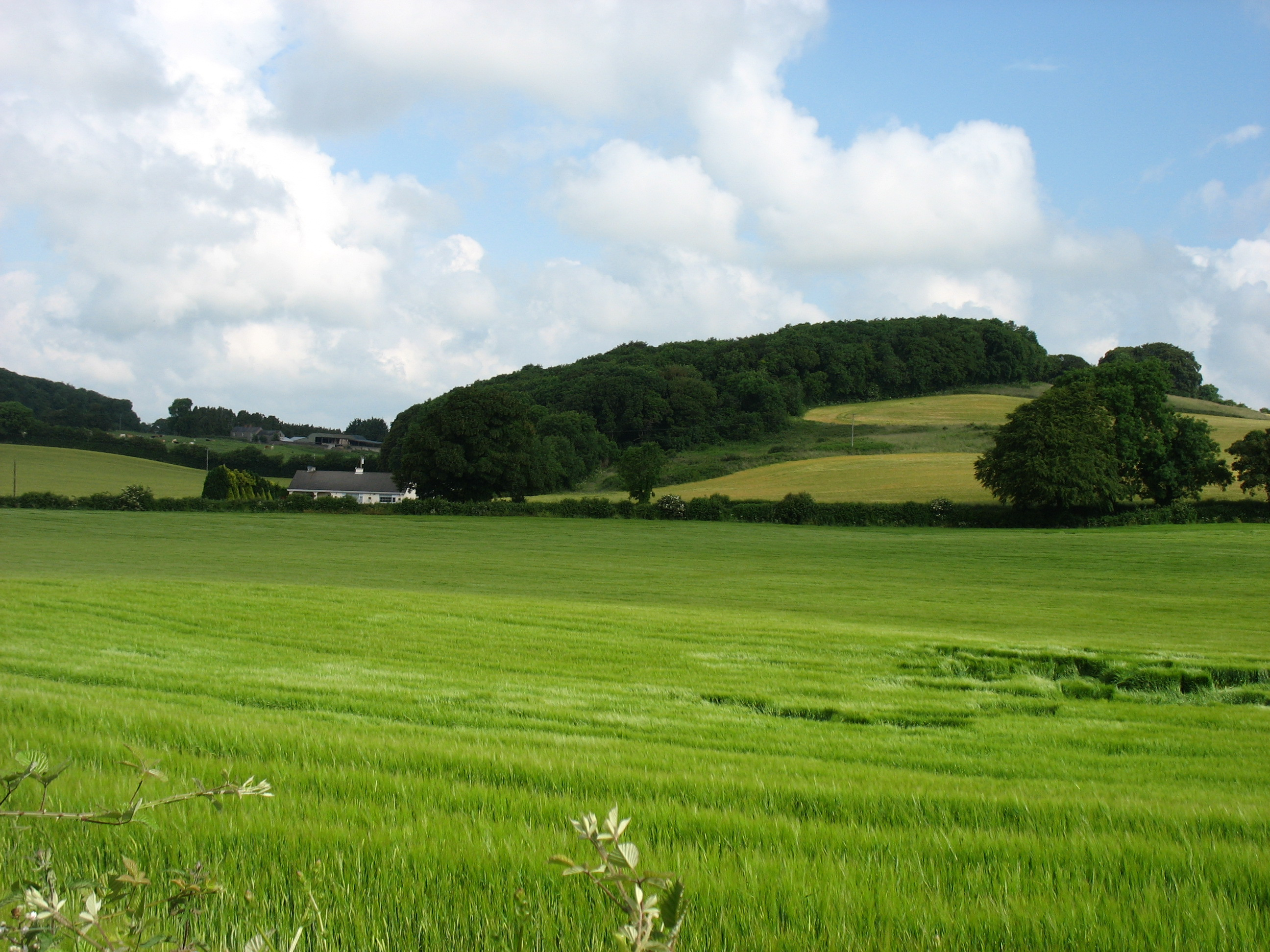
- View from Dunamase of Dysart Woods; Aghnahily Ringfort is near the middle.

- Location within Ireland
- 53°01′33″N 7°12′21″W
- Type: rath
- Cultures: Gaelic Ireland
- Location: Aghnahily, Stradbally, County Laois, Ireland

Site notes
- Material: Earth
- Area: 1,800 square metres (0.44 acres)
- Diameter: 48 metres (52 yd)

Designations
- Designation: National monument

National monument of Ireland
- Official name: Aghnahily
- Reference no.: 540

Aghnahily Ringfort /ɑːknəˈhaɪlə/ is a ringfort (rath) and national monument located in County Laois, Ireland.

== Location ==
Aghnahily Ringfort is located about 700 metres (0.43 mi) south of the Rock of Dunamase, just on the south of the N80 road between Portlaoise and Stradbally.
