= Fossy Church =

Medieval church in County Laois, Ireland

- Eaglais an Fhosaidh
- Location within Ireland
- 52.957581°N 7.190272°W
- Location: Fossy Lower, Timahoe, County Laois
- Country: Ireland
- Denomination: Church of Ireland

History
- Founded: late 16th century

Specifications
- Length: 14 m (46 ft)
- Width: 8 m (26 ft)
- Height: 4 m (13 ft)

Administration
- Diocese: Leighlin

National monument of Ireland
- Official name: Fossy
- Reference no.: 114

Fossy Church is a medieval church and National Monument in County Laois, Ireland.

== Location ==
Fossy Church is located about 800 m (870 yd) southeast of Timahoe, in a walled graveyard.

== History ==
Fossy Church is thought to date to the late 16th century. The church was remodelled in 1608. Some repair work was carried out in 1903.

== Church ==
The church is rectangular in shape with upstanding walls and gables, with door and window opes, built of uncoursed rubble, with a slight base-batter. A piscina was located in the southeast corner.

== Gallery ==
View from the northwest

View from the south

interior as seen from the door

Site of the piscina

National monument sign
