= Bradford Gorham =

American politician

Member of the Rhode Island Senate
- In office 1976–1990

Member of the Rhode Island House of Representatives
- In office 1968–1970

Personal details
- Born: Bradford Gorham; March 7, 1935 Providence, Rhode Island, U.S.
- Died: October 19, 2015 (aged 80) Chester, Vermont, U.S.
- Party: Republican
- Education: Dartmouth College (BA); Harvard Law School (LLB)
- Occupation: Attorney, farmer

Bradford Gorham (March 7, 1935 – October 19, 2015) was an American politician and lawyer in the state of Rhode Island. He served in the Rhode Island Senate from 1976 to 1990 and the Rhode Island House of Representatives from 1968 to 1970. He was a member of the Republican party.
