= Château Dillon =

French wine producer

Coordinates: 44°55′15″N 0°38′32″W

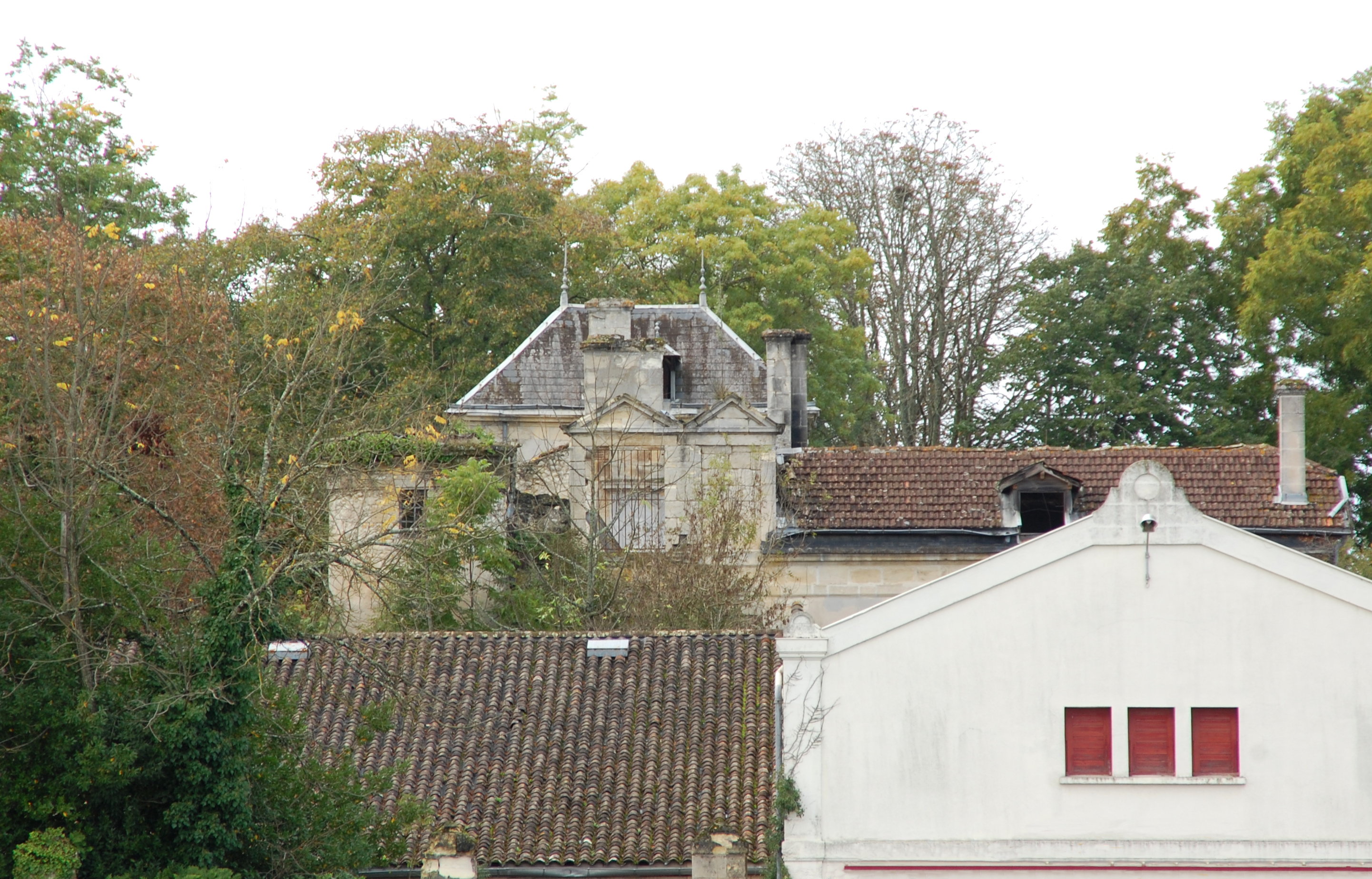
Dillon castle, Blanquefort, Gironde, France

Château Dillon is Bordeaux wine producer from the Haut Médoc appellation of Bordeaux. The château is located in the commune of Blanquefort. Château Dillon is used as a school of agriculture, together with Château La Tour Blanche in Sauternes, Château Réal Caillou in Lalande de Pomerol and Château Grand Baril in Montagne Saint Emilion.

It was founded by an Irish origin family.
