= Saint Fiacc =

Poet and first Bishop of Leinster, Ireland

St. Fiacc
- Born: c.415
- Died: c.520
- Venerated in: Roman Catholic Church; Eastern Orthodox Church
- Feast: 12 October

Saint Fiacc (c. 415–520) was a poet, the chief bishop of Leinster, and founder of two churches.

== Life ==
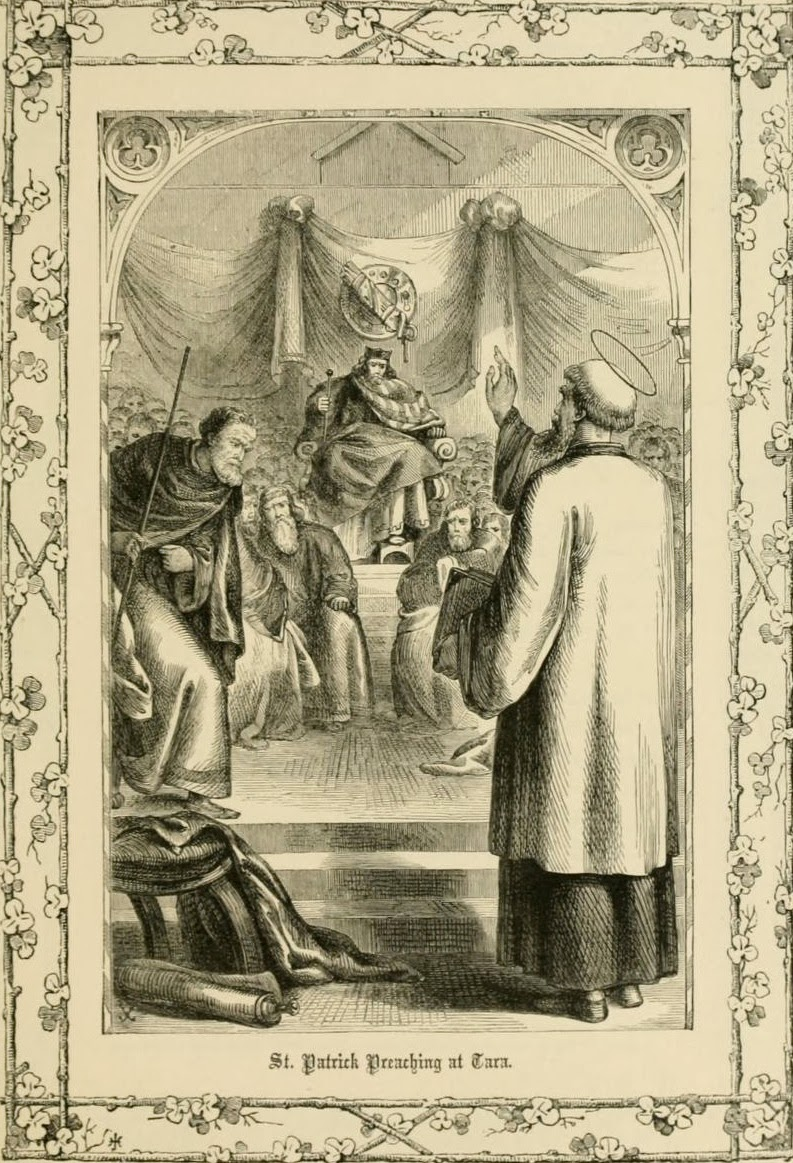
St.Patrick preaching at Tara

His father, MacDara, was prince of the Uí Bairrche in the country around Carlow, Ireland. His mother was sister of Dubhthach moccu Lughair, the Chief Ollam of Ireland, the first of Patrick's converts at Tara, and the apostle's lifelong friend. Fiacc was a pupil to his uncle in the bardic profession and soon embraced the Faith. Subsequently, when Patrick came to Leinster, he temporarily stayed at Dubhtach's house in Uí Ceinnselaig and selected Fiacc, on Dubhtach's recommendation, to be dedicated bishop for the converts of Leinster.

Fiacc was then a widower; his wife had recently died, leaving him one son named Fiacre. Patrick gave him an alphabet written with his own hand, and Fiacc acquired with marvellous rapidity the learning necessary for the episcopal order. Patrick consecrated him, and in after time appointed him chief bishop of the province. Fiacc founded the church of Domnach-Fiech, east of the River Slaney.

After many years of austere life in this place, Fiacc was led by angelic command to remove to the west of the River Barrow, for there "he would find the place of his resurrection". The legends state that he was directed to build his oratory where he should meet a hind, his refectory where he should find a boar. He consulted Patrick, the latter fixed the site of his new church at Sletty -- "the highland"—a mile and a half northwest of Carlow. This foundation does not survive, but a medieval church and two undecorated crosses do.

Here he built a large monastery, which he ruled as abbot while at the same time he governed the surrounding country as bishop. Sletty may have been one of the first scriptoriums in Ireland. His annual Lent retreat to the cave of Drum-Coblai and the rigours of his Lenten fast, on five barley loaves mixed with ashes, are mentioned in his life by Jocelyn of Furness. He suffered for many years from a painful disease and Patrick, commiserating his infirmity, sent him a chariot and a pair of horses to help him in the visitation of the diocese. He lived to a very old age; sixty of his pious disciples were gathered to their rest before him. He was buried in his own church at Sletty, his son Fiacre, whom Patrick had ordained priest, occupying the same grave. They are mentioned in several calendars as jointly revered in certain churches.

== Veneration ==
His feast day is 12 October.

== Legacy ==
St. Fiacc is the reputed author of the metrical life of St. Patrick in Irish, a document of prime importance as the earliest biography of the saint that has come down to us. Modern scholars generally think it was composed later, in the seventh or possibly even the eighth century.

A hymn on St. Brigid, "Audite virginis laudes", has been sometimes attributed to him, but on insufficient grounds.
