= Robert J. Gorman =

American lawyer

Robert James Gorman (April 22, 1915 – February 17, 2007) was a Chicago attorney who served at Normandy and was in the Jeep that General Dwight D. Eisenhower rode into Paris.

Gorman was born in Chicago and died at his Chicago home. Admitted to the Illinois Bar in 1940 after graduation from Chicago-Kent College of Law, Gorman was a conscientious objector in the early years of World War II until the Japanese bombed Pearl Harbor, at which time he joined American forces, served as an interpreter with the allied army in France, and rose to the rank of lieutenant. After the war he practiced probate and civil rights law and was counsel for Roosevelt University in Chicago.

== Legal career ==
While at the Northwestern University Law School, Gorman was elected Justice (President) Of Phi Alpha Delta, the country's largest co-ed legal fraternity. Later, he became Justice of the Chicago Alumni Chapter and was also elected District Justice which covered a four state area. Gorman received his law degree in 1940 from Chicago-Kent College of Law.

After graduation from law school, he was admitted to the Illinois State Bar Association on October 10, 1940 and immediately entered private practice. Shortly after war was declared, Gorman served four years as a lieutenant in the U.S. Army, being honorably discharged in January 1946.

After serving in World War II, he practiced probate and civil rights law and was counsel for Roosevelt University in Chicago from the time of the school's inception during the 1940s until his retirement four decades later. He also successfully defended many conscientious objectors to the Vietnam War on a pro bono basis, winning 19 out of 20 such cases that he took on.

Other clients included Roy E. Eaton, who was wrongly imprisoned for 16 years for robbery before another man confessed to the crime. The story caught the attention of the national media, including the Saturday Evening Post. Eaton's case was later documented in an episode of NBC's Armstrong Circle Theatre entitled "Error in Judgement" that featured an interview with Gorman in the closing segment. Subsequently, Gorman then won the first payment for a wrongful conviction case in Illinois when the State Legislature awarded Eaton a "personal injury" payment.

== Personal life ==
Gorman's paternal ancestry originates in County Tyrone in Ireland. More recent generations lived in Canada. His parents, James Gorman and Isabel O'Brien, married in Chicago. Gorman and his wife, Helen J. Gorman (1920–2002), had three children: Robert, Gregory and Candace.
