= Lee A. Gorman =

American politician

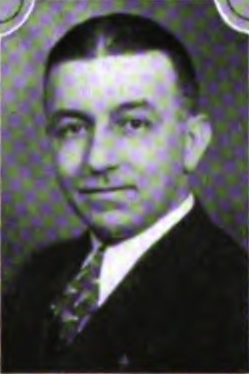
Lee A. Gorman

Lee A. Gorman (February 3, 1895 in Wisconsin – ?) was a member of the Michigan Senate. During World War I, he served in the United States Army.

== Political career ==
Gorman was a member of the Senate from 1933 to 1936. He was a Democrat.

In 1936, Gorman was arrested in Detroit and charged with abandonment of his wife and children. He had collected a veteran's bonus under the pseudonym Leo A. Grimm. Gorman was sentenced to two years in jail, with the sentence stayed on the condition that Gorman pay the alimony due to his wife.
