= Château MacCarthy =

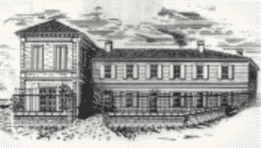
- Location: Saint-Estèphe, France
- Coordinates: 45.23816°N 0.76890°W
- Appellation: Saint-Estèphe AOC
- Founded: 1770
- Key people: Henri Duboscq, winemaker
- Parent company: Château Haut-Marbuzet & Vignobles Duboscq
- Varietals: Cabernet Sauvignon, Cabernet Franc, Merlot

Château MacCarthy is a wine from the Saint-Estèphe appellation area, Haut-Médoc, Bordeaux region, France. Once a significant and independent estate, it was bought by the Duboscq family of Château Haut-Marbuzet in 1988 and the brand has since then been used to label the second wine of their production.

== History ==
The estate was named after Dennis MacCarthy (1719–1796), a member of the eldest branch of clan MacCarthy-Diarmuid-Reagh, formerly established at Cloghan Castel, county Cork, Ireland. It is believed that the MacCarthys were Jacobite Catholics who followed King James II Stuart to France in 1692, after his defeat at the Battle of the Boyne. Among other noble Irishmen, like the Lynchs, the Clarkes and the Dillons, Dennis MacCarthy settled near Bordeaux, an active French port of the time, where he established his family.

Applied to Bordeaux, the broader movement of Irish exiles to Continental Europe known as Flight of the Wild Geese is called the "Flight of the Wine Geese" as many of them left traces in the Médoc wine industry by creating estates which bore their names.

In Bordeaux, their fortunes prospered. Dennis MacCarthy became a prominent citizen, director of the Chamber of Commerce in 1767, then Premier Consul of the city in 1767-1768. His nephews John and Donald MacCarthy founded MacCarthy Frères a négociant company specialized in shipping wines to Britain, Ireland and Scandinavia. A rue MacCarthy in Bordeaux-Caudéran commemorates their ascension. In 1815, all the vines of Marbuzet formed part of MacCarthy estate. In 1854, they were forced to divide up the estate and sell it to the Raymond family.

== Gallery ==
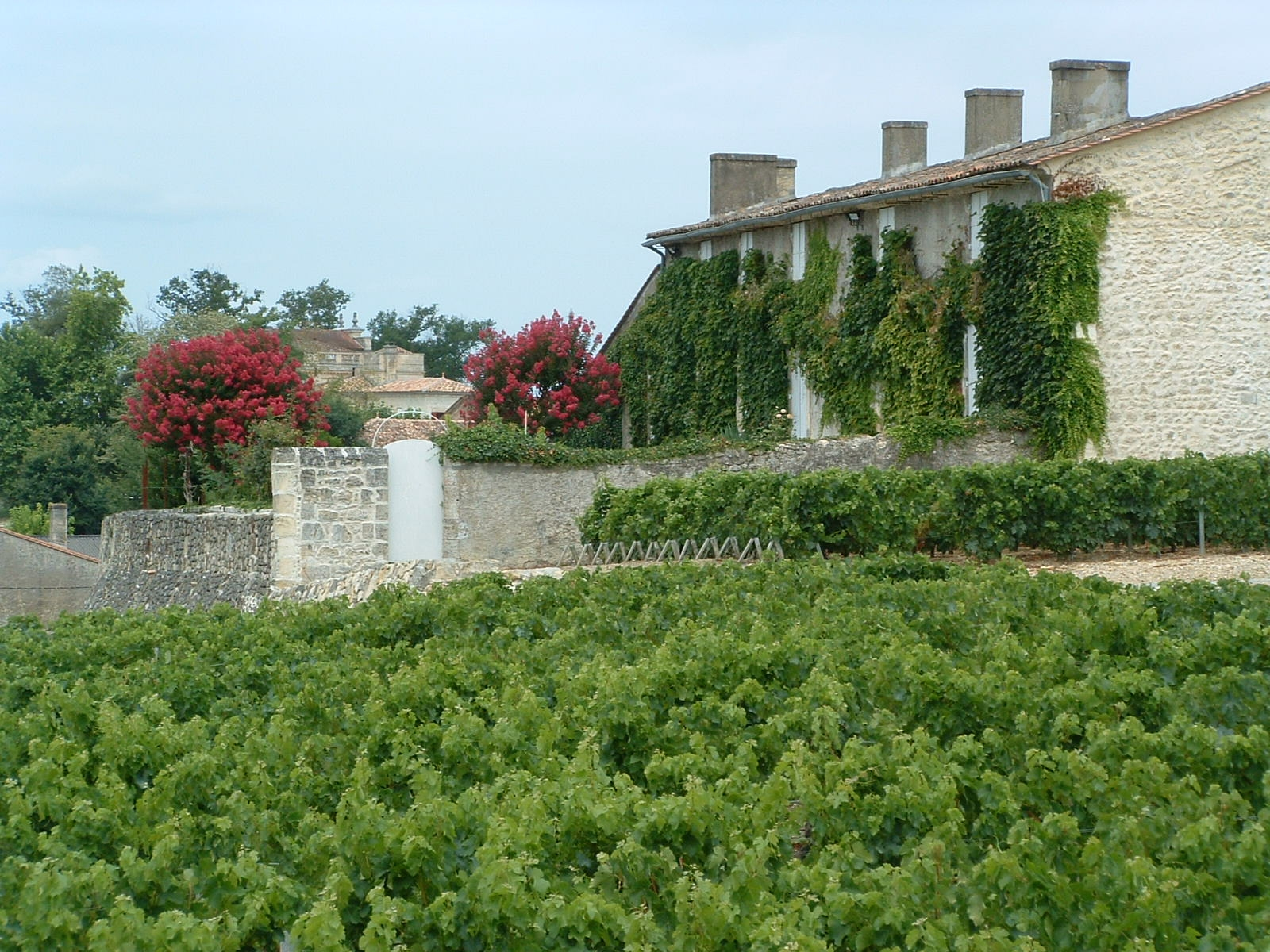
The MacCarthy House at Marbuzet

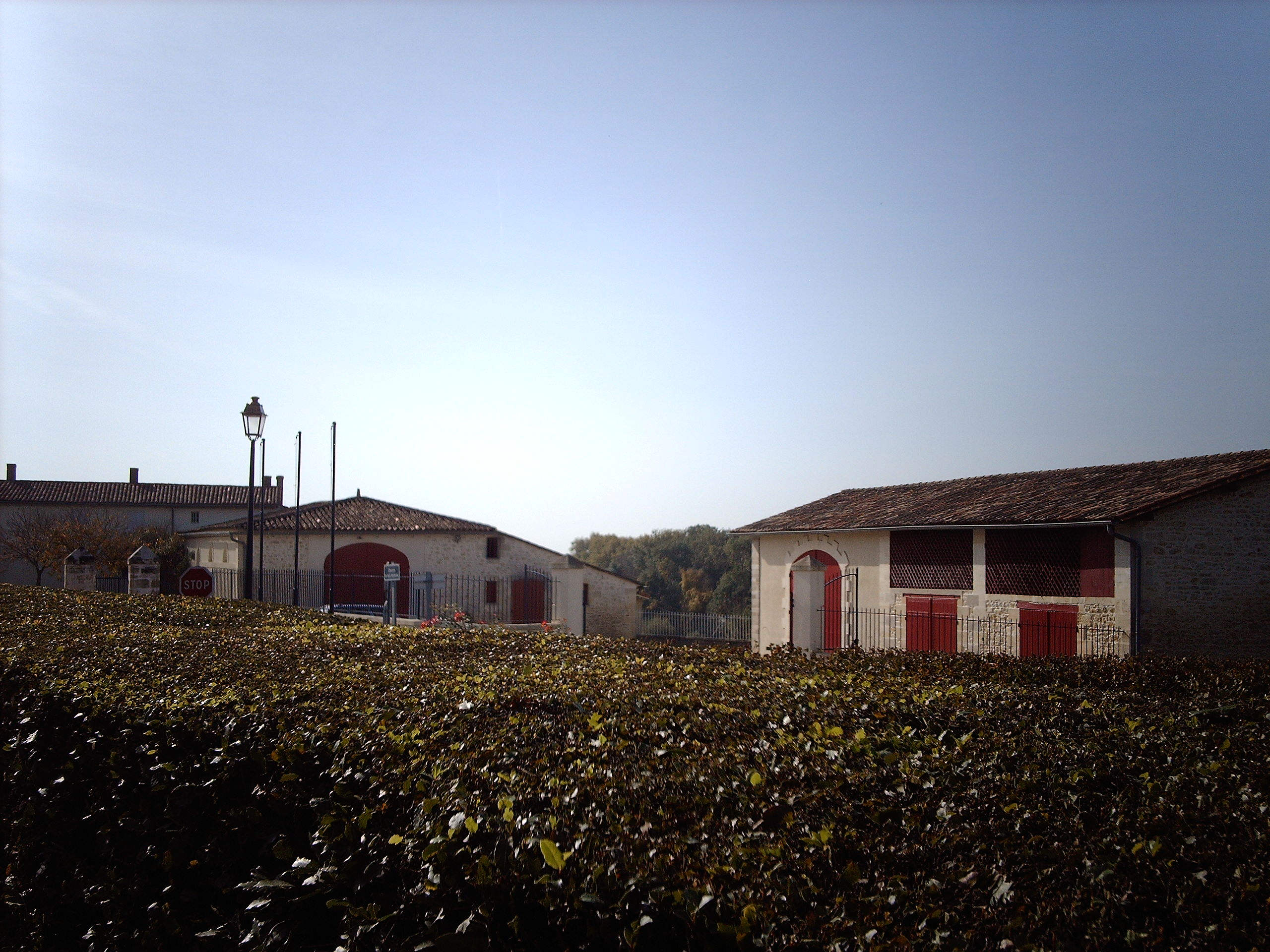
MacCarthy cellars

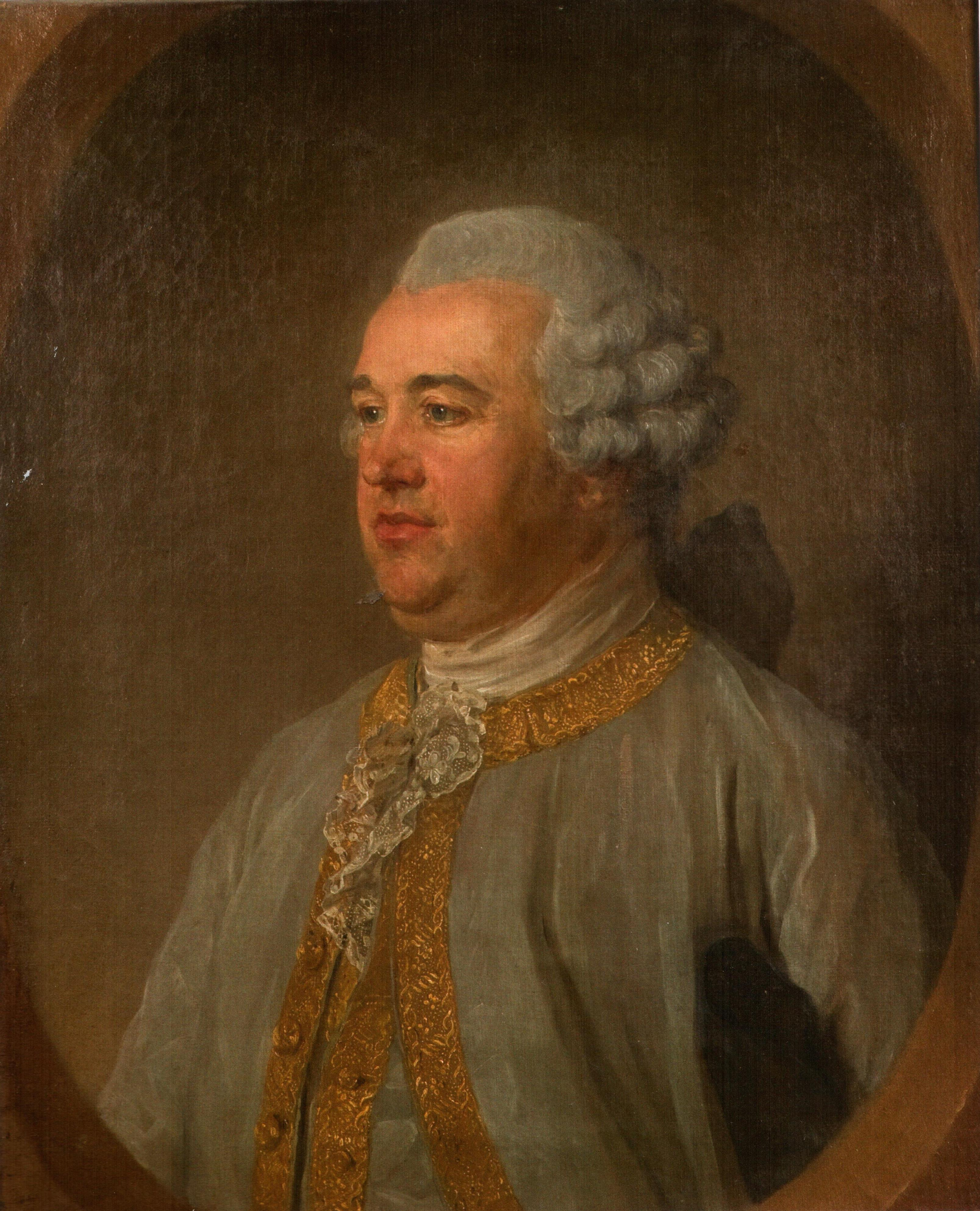
Dennis MacCarthy by Perronneau
