= Sletty =

Civil parish in County Laois, Ireland

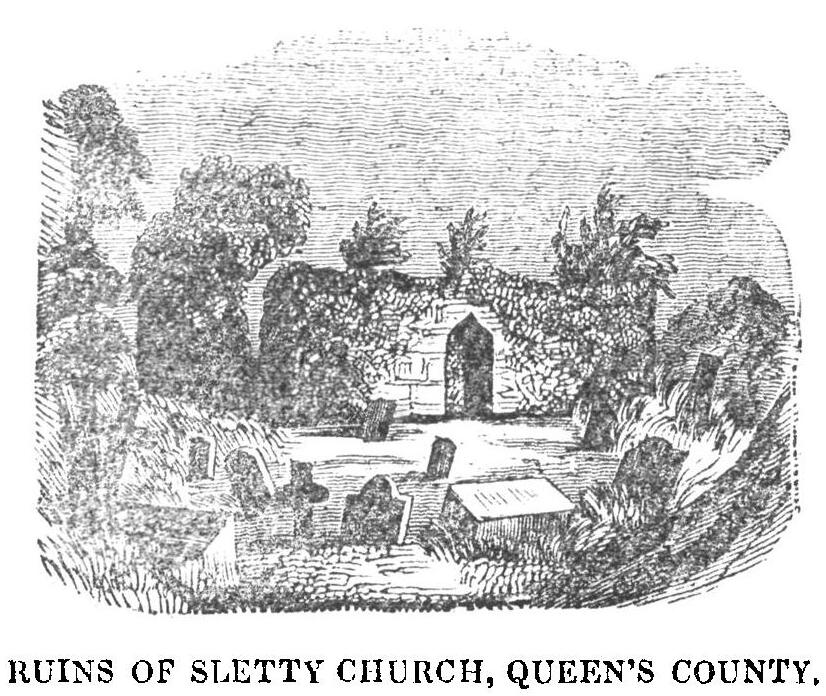
Ruins of Sletty Church, Queen's County, Dublin Penny Journal, 1834

Sletty, Sleaty, or Slatey (Sléibhte, 'mountains', in Irish), is a civil parish in County Laois, Ireland. It is situated some 2 km north-north-west of the town of Carlow. It was once the see of a bishopric, founded by Saint Fiacc in the fifth century, but this was later transferred to Leighlin. It was at Sletty, according to James Joyce in his novel Ulysses, that Cormac mac Airt 'suffocated by imperfect deglutition of aliment', i.e. that he choked on a fishbone.

Since 1969, Sléibhte is a Catholic titular see.

== Bibliography ==
- Lewis, S. (1837) Topographical Dictionary of Ireland
