= Early Scandinavian Dublin =

Historical era in Ireland

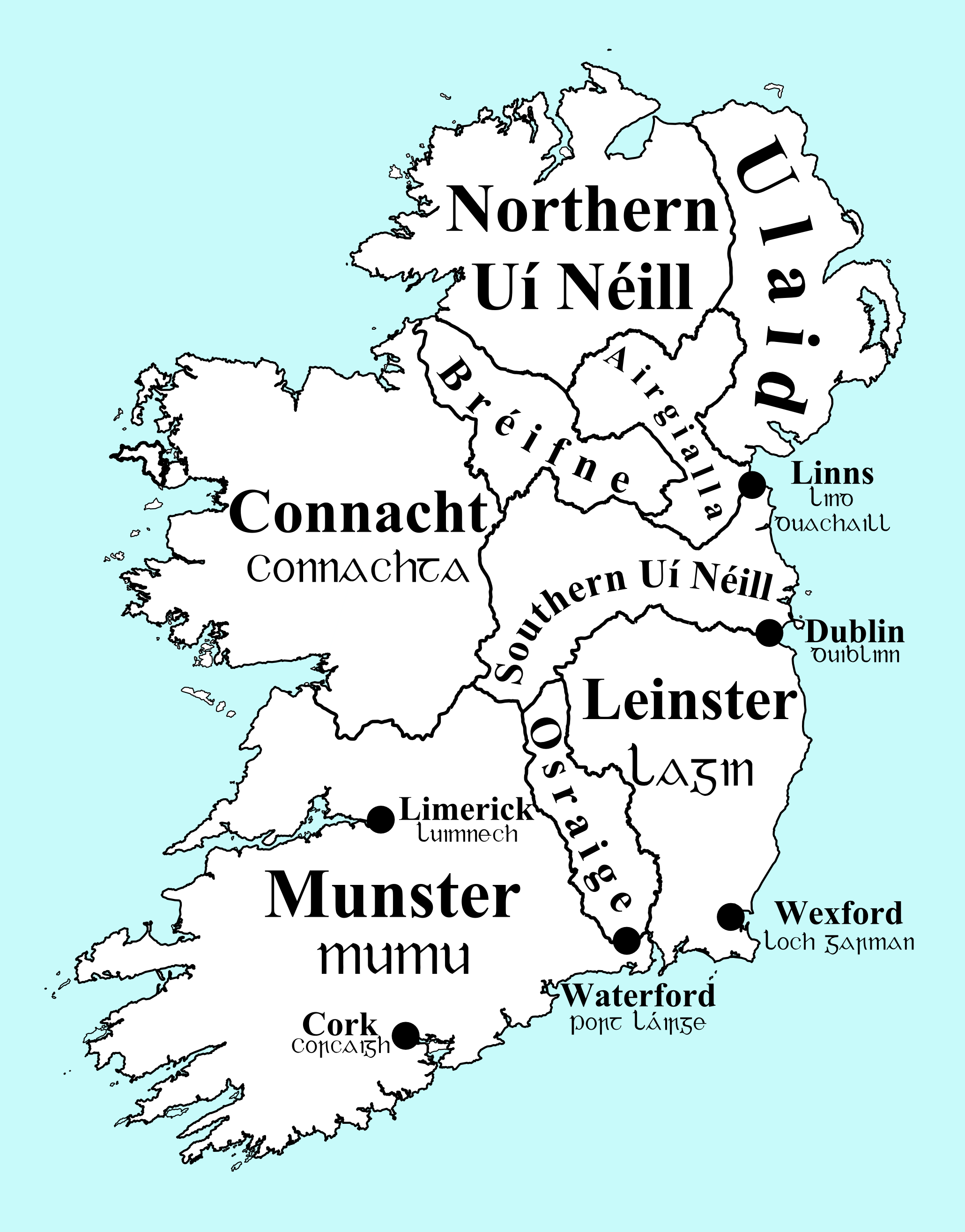
Ireland c. 900

Early Scandinavian Dublin was a major Viking settlement and pivotal center of Hiberno-Norse power in Ireland from its establishment in the mid-9th century until the Anglo-Norman invasion in 1170. The First Viking Age in Ireland began in 795, when Vikings began carrying out hit-and-run raids on Gaelic Irish coastal settlements. Over the following decades the raiding parties became bigger and better organized; inland settlements were targeted as well as coastal ones; and the raiders built naval encampments known as longphorts to allow them to remain in Ireland throughout the winter.

In the mid 9th century, Viking leader Turgeis or Thorgest founded a stronghold at Dublin, plundered Leinster and Meath, and raided other parts of Ireland. He was killed by the High King, Máel Sechnaill mac Máele Ruanaid, which was followed by several Irish victories against the Vikings and the seizure of Dublin in 849. Shortly after, a new group of Vikings known as the Dubgaill ("dark foreigners") came to Ireland and clashed with the earlier Viking settlers, now called the Finngaill ("fair foreigners").

The wavering fortunes of these three groups and their shifting alliances, together with the shortcomings of contemporary records and the inaccuracy of later accounts, make this period one of the most complicated and least understood in the fledgling city's history. In 853 a Viking warlord called Amlaíb (Old Norse: Óláfr, possibly Olaf the White) arrived and made himself king of Dublin. He ruled along with his brothers Ímar (Ívarr, possibly Ivar the Boneless) and Auisle (Ásl). For the next fifteen years or so, they used Dublin as their base for a series of campaigns against Irish kingdoms. During these conflicts they briefly allied themselves with several Irish kings.

The Dublin Vikings also carried out a number of raids in Great Britain at this time. The deaths of Ivar (c.873) and Olaf (c.874) were followed by internecine conflict among the Vikings. Although intermittent warfare between the Vikings and the Irish continued, these inner conflicts weakened the Viking colonies and made it easier for the Irish to unite against them. In 902, Cerball mac Muirecáin, king of Leinster, and Máel Findia mac Flannacáin, king of Brega, launched a two-pronged attack on Dublin and drove the Vikings from the city. However, in 914 the Vikings now known as the Uí Ímair (House of Ivar) would return to Ireland, marking the beginning of the Second Viking Age.

Evidence of early Viking burials has been discovered at sites including Cork Street, Bride Street, Kildare Street, Dollymount, and Donnybrook. Larger burial grounds have been excavated at Kilmainham, Islandbridge, Phoenix Park, Parnell Square, and College Green; however, these are believed to belong to the Second Viking Age, dating after 902.

== Early Viking raids ==
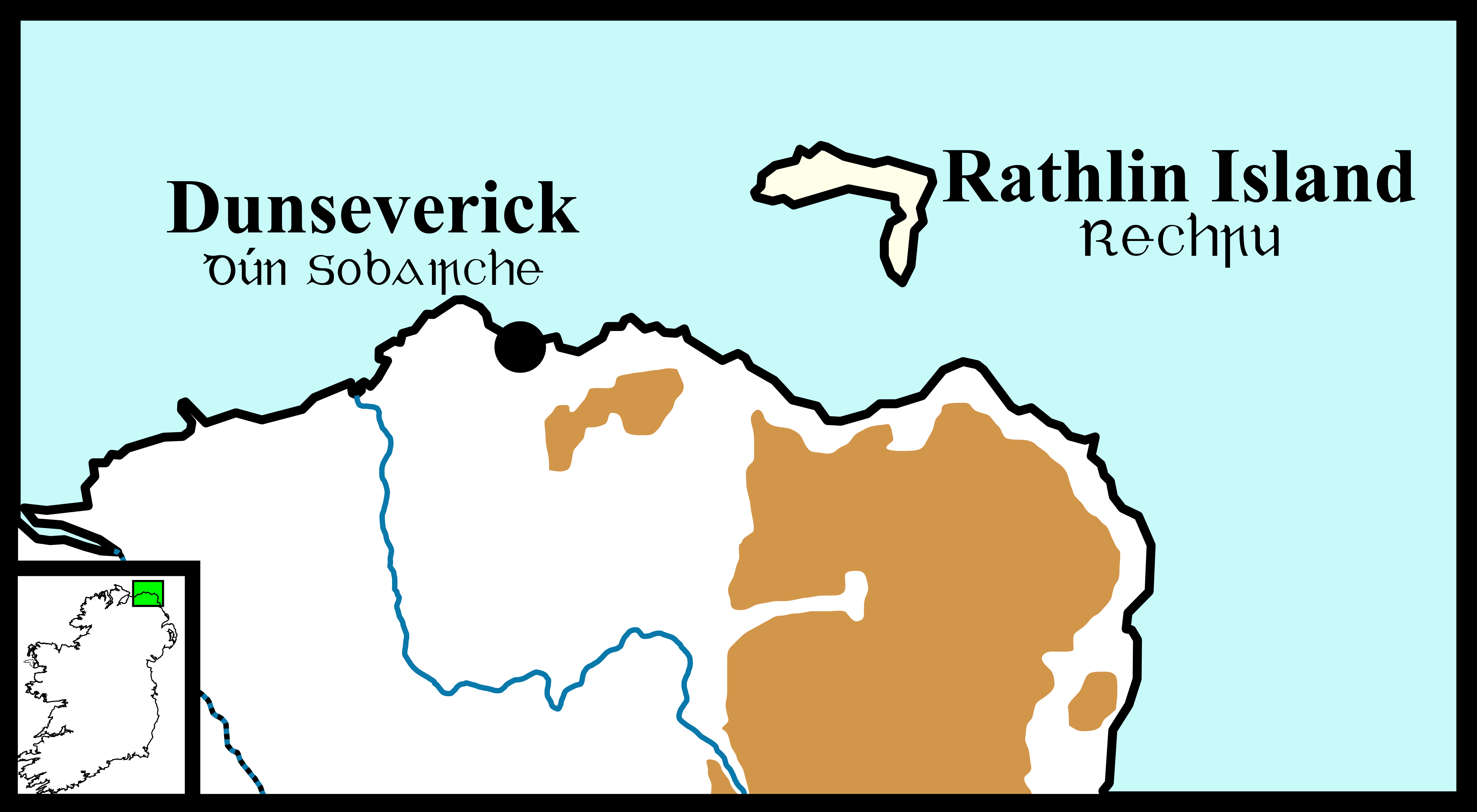
Rathlin Island

In the year 795 Vikings (probably of Norwegian origin) raided islands off the coast of Ireland for the first time. This was the beginning of a new phase of Irish history, which saw many native communities – particularly ecclesiastical ones – relocate themselves on the continent, or further afield in places like Iceland and the Faroe Islands, to escape the pagan marauders. For about two decades the invaders confined their activities to coastal settlements; raiding parties were generally small and there is no evidence that any of them wintered in Ireland during this early phase of "hit-and-run" activity. Typically the Vikings would arrive at a settlement without warning, plunder what goods and people they could – the people were usually sold as slaves, though notable personages were often held for ransom – before retreating to their Scandinavian or British bases.

The first reference to the Vikings comes from the Annals of Ulster and the first entry for 841 AD reads: "Pagans still on Lough Neagh". It is from this date onward that historians get references to ship fortresses or longphorts being established in Ireland. The Vikings may have first over-wintered in 840–841 AD. The actual location of the longphort of Dublin is still a hotly debated issue. Norse rulers of Dublin were often co-kings, and occasionally also Kings of Jórvík in what is now Yorkshire. Under their rule, Dublin became the biggest slave port in Western Europe. The hinterland of Dublin in the Norse period was named in Old Norse: Dyflinnar skíði, lit. 'Dublinshire'.

This period lasted from 795 until 813, after which there occurred a hiatus of eight years.

Southern Uí Néill

It is now thought that these early raids were launched directly from southwest Norway, and that during the period of calm (814–820) the Norwegian Vikings were occupied in northern Britain, laying the foundations of a new kingdom referred to in Irish sources as Laithlind (later Lochlainn). Laithlind was once thought to be in Norway but it is now identified with Viking settlements in the British Isles, especially those in Scotland and the Isle of Man.

In 821 the raids on Ireland were resumed with an attack on Howth, in which a large number of women were abducted. But the pattern of attacks had begun to change: raiding parties became larger and better organised; inland settlements were targeted as well as the more vulnerable maritime ones; and naval encampments were established to allow the marauders to remain in Ireland throughout the winter. In a second wave the Vikings returned later as permanent settlers. It is likely that this second wave of attacks originated in Laithlind – in northern Britain and the Scottish Isles – rather than in Norway. The leaders of these raids, however, were probably still freebooters and adventurers, acting largely on their own behalf. An actual Kingdom of Laithlind was probably not firmly established until the 830s, after which the attacks on Ireland became more protracted and better co-ordinated. In 833, during one such attack, a raiding party sailed up the Liffey and plundered the monastic settlement at Clondalkin.

== Turgesius ==
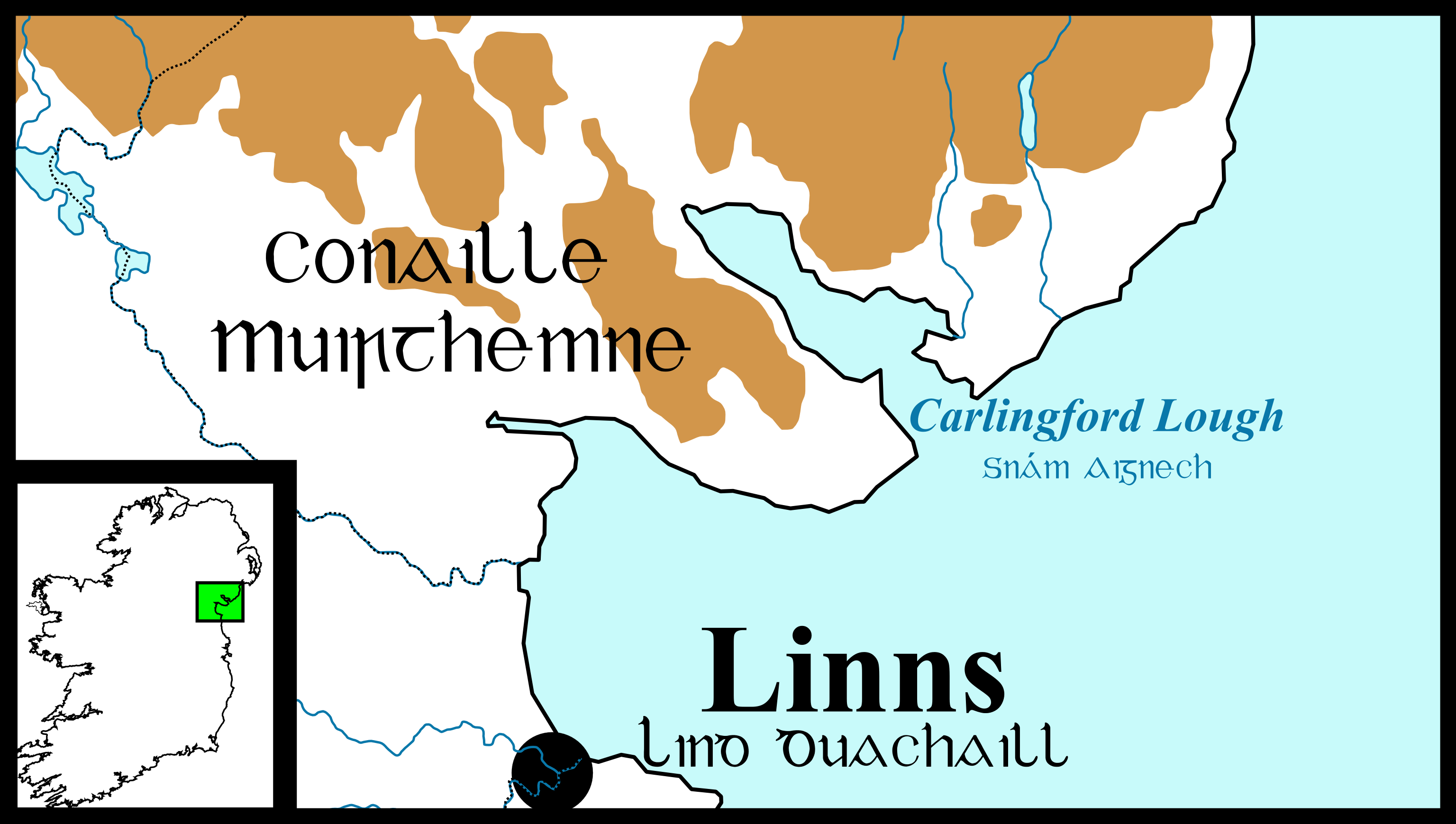
Conaille Muirthemne.

For more than a dozen years in the middle of the 9th century, most of the Viking raids in Ireland appear to have been part of a co-ordinated effort to conquer the country on behalf of the King of Laithlind. If later accounts are to be believed, this campaign was initially masterminded by a warlord referred to in Irish annals as Turgesius, Turgéis or Turges. According to the medieval Icelandic historian Snorri Sturluson, Thorgils was a son of the first King of Norway Haraldr hárfagri (Harald Fairhair). However, that this son of Harald should be Turgesius is chronologically impossible, as Harald was born around 851. Turgesius's identity remains uncertain to this day. Some commentators have identified him with the semi-legendary Danish warlord Ragnar Lodbrok. According to Saxo Grammaticus, Ragnar raided Ireland, killing a king called Melbricus. This has been identified with a raid on Conaille Muirthemne in 831 in which the king Máel Brigte was abducted by Vikings. Turgesius has also been identified with a son of GuÞfriÞ or Gudfred, the Danish king who fought against Charlemagne between 804 and 810. But no son of GuÞfriÞ with this name has been recordet anywhere. Ó Corráin state that it is thought unlikely, however, that he or any other Viking rulers in Ireland can be linked to native Norwegian or Danish dynasties.

From perhaps as early as 832 until 845 Turgesius terrorised the country and plundered dozens of Christian sites. In the process he supposedly oversaw the establishment of several Norse settlements – including one at Dublin in 841 – and became master of the northern half of the island, known in the Irish annals as Leth Cuinn, or “Conn's Half”. In the Saga of Harald Hårfagre, Snorri tells us that Þorgils ruled his newly conquered domains from Dublin, and that he was "a long time king over Dublin". In the Annals of Ulster, however, Turgéis is only mentioned in connection with an encampment on Lough Ree in 845. It is likely that his role in history was greatly exaggerated by later chroniclers and that he played no direct part in the foundation of Viking Dublin.

== The first Norse settlements in Dublin ==
The south-east of Ireland c. 900.

In 837 a fleet of sixty longships sailed up the River Liffey and raided "churches, forts and dwellings", including presumably those at Dublin. Later in the same year, a certain Saxolb (Söxulfr), "chief of the foreigners", was killed in Brega by the Uí Colgain, a branch of the Cíanachta Breg. The Chronicon Scotorum and the Annals of Clonmacnoise ascribe "the first taking and possession of the Danes in Dublin" to this year. But this was only a foretaste of things to come. In 841 the Vikings returned to Dublin, this time not as raiders but as conquerors. They seized the ecclesiastical settlement at Duiblinn and established a longphort, or naval encampment, nearby; where precisely is still a matter of debate, but the present site of Dublin Castle is a likely candidate, as it overlooked the Black Pool (Duiblinn, from which the city of Dublin takes its name), which would have served as a natural harbour.

Four years later the Annals of Ulster refer also to foreigners at Áth Cliath; this may simply be a loose reference to the settlement at Duiblinn, but it is possible that the native settlement of Áth Cliath was also seized and a second longphort established on the Liffey – possibly at Usher's Island. These settlements were temporary wintering camps (Old Norse: vintrsetl) and probably amounted to little more than pirate bases. From their new base in Dublin, the Vikings plundered many territories in Leinster and the Midlands as far as the Slieve Bloom Mountains. Many more raids were to follow. In 845 the Vikings of Dublin plundered Dún Masc (Rock of Dunamase in County Laois), killing the abbot of Tír dá Glas (Terryglass in County Tipperary) and other dignitaries; other ecclesiastical settlements plundered in the same year included Kildare, Clonenagh, Kinnitty (County Offaly), Killeigh, Kells, Monasterboice, Duleek, Swords and Finglas. In 845 they also set up an encampment near Tullamore.

In 845 Turgesius was captured by the King of Mide Máel Sechnaill and drowned in Loch Uair (Lough Owel in County Westmeath). Whatever the true extent of Turgesius's power in the country, this stroke of good fortune proved to be a turning point in “The War of the Irish with the Foreigners” (Irish: Cogad Gáedel re Gallaib) as this period of Irish history is called. Several Irish victories followed. In 847 Cerball mac Dúnlainge the King of Osraige defeated the Norsemen of Dublin and their leader Agnonn (Hákon) at Carn Brammit.

The following year the Norsemen suffered a series of decisive setbacks. Máel Sechnaill defeated them at Forrach (Farrow near Mullingar in County Westmeath). Tomrair (Þórir), the heir-designate of the King of Laithlind, was slain in a battle with Ólchobar mac Cináeda the King of Munster and Lorcán mac Cellaig the King of Leinster at Sciath Nechtain (near Castledermot in County Kildare). In the same year Tigernach mac Fócartai King of Loch Gabhair (Lagore, the royal seat of South Brega) inflicted a significant defeat on the Norsemen in an oakwood at Dísert Do-Chonna.

These defeats culminated in an attack on Dublin itself in 849. The Viking settlement was plundered and probably destroyed – at least temporarily – by Máel Sechnaill, who was now High King of Ireland, and Tigernach mac Fócartai. A fleet of 140 longships arrived in Dublin in the same year. The expedition was led by "adherents of the king of the foreigners" and their objective was "to exact obedience from the foreigners who were in Ireland before them". It was also recorded that "afterwards they caused confusion in the whole country". It is possible that this fleet was sent by the King of Laithlind in an attempt to regain lost ground – or was he perhaps hoping to profit from the discomfiture of rival Scandinavians?

The following year, we are told, the Norsemen formed an alliance with Cináed mac Conaing, the King of Cianachta North Brega, and plundered the territories of Máel Sechnaill and Tigernach and destroyed Tigernach's crannóg in Lagore. If this attack was in retaliation for the sacking of Dublin the previous year, it suggests that the fleet of 849 was indeed sent by the King of Laithlind.

== Dubgaill and Findgaill ==
In 851 a significant development took place: "The Dubgenti came to Áth Cliath, made a great slaughter of the Findgaill, and plundered the naval encampment, both people and property." It is believed that this refers to the first appearance in Ireland of a new faction of Vikings. Called the Dubgaill or Dubgenti ("Dark Foreigners" or "Dark Gentiles"), these were possibly Scandinavians of Danish or Anglo-Danish origin who hoped to take advantage of the shifting fortunes of the town's inhabitants, known as the Findgaill or Findgenti ("Fair Foreigners" or "Fair Gentiles"), who were possibly Scandinavians of Danish origin – though there is still no consensus among historians as to the meaning of these terms. Whatever their provenance, the Dubgaill defeated the Norsemen of Dublin and destroyed their settlement; in the same year they raided the longphort at Lind Dúachaill (Linns, near Annagassan in County Louth) and slaughtered the Findgaill. The following year the Dubgaill inflicted another significant defeat on the Findgaill at Snám Aignech (Carlingford Lough).

The leaders of the Findgaill in this encounter are called Stain (or Zain) and Iercne (or Iargna). In the Fragmentary Annals Zain and Iargna are co-regents (leithrí). Iercne (Old Norse: Járnkné) died in the battle; his sons are mentioned in connection with Dublin in 883 and 886. The leader of the Dubgaill is called Horm (?Ormr), who was slain in 856 by Rhodri the Great the King of Gwynedd. Later that year the Norsemen suffered two defeats in the same month at the hands of the Cianachta Breg: one at Inch near Balrothery in County Dublin, and one at Ráith Aldain (Raholland, County Meath).

A year later, in 853, a Viking warlord called Amlaíb (Old Norse: Óláfr) came to Dublin and made himself king – the first in the fledgling city's history – receiving hostages from the Vikings and tribute from the Irish. Amlaíb is described in the Annals of Ulster as "the son of the King of Laithlind"; it would appear, then, that he was the leader of the Findgaill, sent by his father GuÞfriÞ to do battle with the Dubgaill. Amlaíb has been identified with two individuals who appear in Old Norse sources, but whose historicity and provenance are uncertain: Óláfr inn hvíti (Olaf the White) and Óláfr Guðrøðarson (Olaf the Son of Guðrøðr). Óláfr inn hvíti was the son of Ingjald Helgasson and a descendant of both Hálfdan hvítbeinn (Halfdan Whitelegs) of Vestfold in Norway and Ragnar Lodbrok. Óláfr Guðrøðarsson was the son of Gudrød the Hunter. Like so many other Scandinavian characters in this period of Irish history, Amlaíb's precise identity is still uncertain, though he is probably the same person as Amhlaoibh Conung (Óláfr konungr, or Olaf the King), who is mentioned in the Fragmentary Annals of Ireland.

According to the Fragmentary Annals of Ireland, Máel Sechnaill tried to come to terms with this dangerous new rival in 854, but without success. Having made himself undisputed leader of the Norsemen in Dublin – whether Findgaill or Dubgaill – Amlaíb departed for Britain, where he was involved in numerous military campaigns. When Amlaíb returned to Dublin in 856 or 857, he was accompanied by two of his brothers, Ímar (Old Norse: Ívarr) and Auisle (Old Norse: Ásl). Ímar has been identified with Ivar the Boneless (Old Norse: Ívarr inn beinlausi Ragnarsson), a semi-legendary character who appears in the Old Norse sagas. According to Norse tradition, Ívarr was a son of the semi-legendary Danish warlord Ragnar Loðbrok. The Fragmentary Annals of Ireland provide an alternative genealogy, but one which dates from the 11th century – and therefore equally suspect. According to another entry in the Fragmentary Annals, Ímar and Auisle were Amlaíb's brothers, all three being sons of Gofraid mac Ragnaill the King of Laithlind.

Ímar became Amlaíb's co-regent in Dublin around 857. Auisle was co-regent from about 863 until his death in 867.

== Campaigns in Ireland ==
Ailech, the royal seat of the Northern Ui Néill.

Whatever their provenance, both the Findgaill and the Dubgaill were politically and militarily active throughout the islands of Britain and Ireland for the remainder of the 9th century. For the next fifteen years or so, Amlaíb and Ímar used Dublin as their base of operations for a series of campaigns, which may have involved Vikings from both factions. To avoid the inconvenience of having to wage wars on several fronts, they formed alliances with several Irish leaders. Amlaíb may have married daughters of Áed Findliath King of Ailech, of Cináed mac Conaing the King of Brega, and of Cerball mac Dúnlainge the King of Osraige. They also forged an alliance with the King of Osraige Cerball mac Dúnlainge, who was one of the most powerful and ambitious men in the country.

In 856 a major conflict arose between the Norsemen and Máel Sechnaill, who was then allied to mercenaries of mixed Gaelic and Scandinavian background known as the Gallgoídil. In that year two important ecclesiastical settlements in Brega — Slane and Lusk — were sacked. The perpetrators of these attacks are not named, but the Norsemen of Dublin were probably behind both of them.

The south-west of Ireland c. 900.

In 857 the conflict shifted to Munster, where Amlaíb and Ímar defeated Caittil Find and the Gallgoídil. The following year Ímar and Cerball mac Dúnlainge defeated the Cenél Fiachach and the Gallgoídil at Ara Tíre. In 859 Amlaíb, Ímar and Cerball jointly attacked Máel Sechnaill and the Gallgoídil in Mide. In the same year, however, at the royal Synod of Ráith Aeda Meic Bric (Rahugh, County Westmeath, in the territory of the Cenél Fiachach), a temporary peace was made between the contending parties. Cerball submitted to the High King and his kingdom of Osraige was transferred from Munster to Leth Cuinn, placing it under Máel Sechnaill's authority; this transfer of sovereignty was sanctioned by the king of Munster Máel Gualae mac Donngaile. Later that year, however, Máel Gualae fell into the hands of the Dublin Norsemen, who killed him in a pagan sacrifice. Thus ended – for a time, at least – the alliance between Cerball mac Dúnlainge and the Norsemen.

The following two years were marked by the fluctuating fortunes of both natives and invaders; alliances between the two were fluid and the conflict was relentless. Cerball mac Dúnlainge joined forces with his new overking Máel Sechnaill, while Amlaíb and Ímar aligned themselves with one of Máel Sechnaill's enemies, Áed Findliath of Ailech. In 860 Máel Sechnaill and Cerball took up arms against Áed Findliath and another of the High King's principal enemies, Flann mac Conaing of Brega, defeating them (though not decisively) at Moy near Armagh. In 861 Áed and the Norsemen of Dublin jointly plundered Máel Sechnaill's territories in Mide, but Máel Sechnaill defeated them at Drumomuy near the River Feegile on the border between County Offaly and County Kildare. In 862 Áed, Flann and the Norsemen of Dublin once again invaded Mide, but Máel Sechnaill's death in November of that year effectively brought the campaign to an end. Áed Findliath succeeded him as High King. After Máel Sechnaill's death his kingdom of Mide was divided among two claimants to the throne, Lorcán mac Cathail and Conchobar mac Donnchada.

The succession of Áed led to another series of alliances between natives and invaders. The Norsemen of Dublin now allied themselves with Lorcán mac Cathail, one of the rival kings of Mide. In 863 Lorcán, Amlaíb, Ímar and Auisle invaded Flann mac Conaing's kingdom of Brega, during which invasion they plundered the megalithic tombs in the Boyne Valley, an unprecedented act of sacrilege. 863 also saw the death of Muirecán mac Diarmata, the King of Leinster, at the hands of the Norsemen; so Amlaíb and his allies must also have campaigned south of the Liffey. The following year, however, everything had changed again. Lorcán was blinded by Áed Findliath, and Amlaíb drowned his co-regent Conchobar mac Donnachada at Clonard, an important ecclesiastical site in Mide.

== Campaigns in Britain ==
Moy and Armagh.

In 866 the Norsemen of Dublin turned their attention to Britain. Amlaíb and Auisle plundered the Pictish kingdom of Fortriu in Scotland in that year, returning to Dublin with many hostages. The following year the brothers are reported to have quarrelled over one of Amlaíb's wives and Auisle was killed.

It has been claimed that from 865 to 869 Ímar and a kinsman Hálfdan accompanied the Great Heathen Army which ravaged the Anglo-Saxon kingdoms of Britain around this time. The Anglo-Saxon Chronicle refer to the leaders of this army as Ingware and Ubba. Ingware has been identified with Ímar, though Ubba's identity is unknown. The 10th-century historian Æthelweard noted that the fleet of the Great Heathen Army arrived "from the north" in 865 and wintered in East Anglia. This suggests that the invasion was launched from Laithlind, though the Anglo-Saxon Chronicle refers to the invaders as Danes, and they are often linked to a band of Vikings who pillaged northern France between 845 and 865. Ingware's army is reported to have crossed the Humber the following year and captured York, the capital of Northumbria. In 867 Mercia was invaded but no major engagement took place, as the Mercians sued for peace.

In late 869 the Great Heathen Army wintered in Thetford, East Anglia. In November they defeated Edmund the King of East Anglia and seized his kingdom. At this time the army was led by Ingware and Ubba, but the following year the army's two heathen kings are called Bachsecg and Halfdene (Halfdan Ragnarsson). In 870 Ímar was campaigning with his brother Amlaíb in Scotland, so it appears that his kinsman Hálfdan took his place as one of the leaders of the Great Heathen Army in England. According to Aethelweard's Chronicon Igwares (Ingware) died in 870 – a detail which must be accounted for by those historians who believe that Ímar and Iguuar were one and the same individual. Halfdene continued the conquest of northern England with the assistance of the Great Summer Army, which arrived in 871. Repton was taken in 873, which led to the fall of eastern Mercia. In the winter of 874 he settled on the Tyne in Northumbria, from which numerous attacks on the Picts and Strathclyde were launched. In 875 or 876 Halfdene divided Northumbria in two: the northern kingdom of Bernicia remained a puppet state ruled by Angles, while the southern kingdom of Deira or Jórvík was ruled directly by the Danes. Halfdene then disappears from the Chronicle. In 875 Albdann (Hálfdan) is reported to have "deceitfully killed" Amlaíb's son Oistín (Eysteinn) and taken Dublin.

It may be possible, then, to synchronise the activities of Ingware and Halfdene in England as recorded in the English annals with the activities of Ímar and Albann in Ireland and Laithlind as recorded in the Irish annals; nevertheless, some discrepancies remain, and this has led a number of modern historians to reject the identity of Ingware and Ímar (though not necessarily that of Halfdene and Albdann).

In 870 Amlaíb and Ímar besieged Ail Cluaithe, or Dumbarton, the capital of Strathclyde; they captured the stronghold following a four-month siege, and returned to Dublin in 871 with a great deal of plunder. Later that year they stormed the fortress of Dún Sobairche or Dunseverick in County Antrim with the assistance of the Cenél nEógain, whose leader was the High King Áed Findliath. Before the end of 871, Amlaíb returned to Scotland to suppress a Norse uprising against his father Gofraid mac Ragnaill. During this time (871–872), Ímar and Amlaíb's son Oistín (Eysteinn) plundered Ireland "from east to west and from north to south". By 878 the Findgaill and Dubgaill were dominant in many parts of Britain, controlling territories in Scotland, Strathclyde, Northumbria, East Anglia, Wales and Mercia. Their expansion was eventually halted by Alfred the Great of Wessex, whose victory in the Battle of Edington in May 878 paved the way for the creation of the kingdom of England.

== Domestic troubles ==
In 866, when Amlaíb and Auisle were invading Fortriu, Flann mac Conaing King of Brega took advantage of their absence to exact revenge for their invasion of 863, inflicting a significant defeat on the Norsemen. In the same year Cennétig mac Gaíthéne, king of Loígis, defeated the Norsemen at Mindroichet (Mondrehid in County Laois). In 867 a force led by Cennétig and Máel Ciaráin mac Rónáin burned Amlaíb's fortress at Clondalkin, near Dublin, and killed 100 of his followers. They followed this up with a successful attack on Dublin itself in the same year, in which Odolb Micle was killed. This shadowy figured may have been Amlaíb and Ímar's regent. Undeterred by this setback, Amlaíb plundered the monastery of Lis Mór in Munster (Lismore, County Waterford) before the end of the year. According to one interpretation of Cogad Gáedel re Gallaib, it was on this occasion that Auisle lost his life. In 869 Máel Ciaráin mac Rónáin came to a grisly end. Having been expelled from Leinster by jealous rivals, he allied himself by marriage to the High King Áed Findliath and invaded Leinster. He was defeated, however; his body was hacked to pieces and his head cut off. Subsequently, his head was given to the Norsemen of Dublin, who used it for target-practice before casting it into the sea. In the same year, Amlaíb plundered the great monastic settlement of Armagh. This raid was possibly launched in retaliation for the death of his son Carlus, who had lost his life the previous year fighting for the kings of Leinster and Brega against Áed Findliath (the protector of Armagh) in the Battle of Cella Ua nDaigri (Killineer, County Louth). We are not told when precisely the alliance between Amlaíb and Áed Findliath (established around 860) fell apart; possibly it happened when Áed became High King in 862.

In 870, while Amlaíb and Ímar were besieging Dumbarton, Áed Findliath laid waste Leinster "from Dublin to Gowran", though it is not clear whether Dublin itself was attacked during this campaign. In the same year, a leader of the Dubgaill called Úlfr invaded eastern Ireland and killed Máel Sechnaill mac Néill, one of the two kings of South Brega .

In 872, we are told by the Fragmentary Annals of Ireland, "the kings of the foreigners" massacred the men of the Three Plains and the Three Comanns in Counties Laois, Kildare and Carlow. If these kings were Amlaíb and Ímar, this must have been their last raid on Irish soil, for within a year Ímar was dead.

Ímar's death is recorded in the Annals of Ulster and the Chronicon Scotorum under the year 873. In the Fragmentary Annals of Ireland, under the same year, it is reported that "the king of Lochlainn" died of a "sudden horrible disease". This cause of death is not mentioned in any other source, but it raises the interesting possibility that it was the crippling effects of this unidentified disease that led to Ímar's Old Norse sobriquet Ívarr inn beinlausi, or Ivar the Boneless.

According to the Chronicle of the Kings of Alba, Amlaíb died around 874–875 in Dollar during a protracted campaign against Constantine I of Scotland. These deaths ushered in three decades of uncertainty for the Norse settlements in Ireland. Internecine conflict between the different factions weakened the colonies and made it easier for the Irish to unite against them. During this period most of the Norse colonies at Dublin, Wexford, Waterford, Cork and Limerick fell under the sway of native rulers, as the former allies of the Norsemen turned against them. It has even been claimed that Cerball mac Dúnlainge assumed the kingship of Dublin around this time (possibly with the consent of its Norse inhabitants), but there is nothing in the Irish sources to support this.

== Epigoni ==
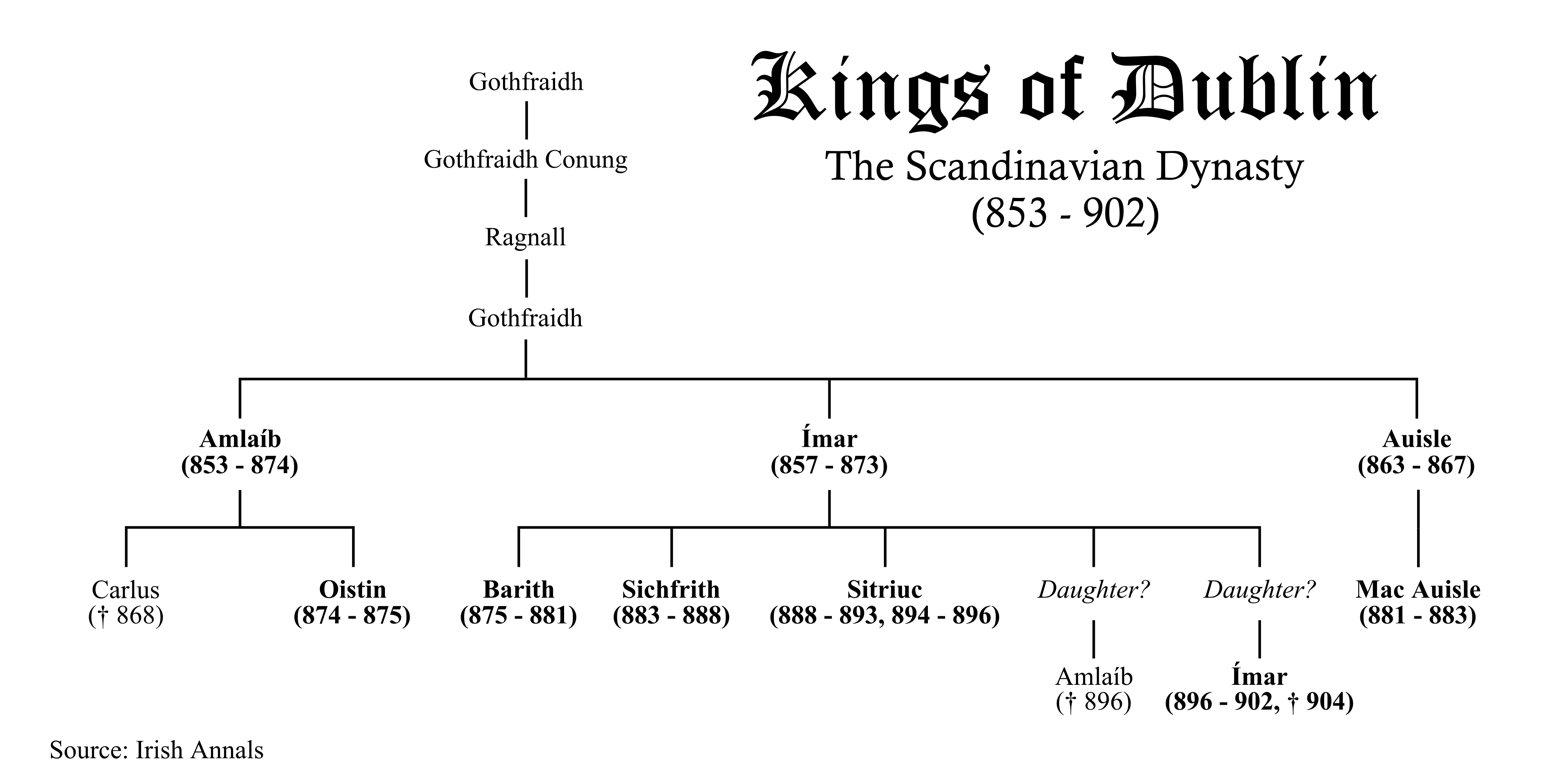
The Scandinavian dynasty of Dublin.

In Dublin Amlaíb was succeeded by one of his sons, Oistin (Eysteinn); but Albdann (Hálfdan), the leader of the Dubgenti and conqueror of Northumbria, also claimed the throne. In 875 Hálfdan invaded the settlement and killed Eysteinn, but the High King Áed Findliath intervened and expelled him from the city, replacing him with Ímar's son Barith (Old Norse: Bárðr), who was the foster-father of Áed's son. This was the last serious conflict in the War of the Irish with the Foreigners for a generation. Later chroniclers record that Ireland enjoyed a "Forty Years' Rest" from foreign invaders between 876 and 916. Hálfdan was slain in a battle with the Findgaill in Loch Cuan (Strangford Lough) in 877. In the relevant entry in the Annals of Ulster he is described as the leader of the Dubgenti; In Cogad Gaedel re Gallaib Barith is named as the leader of the Findgenti; this would seem to support the theory that Hálfdan's brother Ingware was not the same man as Ímar the Norse king of Dublin, the former being of the Dubgenti and the latter of the Findgenti.

Barith had been active in Ireland while Amlaíb was still on the throne; he may have participated in Amlaíb's raid on Lismore in 867; also in 867 he narrowly avoided assassination during a raid in Connacht in which a kinsman Háimar was killed, and in 873 he and Oistín had invaded Munster with a fleet of ships. Six years later Vikings plundered Armagh and held the abbot and the lector hostage; Barith may have been behind this raid. Finally, in 881, he sacked the oratory of St Cianán at Damhliag in Brega (Duleek in Meath). It is possible that Barith was also Lord or King of Limerick.

Intermittent warfare between the Norsemen of Dublin and their Irish neighbours continued despite the forty years' rest. Barith died in 881 shortly after sacking the oratory of St Cianán; he was succeeded by an unnamed son of Auisle, who is referred to in the annals as Mac Auisle. In 883 Mac Auisle was killed by Otir (Ottár) the son of Iercne (i.e. Járnkné, who had been killed by the Dubgaill at Carlingford Lough in 852) and Muirgel the daughter of Máel Sechnaill I. The motive for this killing is unknown, but it suggests that there was an alliance by marriage between Máel Sechnaill and Járnkné.

Mac Auisle was succeeded in turn by another son of Ímar, Sichfrith Ivarsson (883–888), who burned the monasteries of Lismore and Cloyne in the first year of his reign. He may also have been responsible for an attack on the ecclesiastical settlement of Kildare in 885 or 886 in which the vice-abbot Suibne mac Duib dá Boirennn was taken captive with 280 others. During Sichfrith's reign there was further civil unrest in the colony, caused by another son of Járnkné called Eolóir. In 886 Eolóir killed Airemón mac Áedo, one of the two kings of Ulster. Eolóir appears to have been a claimant to the throne of Dublin around this time. In 888 Sichfrith routed the forces of the High King Flann Sinna (a son of Máel Sechnaill). It has been suggested that the death in 888 of Cerball mac Dúnlainge, who may have been the true overlord of Dublin at this time, acted as a catalyst for Flann Sinna's attempt to conquer the city.

In 888 Sichfrith Ivarsson was assassinated by his brother Sitric I, who held the throne for five years (888–893). During this time the Dubliners were strong enough to carry out successful raids on major monasteries. They plundered Ardbraccan, Donaghpatrick, Dulane, Glendalough, Kildare and Clonard all within the space of two years (890–891). But a son of Barith called Eolair was killed by the Uí Amalgada of Tír Amalgada (Tirawley in County Mayo).

In 893 another conflict arose and the ruling dynasty in Dublin split into two factions, one led by Sitric and the other by a pretender called Sigfrith the Jarl (Old Norse: Sigfrøðr or Sigurðr). This shadowy figure may have been the same Sigfrøðr who was King of Jórvík from 895 to 900; a Viking called Sigfrøðr also led a Northumbrian fleet against Wessex in 893; it is possible that all three were one and the same man. The Annals of Ulster record that, "the foreigners of Áth Cliath [Dublin] became dispersed, one faction following the son of Ímar [Sitric I] and the other faction following Sigfrith the Jarl." It is possible that Sitric was deposed and Sigfrith the Jarl became king, but this is not at all certain; it is also possible that both factions left the city. The Annals of Inisfallen record that, "The heathens departed from Ireland this year [893]."Cogad Gáedel re Gallaib also implies that Sitric son of Ímar and his people went to Scotland around 892. Whatever the truth of the matter, Sitric returned the following year. It is not clear whether he expelled Sigfrith the Jarl or whether the latter had already left of his own accord.

In 895 a Norseman called Glúniarann ("Iron Knee", an Irish translation of the Norse Járnkné) led an army from Dublin to Armagh, where 710 prisoners were captured.

In 896 Sitric I was slain "by other Norsemen"; he was succeeded, probably, by his son or nephew Ivar II the Younger. In the same year "Amlaíb grandson of Ímar" and Glúniarann's son Glúntradna were slain by the Conaille Muirthemne of County Louth and Aitíth mac Laigni the King of Ulster. Later in the same year the Norsemen of Dublin killed Flannacán mac Cellaig, King of Brega. We are not told whether these events were linked. Little is known of the reign of Ivar II; Kildare was plundered again by "the heathens" in 900, which may have been his doing.

The final blow fell in 902, when Cerball mac Muirecáin King of Leinster and Máel Findia mac Flannacáin King of Brega launched a two-pronged attack on Dublin from the north and the south, and drove Ivar II out of the city. The Norsemen's defeat was comprehensive. They fled, leaving "great numbers of their ships behind them, and escaped half-dead across the sea." According to the Annals of the Four Masters, some survivors of the initial onslaught took refuge on Ireland's Eye, where they were besieged. Some of the ousted Norsemen fled to Wales under Hingamund (Old Norse: Ingimundr), a shadowy figure who may have usurped Ivar II's throne shortly before the fall of Dublin. Hingamund was driven out of Wales and eventually settled in the Wirral in the northwest of England, where he was granted lands by Æðelflæd the Queen of Mercia, who was acting as regent for her chronically ill husband Æthelred. Others are said to have fled to the Loire valley in France. Ivar II went to Scotland, where he died in 904.

Dublin was now under Gaelic control, and remained so for fifteen years. Excavations have revealed that the site of Viking Dublin was not actually abandoned during these years. Presumably it was only the ruling dynasty and their warriors who were expelled; many families of Norse farmers, traders, artisans, etc., may have remained, under the jurisdiction of native Irish chieftains. The First Viking Age was at an end.

== The archaeological record ==
Dublin c. 900.

This period of Dublin's history is still very obscure. Despite the existence of a wealth of documentary evidence for Viking activity in the Dublin region throughout the 9th century, relatively little archaeological evidence has been unearthed to corroborate the testimony of contemporary annalists. The pioneering 19th-century historian Charles Haliday bewailed the silence of contemporary Irish sources "respecting the social position, religion, laws, and monuments of those who occupied Dublin for more than three hundred years on all facts ... excepting such as relate to their inroads and devastations". Most of our knowledge concerning the day-to-day lives of the Norse settlers in Dublin has been learned from extensive excavations at Wood Quay and in the neighbourhoods of Winetavern Street and Fishamble Street. The Norse built their houses almost exclusively out of perishable materials such as wood and straw, but many early buildings have been preserved in this area in a two-metre-thick waterlogged layer of estuarine mud, making Dublin one of the most important Norse sites in Europe. To date, more than two hundred houses have been excavated.

Among the few recent discoveries relating to this period are the graves of five young Viking warriors, one of which was found at Ship Street Great about 100 metres to the southwest of the Black Pool, the other four being clustered together on the southeastern shore near South Great George's Street. Radiocarbon analysis suggests that all five died in the 9th century, possibly before the establishment of a Viking longphort at Dublin. Oxygen isotope analysis has revealed that two of these warriors were from Scandinavia and two from somewhere in the British Isles, possibly the western coast of Scotland. In total, about one hundred Viking burials from this period have been unearthed in the Dublin region, but most of these discoveries were made serendipitously in the 19th century and few were properly excavated. Most of these burials were accompanied by typical Viking grave goods – swords, spear-heads, shields, daggers, penannular brooches and various decorative items – including hacksilver (i.e. small pieces of silver cut from coins or jewellery and used as currency).

Evidence for early Viking burials has also been recovered at Cork Street, Bride Street, Kildare Street, Dollymount and Donnybrook. More extensive cemeteries have been uncovered at Kilmainham, Islandbridge, Phoenix Park, Parnell Square and College Green, but it is thought that these date from the Second Viking Age after 902. The cemetery at College Green consisted of several burial mounds (Old Norse: haugr), which are thought to have contained the remains of some of the Norse kings of Dublin; the last of these mounds had been removed by the end of the 17th century.

== Longphort ==
Temple Bar West in the 9th century.

One of the enduring controversies in the history of Dublin concerns the existence and location of the longphort, or naval encampment, which the Annals of Ulster claim was established by the Vikings at Dublin in 841. The Annals refer to encampments at both Duiblinn and Áth Cliath, which has led some archaeologists to conclude that there were two such encampments at Dublin: one in the vicinity of the ecclesiastical settlement of Duiblinn, and one further upstream at or near Usher's Island and the Ford of Hurdles (áth cliath, from which the urban settlement took its name). It is possible, however, that the annalists were simply using two closely related names to describe one and the same longphort. Evidence for a late 9th-century settlement has been unearthed in the vicinity of Parliament Street in Temple Bar West, about 100 metres north of Dublin Castle. It appears that this early phase of settlement was confined to a small region at the confluence of the Poddle and the Liffey, bounded on the west by what are now Fishamble Street and Werburgh Street and on the east by the Poddle estuary, which roughly followed the course of today's Parliament Street. Parallels have been drawn between the Norse settlement of Dublin and that of Waterford, which also appears to have been established at the confluence of a major river and a minor tributary.

To date, no archaeological remains of any longphort or wintersetl have been unearthed; nevertheless, the possibility that there was no actual encampment in this early period can be discounted. A wealth of contemporary documentary evidence serves to confirm that throughout the second half of the 9th century Viking Dublin was a successful and thriving settlement from which numerous raids were launched throughout the country. Furthermore, a succession of warlords – many of them claiming the title King of Dublin – made Dublin their principal power-base, and from there launched a series of military campaigns against enemies in Ireland, Britain and further afield.

The most likely possibility is that the longphort was established on the gravel ridge overlooking the Black Pool – the most easily defended location in Dublin – and that its remains were subsequently buried or obliterated by the later 10th century settlement of Dyflinn, which was built in the same location (not to mention Dublin Castle, which presently occupies the site). The discovery of what are thought to be late 9th-century earthen banks in Ross Road and Werburgh Street (immediately west of Dublin Castle) lends some support to this theory. The other possibility is that the longphort was situated on the eastern or southern side of the Black Pool, and that Norse settlement began here, expanding northwards and westwards across the Poddle in the late 9th century. Norse houses to the west of these banks all appear to date from the Second Viking Age (917–1170). It is also a possibility that the location of the longphort was changed after the destruction of the original settlement in 849.

== Housing ==
The population of Dublin during the so-called "longphort phase" is estimated to have been quite considerable, amounting perhaps to several thousands. According to the annals, the Vikings of Dublin lost as many as 900 warriors at Carn Brammit in 847 without being overrun. It is assumed that streams of new immigrants from Britain and Scandinavia sustained the early settlement in the face of almost continuous hostility on the part of the native Irish.

Like their Irish neighbours, the Norsemen of Dublin used the post-and-wattle method to construct their dwellings. A series of sturdy vertical posts were first driven into the ground; these were then interlaced with horizontal osiers, as in basketwork. A plaster of mud and dung was generally applied to the outer surfaces of the walls to seal them (wattle-and-daub). Finally, the roofs were thatched with straw. There was usually just one door, and no windows.

Typically, the houses were 10–50 m^{2} in ground area, and were often provided with small gardens or vegetable plots, as well as adjoining workshops and storehouses. Inside, the houses were sometimes partitioned with curtains or wooden partitions, but usually they consisted of a single room; furniture was spartan, consisting of little more than benches and store chests; floors were strewn with rushes or straw; the only source of heat or light (other than the doorway) was the hearth in the centre of the living room. Rush lights fuelled by mutton fat were available, but they were expensive. A shuttered hole in the roof served as a chimney.

Archaeological evidence suggests that in addition to the naval encampments, the Vikings established numerous scattered dwellings along both banks of the Liffey in the 9th and 10th centuries. Almost one hundred Viking burials have been uncovered at Kilmainham, Islandbridge, College Green, Parnell Square and in the Phoenix Park; in the majority of cases it cannot be determined whether they belong to the First or the Second Viking Age. The burials at Kilmainham and Islandbridge were associated with earlier Christian graveyards, though there was nothing about them to suggest that the deceased were other than pagan. In the opinion of a number of historians these burials are indicative of a significant early Viking settlement in this region, some three kilometres west of Áth Cliath; it is even possible that the longphort mentioned in the annals as being at Duiblinn or Áth Cliath was actually further upstream in this area.

A handful of domestic habitations from the same period have also been found at Temple Bar West in the heart of the modern city. Typically these early houses were sunken structures, or Grubenhäuser, with wattle-lined walls, stone or wattle floors, and no hearths. They were built on the left bank of the Poddle close to its confluence with the Liffey. At a later date – possibly in the 9th century – these sunken structures were filled in and replaced with more densely spaced post-and-wattle structures indicative of more intensive settlement. These later dwellings are now identified as Type I houses, characterised by the possession of a central hearth flanked by two raised benches or bedding areas, a roof supported by four internal posts, and a doorway at each end of the building. These houses have been compared to Norse dwellings that were built in the early 9th century at Kaupang in Vestfold, Norway.

Neighbouring houses were connected by wattle paths and there are some indications of formal property boundaries. Associated with these Type I houses were animal pens. Excavations at these and other sites have revealed a rural community of farmers, quite different from the urbanised and industrial community of the 10th century. The four burials excavated near South Great George's Street were also associated with domestic habitations, suggesting that the deceased had been members of a settled Norse community and not the fatalities suffered by a transient raiding party.

Late in the 9th century a large metalled road was laid down in the middle of the Temple Bar West site, connecting it with the Liffey. It is also thought that South Great George's Street follows the course of an early medieval route – or possibly even the eastern boundary of a longphort, assuming that there was a naval encampment along the eastern shore of the Black Pool at some stage in the settlement's early history.

== Clondalkin ==
Amlaíb is known to have built a fortress at Clondalkin, eight kilometres west of Áth Cliath. This was an important seat of Norse power for more than a century. Significantly, the fortress was built on the remains of an old monastic site, which has led some historians to wonder whether a similar thing might not have happened at the ecclesiastical enclosure of Duiblinn. The annals are silent as to the ultimate fate of the latter settlement and its community – no Abbot or Bishop of Dublin is mentioned after 785; the possibility remains that it was abandoned in the late 8th century before the arrival of the Norsemen, who simply annexed it and built their longphort on the site.

In 867 a force led by the king of Loígis Cennétig mac Gaíthéne burned the fortress at Clondalkin and killed 100 of Amlaíb's followers.

Viking activity in the Dublin region is also indicated by the discovery of numerous silver-hoards in the east and midlands of Ireland.

== See also ==
- History of Dublin
- History of Dublin to 795
- History of Ireland (800–1169)

== Notes ==
AB = Annals of Boyle; AClon = Annals of Clonmacnoise; AFM = Annals of the Four Masters; AI = Annals of Inisfallen; ASC = Anglo-Saxon Chronicle; AU = Annals of Ulster; CGG = Cogad Gáedel re Gallaib; CS = Chronicon Scotorum; FAI = Fragmentary Annals of Ireland
