= Domnall mac Áeda Muindeirg =

Domnall mac Áeda Muindeirg (died 804) was a chief of the Cenél Conaill of the northern Uí Néill in modern County Donegal and sometimes styled "King of the North". He was the son of Áed Muinderg (died 747) and grandson of the high king Flaithbertach mac Loingsig (died 765).

== Life ==
During the eighth century the Cenél Conaill vied with the rival Cenél nEógain for supremacy in the north. His father had been recognized as King of the North as the representative of the high king Domnall Midi (died 763) of the Clann Cholmáin of the southern Ui Neill. However his successors were not and in 763 Niall Frossach (died 778) of the Cenél nEógain had acquired the high kingship of Ireland.

Domnall succeeded his uncle Murchad mac Flaithbertaig as King of the Cenél Conaill upon his assassination in 767. Domnall began to make a bid for supremacy in the north upon the abdication of Niall Frossach in 770 or 772. In 779 the new high king Donnchad Midi (died 797) of Clann Cholmáin made an expedition to the north and took hostages from Domnall who is given the title King of the North in the annals at this time. Domnall asserted his authority with a victory over the Cenél mBógaine, (a branch of the Cenél Conaill in the barony of Banagh, County Donegal) in 784.

In 787 Domnall was defeated in battle by Máel Dúin mac Áedo Alláin (died 788) of the Cenél nEógain and lost his supremacy in the north. Upon the death of Máel Dúin, Domnall made a bid to ragain his supremacy but was defeated in 789 at the Battle of Clóitech (now Clady on the River Finn) by Áed Oirdnide (died 819) of the Cenél nEógain. Áed Oirdnide became high king of Ireland in 798. Domnall was recognized as King of the North in his death notice in the annals in 804 but the circumstances of how he recovered the title are not known.
