= Muirecán mac Diarmata =

Muirecán mac Diarmata (died 863) was a King of Leinster of the Uí Fáeláin sept of the Uí Dúnlainge branch of the Laigin. This sept had their royal seat at Naas in the eastern part of the Liffey plain, Airthir Liphi. He was the son of Diarmait mac Ruadrach (died 832), King of Airthir Liphi. His uncle Muiredach mac Ruadrach (died 829) and grandfather Ruaidrí mac Fáeláin (died 785) were Kings of Leinster.

The succession of kings in Leinster is difficult to follow in his time. The king lists in the Book of Leinster have him listed after two kings who died later than he (869 and 885) and the next king is Túathal mac Máele-Brigte who died in 854. Another previous king was Ruarc mac Brain who died in 862. The king list gives Muirecán a reign of one year which would coincide to 862-863. Francis John Byrne suggests that the root of this apparent confusion lay in the fact that the Uí Dúnlainge kings exercised little real authority due to the aggressions of their western neighbour Cerball mac Dúnlainge (died 888), King of Osraige. Cerball, while unable to install himself as king of Leinster, was able to prevent any rival king exercising real power there.

In his obit in the annals in 863 it states that he was killed by the Norsemen. He is only accorded the title of King of Naas and Airthir Liphi.

His sons Domnall mac Muirecáin (died 884) and Cerball mac Muirecáin (died 904) were also kings of Leinster, while his son Máel Mórda mac Muirecáin (died 917) was king of Airthir Liphi.
