= Murchad mac Flaithbertaig =

Murchad mac Flaithbertaig (died 767) was a chief of the Cenél Conaill of the northern Uí Néill in modern County Donegal. He was the son of the high king Flaithbertach mac Loingsig (died 765) who abdicated in 734 and retired to the monastery at Armagh.

Murchad succeeded his brother Loingsech mac Flaithbertaig (died 754) as chief of the Cenél Conaill in 754. His brother Áed Muinderg (died 747) had been recognized as King of the North as the representative of the high king Domnall Midi (died 763) of the Clann Cholmáin of the southern Ui Neill. However Loingsech did not succeed to this title and neither did Murchad and they were only called king of the Cenél Conaill at their death notices in the annals. During Murchad's reign the rival Cenél nEógain had acquired the kingship in the person of Niall Frossach (died 778) in 763. The annals record that Murchad was killed in 767 but give no details.

His son Máel Bresail mac Murchada (died 819) was also King of the Cenél Conaill.
