= Loingsech =

Loingsech, an Irish language male name meaning exile or sailor, might refer to:

- Labhraidh Loingseach, a legendary high king of Ireland and ancestor of the Laigin
- Loingsech mac Colmáin (died 655), king of Leinster
- Loingsech mac Flaithbertaig (died 754), chief of the Cenél Conaill
- Loingsech mac Óengusso (died 704), high king of Ireland
