= Fínsnechta Cethardec =

Finsnechta Cethardec mac Cellaig (died 808) was a King of Leinster of the Uí Dúnchada sept of the Uí Dúnlainge branch of the Laigin. He was the son of Cellach mac Dúnchada (died 776), a previous king. He ruled from 795 to 808. His byname Cethardec meant "four-eyes".

On 6 May 795 the previous king Bran Ardchenn mac Muiredaig of the Uí Muiredaig sept and his queen Eithne were assassinated (by burning) in a church at Cell Cúile Duma (near Stradbally, Co.Leix) by Finsnechta Cethardec mac Cellaig (died 808) of the Uí Dúnchada sept. This was a ruthless political gesture directed at the high king Donnchad Midi (died 797) (Eithne was his sister). By this act Finsnechta acquired the throne of Leinster.

In 804 the high king Áed Oirdnide (died 819) of the Cenél nEógain led a battle into Leinster and won the submission of Finsnechta. Aed assembled the forces of Leth Conn at Dún Cuair on the Leinster border and attacked Leinster twice in one month. The Annals of the Four Masters say of this event: "Afterwards he returns to Leinster, Aedh, a soldier who shunned not battles; The robber king did not cease till he left them in dearth."

The high king did not appear satisfied with this submission and returned in 805 and deposed Finsnechta. He installed Muiredach mac Ruadrach (died 829) of the Uí Fáeláin and Muiredach mac Brain (died 818) of the Uí Muiredaig as joint kings. Finsnechta took refuge with Muirgius mac Tommaltaig (died 815), the King of Connacht who then aided him in recovering his throne in 806. Finsnechta recovered the throne by defeating the sons of Ruaidrí mac Fáeláin (died 785), Muiredach and Diarmait.

Finsnechta set about ensuring his control of the church of Kildare. This led to hostility with the Uí Failgi of Offaly. In 803 Óengus mac Mugróin, king of Uí Fhailgi, was treacherously killed by Finsnechta's followers and in 806 when he recovered the Leinster throne, the Uí Failgi king, Flaithnia mac Cináeda, was killed in his fort at Rathangan. Two of his brothers, Fáelán (died 804) and Áed (died 829), a nephew and a grandnephew all enjoyed the abbacy of Kildare in the 9th century and Finsnechta's sister Muirenn (died 831) was abbess of Kildare.
