= Cellach mac Brain =

Irish king

Cellach mac Brain (died 834) was a King of Leinster of the Uí Muiredaig sept of the Uí Dúnlainge branch of the Laigin. This sept had their royal seat at Maistiu (Mullaghmast) in South Kildare. He was the son of Bran Ardchenn mac Muiredaig (died 795), a previous king and brother of Muiredach mac Brain (died 818). He ruled from 829 to 834.

Cellach's brother Muiredach ruled as co-king with Muiredach mac Ruadrach (died 829) of the Uí Fáeláin sept from 808 to 818. In 814 Muiredach and Cellach won a victory over the Uí Cheinnselaig of south Leinster. Upon the death of Muiredach, the other Muiredach mac Ruadrach became sole ruler until 829 at which time Cellach became king.

In August, 833 Cellach attacked the community of Kildare killing many. Common hostility to Kildare may show that Cellach was in sympathy with Feidlimid mac Cremthanin (died 847) of Munster for political or religious reasons. In 831 the men of Laigin had joined Feidlimid in a campaign that plundered Brega. That same year the high king Conchobar mac Donnchada (died 833) of Clann Cholmáin plundered the Liffey in retaliation.

His son Lorcán mac Cellaig (fl. 848) was also king of Leinster. The later kings of the Uí Muiredaig descended from his brother Muiredach.
