= Invasion of Ireland =

The term Invasion of Ireland can refer to several attempted invasions of the island of Ireland including:

- Lebor Gabála Érenn, The Book of Invasions, describing mythological conquests of Ireland, anonymously compiled in the late 11th century
- Viking invasions of Ireland (8th–11th century)
- Norman invasion of Ireland led by the Earl of Pembroke, supported by King of Leinster, Dermot McMurrough (12th century)
- Scottish invasion by Edward Bruce (1315–18)
- English invasion of Ireland (1399), invasion by Richard II following which he was deposed by Henry IV
- Tudor conquest of Ireland, invasion begun by Henry VIII of England after he was declared King of Ireland (16th century)
- Spanish Landing in Ireland by Habsburg Spain, during the Nine Years' War (October 1601)
- Cromwellian conquest of Ireland, invasion of Ireland by English Parliamentarians during the Wars of the Three Kingdoms (1649–53)
- The French expedition to Ireland by the French First Republic (December 1796)
- The French invasion of Ireland during the Irish Rebellion of 1798
- Operation Green, planned but ultimately postponed and then cancelled invasion by Nazi Germany during World War II
