= Tomrair =

Ninth-century viking

- Tomrair's name and titles as they appear on folio 318r of Dublin Royal Irish Academy C iii 3 (the Annals of the Four Masters).

Tomrair (died 848) was a ninth-century Viking active in Ireland. (Note: Since the 2000s, academics have accorded Lagmann various personal names in English secondary sources: Thórer, Thorir, Thórir, Tomar, Tomrair erell, Tomrair Erell, Tomrair, Tomrar, and Þórir.) He is one of the first Vikings recorded by Irish sources. Tomrair is reported to have been killed at the Battle of Sciath Nechtain, a conflict in which twelve hundred Vikings were slain, battling the combined forces of Ólchobar mac Cináeda, King of Munster and Lorcán mac Cellaig, King of Leinster, in 848.

Surviving accounts of Tomrair's demise accord him the Gaelic title erell, making him the first earl noted by Irish sources. In fact, erell is the first Nordic loanword on record. Tomrair is also described as the tánaise ríg of Laithlind, which could mean that he was either an heir or deputy to the King of Laithlind. The accounts of Tomrair's final fall are the earliest annalistic references to the office of tánaise ríg. The precise identity of the King of Laithlind, or even location of Laithlind itself, is uncertain.

The context of Tomrair's fall is likewise uncertain. The year after his death, the King of Laithlind is reported to have sent a force of Vikings to contend with Vikings already settled in Ireland. In the years immediately after this, a group of Vikings called Dubgaill are noted to have battled another group called Finngaill. Afterwards in 853, a certain Amlaíb, described as the son of the King of Laithlind is stated to have won the submission of the Vikings in Ireland, and to have gained tribute from the Irish. It is uncertain if the Vikings of Laithlind are to identical to the Finngaill or Dubgaill. In the years that followed, three Vikings appear to have shared the kingship of Dublin: Amlaíb, Ímar, and Auisle. These men could well have been related to each other, and there is reason to suspect that Tomrair was yet another relation as well.

The year of Tomrair's death is remarkable in the fact that the Irish won several battles against the Vikings. Tomrair's eminent standing as a Viking tánaise ríg could indicate that it was his defeat and death that is referred to by a Frankish annal in 848. It is possible that a hoard of Carolingian coins, unearthed at Mullaghboden in the nineteenth century, may have been deposited in the context of Tomrair's defeat. These coins appear to have been looted from Aquitaine only a few years before by Vikings from Vestfold.

Tomrair may be associated with the "ring of Tomar", an object that was looted from Dublin in 994, along with the "sword of Carlus". These objects appear to have formed part of the royal insignia of Dublin, and may have been symbols of the Uí Ímair dynasty descended from Ímar. At about the same time that the ring appears on record, the Dubliners are described in Irish poetry as the "race of Tomar" and "Tomar's nobles". If these designations are not references to Þór, a Nordic deity, they may refer to Tomrair.

== Attestations and death ==
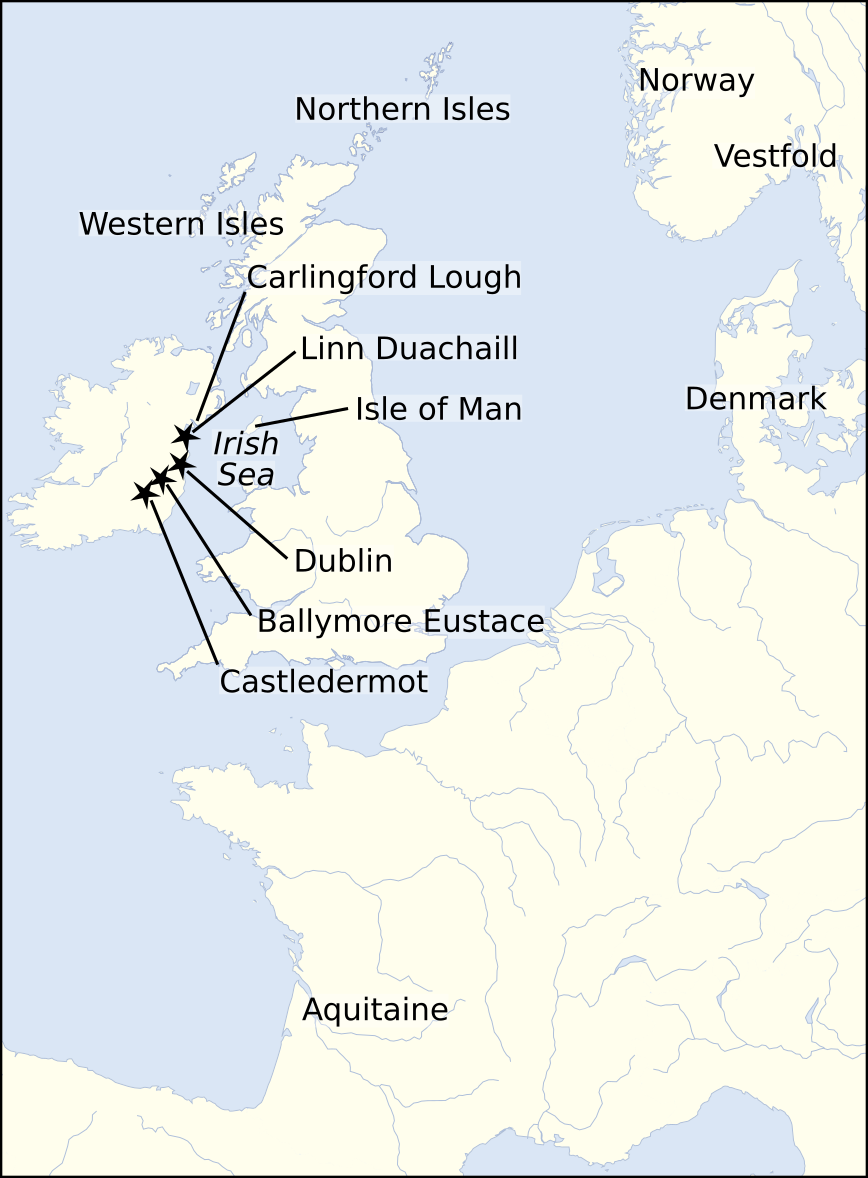
Locations relating to Tomrair's life and times.

Tomrair died in 848. His death is reported by the eleventh–fourteenth-century Annals of Inisfallen, the seventeenth-century Annals of the Four Masters, the fifteenth–sixteenth-century Annals of Ulster, and the twelfth-century Chronicon Scotorum. These accounts reveal that Tomrair—accorded the title of earl, and described as tánaise ríg of Laithlind—fell with twelve hundred Vikings at the Battle of Sciath Nechtain, a conflict evidently fought at Skenagun in the parish of Castledermot. Tomrair's troops were pitted against the combined forces of two of the most powerful provincial kings of Ireland: Ólchobar mac Cináeda, King of Munster (died 851) and Lorcán mac Cellaig, King of Leinster (fl. 848). (Note: Tomrair's fall against the Irish is also noted by the hypothesised Chronicle of Ireland, the twelfth-century pseudo-historical Caithréim Chellacháin Chaisil, and the twelfth-century Cogad Gáedel re Gallaib.)

The King of Laithlind may be identical to the King of the Foreigners attested by the Irish annals in the following year. According to various annalistic accounts, the said king sent a fleet of one hundred and forty ships overseas to contend with Vikings already settled in Ireland. (Note: This intervention of the King of Laithlind is also noted by the Chronicle of Ireland.) In 851, a contingent of Dubgaill are stated to have arrived in Dublin, where they defeated the Finngaill before overcoming them again at Linn Duachaill. The year after that, the Dubgaill are again reported to have crushed the Finngaill, this time at Carlingford Lough. (Note: This conflict is also noted by the eleventh-century Fragmentary Annals of Ireland.) In 853, Amlaíb (fl. c. 853–871), the son of the King of Laithlind, is reported to have arrived and Ireland, where the Vikings are stated to have submitted to him, and the Irish are reported to have rendered him tribute. (Note: This event is also reported by the Fragmentary Annals of Ireland, and Cogad Gáedel re Gallaib.) Although the annal-entries that report this event are the first specific notices of Amlaíb by name, he may well have commanded the Vikings of Laithlind in the earlier attested conflicts.

== Context ==
=== Familial relations and rank ===
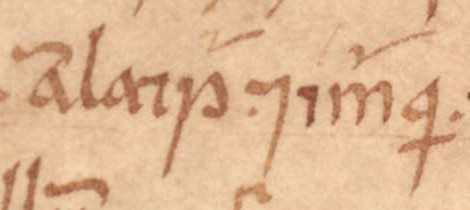
The names of Amlaíb and Ímar, two of the three Viking co-kings of Dublin, as they appear on folio 25v of Oxford Bodleian Library Rawlinson B 489 (the Annals of Ulster).

Thereafter, Dublin was evidently ruled by three kings: Amlaíb, Ímar (died 873), and Auisle (died 867). There is reason to suspect that the three were brothers. The eleventh-century Fragmentary Annals of Ireland certainly claims that the three were brothers, (Note: Although no other source specifically identifies these three as brothers, the Annals of Ulster reports that Auisle was killed parricidio a fratribus ("by kinsmen in parricide"), whilst the Fragmentary Annals of Ireland casts specific blame upon Amlaíb and Ímar. Nevertheless, this corroboration could stem from the fact that the composer of the Fragmentary Annals of Ireland invented the detailed account of Auisle's demise, and based it upon the accounts of earlier annals.) and specifically identifies the father of Amlaíb and Ímar as a man named Gofraid.

The fact that several of Ímar's apparent descendants—the Uí Ímair—repeatedly bore forms of the personal names Albdann, Amlaíb, Auisle, and Ímar, could further be evidence of shared kinship. If Ímar is identical to Ingware (died 869/870?)—a like-named leader of the Viking Great Army in Anglo-Saxon England—other brothers may include Albdann (died 877), and an unidentified Viking commander slain against the West Saxons in 878. The latter two are certainly described as Ingware's brothers by the ninth- to twelfth-century Anglo-Saxon Chronicle. (Note: According to the twelfth-century Estoire des Engleis, this unnamed brother was Ubba. Nevertheless, this identification may have been an assumption by the compiler of Estoire des Engleis, as earlier sources associate Ubba and Ingware together—in accounts of the killing of Edmund, King of East Anglia (died 869)—without identifying the two as brothers.)

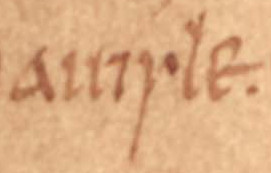
The name of Auisle, one of the three co-kings of Dublin, as it appears on folio 25r of Oxford Bodleian Library Rawlinson B 489. Tomrair could have been somehow related to these men.

Another brother could have been Tomrair himself. In any case, Tomrair could have been a member of the royal family of Laithlind, and specifically related to Amlaíb. The Fragmentary Annals of Ireland assigns Ímar the following pedigree: "Iomhar mc. Gothfraidh mc. Raghnaill mc. Gothfraidh Conung mc. Gofraidh". Although this pedigree may not be accurate, Gofraid, the alleged father of Amlaíb and Ímar, may well have been an historical figure. This man could be identical to the like-named King of Laithlind whose death is recorded by the Fragmentary Annals of Ireland. Although the identity of King of Laithlind is nevertheless uncertain, it is clear that Tomrair was himself a very important man. He is one of the earliest Vikings named by Irish sources. (Note: The first Vikings attested by the Annals of Ulster are Saxolb (died 837), Tuirgéis (died 845), Agonn (died 847), and Tomrair himself. The annal-entries that note these men all concern the record of their violent deaths in the 830s and 840s. The first living Viking named by the Annals of Ulster is Stain (fl. 852) in the 850s.)

The earliest instance of the Gaelic title erell (later ı́arla) is the account of Tomrair's demise reported by the Annals of Ulster. The term itself, meaning "earl", is derived from the Old Norse jarl, and is the first Nordic loanword on record in Old Irish. The Scandinavian title of jarl referred to a king's subordinate or deputy, a man who held some form of vice-regal authority over a particular region. (Note: The English earl is derived from the Old English eorl. In regard to the title of earl, eorl is a semantic loan from the Old Norse jarl. The native Old English eorl, meaning "brave man", "warrior", "leader", "chief", was otherwise confined to poetic use.)

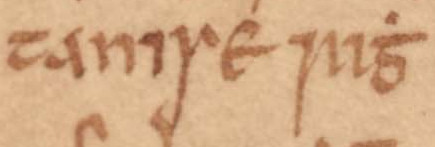
The title of tánaise ríg as it appears on folio 23v of Oxford Bodleian Library Rawlinson B 489.

The historical accounts of Tomrair are the earliest annalistic references to the office of tánaise ríg. (Note: The next record of the position occurs in 1138, when the fourteenth-century Annals of Tigernach reports that Mathgamain Ua Conchobair, King of Ciarraige (died 1138) was tánaise ríg of the Munster.) The precise meaning of this Gaelic title—forms of which are accorded to Tomrair by the Annals of the Four Masters, the Annals of Ulster, the Chronicle of Ireland, and Chronicon Scotorum—is uncertain. One possibility is that it means "awaited one of a king", "heir", "heir designate", "heir-designate", "designated successor", "heir apparent". "heir-apparent of a king", "king designate", or "royal heir". Another possibility is that it means "deputy", "military second-in-command", "representative", "second in command to a king", "second in rank or power", "second of a king", or "second to a king".

=== Laithlind, and the identity of the Dubgaill and Finngaill ===
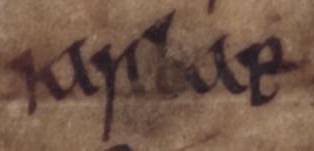
Tomrair's title as it appears on folio 14v of Bodleian Library Rawlinson B 503 (the Annals of Inisfallen).

The record of Tomrair's demise is the first notice of the term Laithlind utilised by the Irish annals. The location of the ninth-century Laithlind is uncertain. One possibility is that forms of the word refer to a Viking-controlled region of Scotland, the Northern Isles, the Western Isles, and the Isle of Man. Another possibility is that the term refers to Norway, or else a region within Norway. In later centuries, forms of the term Laithlind came to be replaced by forms of Lochlainn. It is unknown if the two terms originally had different meanings or if they were merely conflated. (Note: By the eleventh century, forms of Lochlainn certainly referred to Norway. In the annal-entries outlining the events of 848 and 853, the Annals of the Four Masters and the Fragmentary Annals of Ireland employ forms of Lochlainn instead of the forms Laithlind used by the other sources.) Whatever its true location, the fact that Tomrair is assigned the title tánaise ríg of Laithlind, coupled with the fact that Amlaíb is identified as the son of the King of Laithlind, seems to suggest that Laithlind was regarded as a well-defined kingdom as opposed to an obscure region.

The annal-entries of 848–853 can be interpreted in a variety of ways. On one hand, the accounts may be evidence that the Vikings from Laithlind were the earliest Vikings in Ireland, and that these people reasserted themselves in Ireland after a temporary takeover by the Dubgaill. If correct, Tomrair's demise in 848 may well have been seized upon by the Dubgaill early in the 850s, which in turn precipitated a retaliatory response from the King of Laithlind in the form of an 853 invasion to restore hegemony in Ireland. On the other hand, the annal-entries could instead indicate that the Dubgaill and the Vikings from Laithlind are identical, and that this group of incomers overcame Vikings previously established in Ireland. In either case, it is possible that the terms Dubgaill and Finngaill refer to the order of arrival. As such, the terminology attributed to one group of Vikings—the Dubgaill—may have been a way of distinguishing an incoming group of Vikings from an earlier-established group—the Finngaill. (Note: The fact that forms of Laithlind first appear on record in an annal-entry for 848, whilst Vikings are reported in the Irish Sea region since the late 700s, could indicate that the term refers to the newly arrived Vikings as opposed to those already active in the region.)

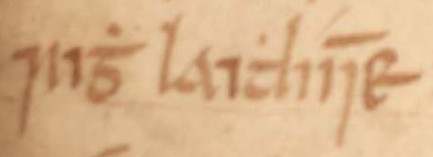
The title of the King of Laithlind as it appears on folio 24r of Oxford Bodleian Library Rawlinson B 489.

The specific meanings behind the Gaelic terms Dubgaill and Finngaill are uncertain. Literally, the former translates as "Dark Foreigners", whilst the latter translates as "Fair Foreigners". Whilst it is possible that the ninth-century forms of these terms refer to separate ethnicities or cultural groups—such as Danes and Norwegians respectively—the terms may instead refer to political power blocs specific to Britain and Ireland. For example, there is reason to suspect that the term Dubgaill merely denotes Vikings under the leadership of the associates and descendants of Ímar, whilst the term Finngaill refers to an older order of Vikings active in Ireland before the Dubgaill. Although it is possible that Amlaíb and Ímar were related, an alternate possibility is that the men merely came to an accommodation with each other as opposing representatives of the Dubgaill and Finngaill. As such, it is conceivable that Ímar represented the Dubgaill, whilst Amlaíb represented the Finngaill. If correct, Amlaíb's dramatic arrival in Ireland, following the temporary intrusion by the Dubgaill, would seem to have resulted in a period of reconciliation between both parties.

If the accounts of Tomrair, Amlaíb, and the Vikings of Laithlind refer to royal Norwegian intervention in Ireland, it is conceivable that had Tomrair held authority in Dublin, and that the King of Laithlind moved to regain control of the region after his demise. The subsequent actions of the Vikings of Laithlind may have been undertaken in the specific context of recovering control of an important node in their trade network. As such, there is reason to suspect that Viking trading centres such as Dublin were founded by powers in Scandinavia, as opposed to enterprising independent Vikings oversea. The conflict between the Finngaill and Dubgaill could be evidence of competition to control such trade nodes in the region. Such conflict between competing Danish and Norwegian interests in the Irish Sea region could also represent an early phase in the eventual consolidation of royal power in Norway.

== The "ring of Tomar" ==
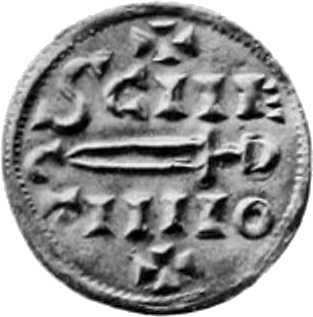
The obverse of an Anglo-Scandinavian coin bearing the image of a sword.

In time, the Uí Ímair possessed royal power in the Irish Sea region for centuries. There is reason to suspect that this dynasty reinforced its right to rule by way of royal insignia specifically recorded by the Irish annals. For example, when Dublin was invaded by Máel Sechnaill mac Domnaill, King of Mide (died 1022) in 994, the seventeenth-century Annals of Clonmacnoise, the Annals of the Four Masters, the fourteenth-century Annals of Tigernach, and Chronicon Scotorum, report that the Irish seized from the Dubliners the "sword of Carlus" and the "ring of Tomar". In 1029, when Mathgamain ua Riagáin is reported to have taken hostage Amlaíb, son of Sitriuc mac Amlaíb, King of Dublin, Mathgamain exacted a remarkable ransom that included the "sword of Carlus". The sword is last noted in 1058, when it was reported in the possession of Diarmait mac Maíl na mBó (died 1072), a man otherwise known to have brought both Dublin and the Isle of Man under his authority by 1060.

The various accounts of the sword and ring reveal that the objects were powerful ceremonial symbols, and important parts of Dublin's royal regalia. Swords and hammers are depicted upon some Anglo-Scandinavian coins. One possibility is that these symbols are identical to the "ring of Tomar" and "sword of Carlus", and are thus symbols of the Uí Ímair. The identities of Carlus and Tomar are nevertheless uncertain. The Gaelic Tomar may be a form of the Old Norse Þór, the name of a divine figure in Nordic mythology. The former is also a variant of the personal name Tomrair, which is in turn a Gaelicised form of the Old Norse personal name Þórir, a name itself derived from Þór.

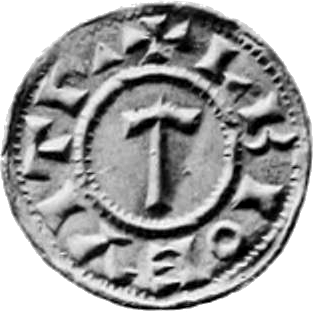
The reverse of an Anglo-Scandinavian coin bearing the image of a hammer.

On one hand, the Tomar of the ring may be the god Þór. It is possible that the eponym of the ring is identical to that of Caill Tomair ("The Wood of Tomar"), a forest seemingly situated north of Dublin, attested in the late tenth century by the Annals of Inisfallen, the Annals of Tigernach, the twelfth-century Cogad Gáedel re Gallaib, and Chronicon Scotorum. The wood has been specifically associated with Þór, and regarded to have been a place of pagan significance in Viking Age Ireland. If the ring was indeed a reference to a heathen cult object, the fact that only the sword is attested in the tenth century could indicate that an association between the dynasty and a pagan item was undesirable.

If the ring does not specifically refer to a pagan god, it could well refer to Tomrair himself. (Note: If the ring had pagan connotations, one possibility is that it was an emblem utilised by the goðar, a class of important secular figures and religious leaders in Scandinavian heathen society. If Tomrair was indeed associated with the ring, one possibility is that he was a goði. During the earliest decades of Scandinavian settlement of Iceland, from about 930 to 1030, there appear to have been roughly twice as many goðar who bore personal names beginning with the elements Þor and Þór than those who did not. During the Viking Age, about a quarter of the Icelandic population attested by Landnámabók bore names beginning with these elements. Two particular goðar, a certain Þorgrímr attested by the fourteenth-century Kjalnesinga saga (described as a "great sacrificer"), and a certain Þórólfr attested by the thirteenth-century Eyrbyggja saga, are said to have been devotees of Þór, and to have possessed oath-rings.) Although Irish sources reveal that at least three later Vikings bore the same name, Tomrair was clearly the most eminent of these individuals. Certain notices by the Annals of the Four Masters and the twelfth-century Lebor na Cert—specifically fragments of poetry coeval with the records of the sword and ring—respectively describe the Dubliners as the "race of Tomar" and "Tomar's nobles". If these specific instances do not refer to the pagan deity, it is possible that they refer to Tomrair himself, and reveal that his memory was held in high esteem by the ruling dynasty of Dublin.

The eponym behind the "sword of Carlus" is likewise uncertain. One possibility is that the name refers to the Frankish emperor Charlemagne. (Note: Some Anglo-Scandinavian coins bear Carolingian monograms.) Another possibility is that Carlus is identical to Carlus mac Cuinn meic Donnchada (died 960). Not only does this man appear to have been the grandson of a High King of Ireland, but he was also slain in Dublin. However, there may be a more likely candidate. Ímar's associate, Amlaíb, is known to have had two sons: one was Carlus, a man slain in 868; another was Oistin, a man slain by the Dubgaill commander Albdann, in 875. The latter Carlus could well be the eponym behind the "sword of Carlus". As such, Tomrair's certain connection with this man's father could be evidence that Tomrair is indeed the eponym behind the "ring of Tomar".

== Epilogue ==
Viking attacks on Irish churches attested by the Annals of Ulster
Decade	Raids
820s	8
830s	25
840s	10
850s	2
860s	2
870s	1
880s	1
890s	1
900s	0
Recorded reduction in the scale of Viking raids upon the Irish in the 840s.

Irish sources report that the Vikings suffered several remarkable defeats to the Irish in 848. For example, the record of a victory by Máel Sechnaill mac Máele Ruanaid, with seven hundred Viking dead; the notice of Tomrair's defeat against Ólchobar and Lorcán, with twelve hundred Viking dead; the record of a victory by Tigernach mac Fócartai, with another twelve hundred (or twelve score) Vikings slain; and the record of Vikings defeated by the Eóganacht Chaisil, with five hundred Vikings killed.

News of Irish successes are known to have reached the Frankish court in the following year, as the ninth-century Annales Bertiniani states that the Irish won a great victory against the Vikings, driving them out of their lands, and that the Irish sent an envoy to Charles II, King of the Franks (died 877), in an effort to negotiate an alliance and treaty with the Franks. Although any of the Irish victories of 848 could have inspired a Frankish chronicler to make note of the island, it could well have been Tomrair's eminent status—and his ultimate destruction—that was the true catalyst for this overseas annal-entry. In any case, there is a drastic decline in reported Viking attacks in Ireland after the 840s, and it is evident that the era of ninth-century massed Viking incursions was over for the Irish. By the 860s and 870s, however, the Vikings had turned their attention towards Anglo-Saxon England.

In 1871, a Viking Age hoard of at least eleven Carolingian coins was uncovered at Mullaghboden, near Ballymore Eustace. The hoard appears to have been originally deposited as early as about 847. This could mean that it was hidden by Vikings fleeing the Battle of Sciath Nechtain in 848. The hoard itself appears to have been composed of coins looted from Aquitaine only a few years previous, a haul possibly pillaged by the Viking fleet of Westfaldingi contemporaneously attested by the ninth–eleventh-century Annales Engolismenses. This force was evidently composed of men from Vestfold, a region of eastern Norway evidently under Danish overlordship during the ninth century.
