= Cathal mac Muirgiussa =

Cathal mac Muirgiussa (died 839) was a King of Connacht from the Uí Briúin branch of the Connachta. He was the son of Muirgius mac Tommaltaig (died 815), a previous king. He was of the Síl Muiredaig sept of the Uí Briúin. He ruled from 833–839 succeeding his uncle Diarmait mac Tommaltaig (died 833).

His reign coincided with the renewal of Norse raids and in 836 the Vikings made a cruel devastation of all the lands of the Connachta from the Shannon and the west coast. In 838 Cathal's brother, Máel Dúin, was slain in a battle between the Connachta and the Norse.

In 837 the powerful King of Munster, Feidlimid mac Crimthainn (died 847), ravaged Uí Maine and invaded Connacht. However Cathal threw back this invasion in Mag nAi (a plain in central County Roscommon).

The virtual hereditary kingship that his father had established was broken upon his death but became restored when his nephew Conchobar mac Taidg Mór (died 882) became king c. 855.
