= Máel Dúin mac Áedo Alláin =

Máel Dúin mac Áedo Alláin (died 788) was a King of Ailech and head of the Cenél nEógain branch of the northern Uí Néill. He was the son of Áed Allán (died 743), a high king of Ireland. He ruled from 770 to 788.

His uncle, the high king Niall Frossach (died 778), abdicated in 770 or 772 at which time Máel Dúin became King of Ailech. Expeditions by the new high king, Donnchad Midi (died 797) of Clann Cholmáin of the southern Uí Néill, to assert his authority in the north are recorded in 771 and 772. The killing of his uncle Conchobar in 772 is also recorded.

Authority in the north during the time of Donnchad Midi appears to have been held by the rival Cenél Conaill in the person of Domnall mac Áeda Muindeirg (died 804) who had the title King in the North in the annals in 779. In 787 however, Máel Dúin defeated Domnall and the Cenél Conaill in the battle and wrested the overlordship of the north from him. At his death obit in 788, Máel Dúin had the title King of In Fochla or King of the north.

His son Murchad mac Máele Dúin (died 823) was a King of Ailech. He was succeeded as King of Ailech by his cousin Áed Oirdnide (died 819) who became high king in 797.
