= Bran Ardchenn =

Bran Ardchenn mac Muiredaig (died 795) was a King of Leinster of the Uí Muiredaig sept of the Uí Dúnlainge branch of the Laigin. He was the son of Muiredach mac Murchado (died 760), a previous king. This sept had their royal seat at Maistiu (Mullaghmast) in South Kildare. He ruled from 785-795.

Bran was a rival of Ruaidrí mac Fáeláin (died 785) of the Uí Fáeláin sept for the throne. In 780 the high king Donnchad Midi (died 797) campaigned against Leinster and defeated Ruaidrí mac Fáeláin, devastating the territory of his adherents. That same year a congress of the synods of Uí Néill and Laigin was held at Tara and peace was restored. Donnchad may have been campaigning in the interests of Bran and he may have been installed as king at this congress.

In 782 Bran was defeated and captured at the battle of Curragh (near Kildare) by Ruaidrí. Brans's allies Mugrón mac Flainn, king of Uí Failgi, and Dub dá Crích son of Laidcnén of the Uí Cheinnselaig were slain. Bran succeeded to the throne in 785.

Bran had married Eithne ingen Domnaill (died 795), the sister of Donnchad Midi, the high king of the Clann Cholmáin. This relationship ensured good relations with the high king during his reign. In 794 Donnchad led a hosting into Munster to protect the Laigin.

On 6 May 795 Bran and Eithne were assassinated in a church at Cell Cúile Duma (near Stradbally, Co. Leix) by his successor Fínsnechta Cethardec mac Cellaig (died 808) of the Uí Dúnchada sept. This was a ruthless political gesture directed at the high king Donnchad.

His sons included Muiredach mac Brain (died 818) and Cellach mac Brain (died 834), both kings of Leinster.
