= Áed Oirdnide =

King of Ailech, Ireland (died 819)

Áed mac Néill (Old Irish pronunciation: [ˈaːi̯ð mak ˈnʲeːl̠ʲ]; died 819), commonly called Áed Oirdnide ("the anointed"), was King of Ailech. A member of the Cenél nEógain dynasty of the northern Uí Néill, he was the son of Niall Frossach. Like his father, Áed was reckoned High King of Ireland. He was King of Ailech from 788 onwards and High King of Ireland from 797.

== King of Ailech ==
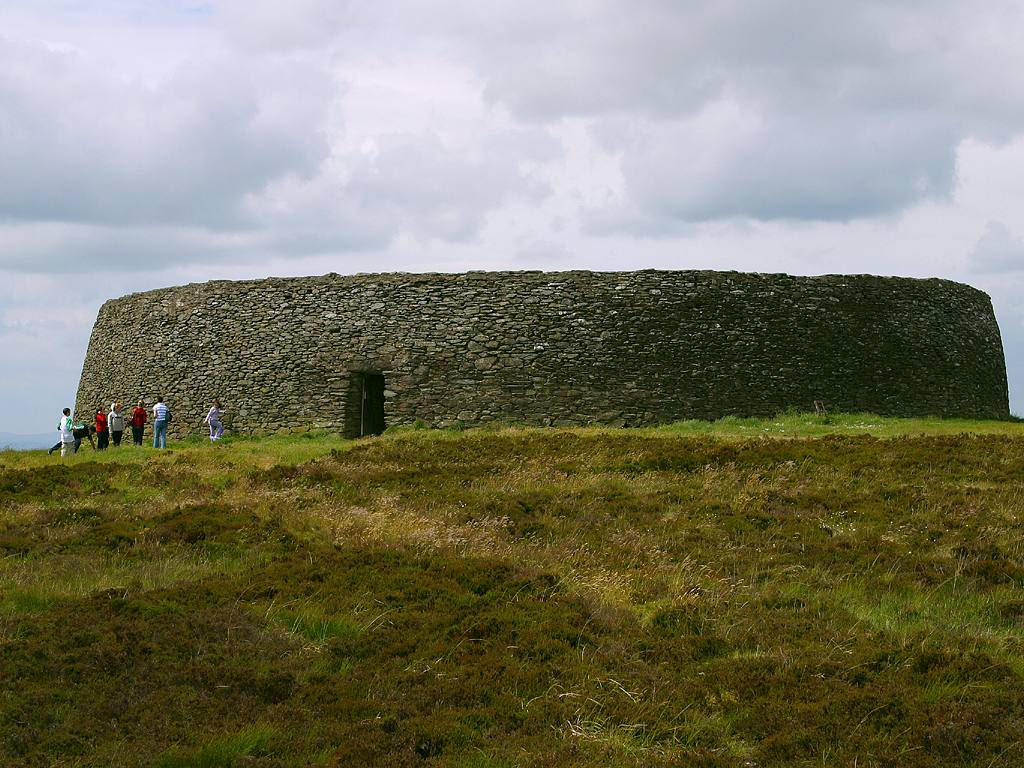
The Grianan of Aileach, a stone cashel reconstructed in 1878; the original structure here may have possibly dated from Áed's time.

The conflict between Cenél nEógain and Cenél Conaill for the leading role in the north appears to have turned on control over the lands of the minor Cenél nEndai branch of the Uí Néill which lay around Raphoe. Communications between the northern and southern branches of Cenél Conaill, respectively based on the north-west coast of Donergal and in the south around Donegal town, ran through these. While Cenél nEndai were clients or allies of Cenél Conaill, as they had been before Áed Allán defeated Flaithbertach mac Loingsig in the 730s, Cenél Conaill had the upper hand, and provided kings of Tara and kings of the North. By the death of Niall Frossach, if not earlier, Cenél nEndai were again under the sway of Cenél Conaill.

The region was still disputed in 787 when Máel Dúin defeated Domnall and appears to have gained some recognition as king of the North as he is so styled at his death the following year. Áed succeeded Máel Dúin as king of Ailech, but was challenged by Domnall whom he defeated at the battle of Clóitech (modern Clady, County Tyrone) in 789. This appears to have been the final attempt by kings of Cenél Conaill to regain control of the lands around Raphoe which had been seized by Cenél nEógain.

The annals record a battle in 791 at Tailtiu, site of a major Uí Néill oenach, the oenach Tailten. The summoning of this gathering was one of the prerogatives of the High King at which he would demonstrate his power and standing. Whether Áed brought an army south to disturb the oenach, or whether the conflict was provoked by Donnchad, is unknown. The outcome was that Áed fled from Tailtiu and was pursued perhaps as far as Slane. Several of Áed's allies are said to have been killed, including the kings of two branches of Uí Chremthainn, an Airgíalla dynasty whose lands lay around Clogher and Clones.

It is on this occasion that the Chronicle of Ireland calls Áed Áed Ingor, Áed the Unfilial or Áed the Undutiful, the only byname used in early sources. It is generally supposed that this refers to his conflict with his father-in-law Donnchad Midi, although the term mac ingor, a term from early Irish law, usually refers to the undutiful son who does not support his biological father. Whatever the origin of the name may have been, it is plainly not flattering.

In 794 Áed is recorded as campaigning against the Mugdorna Maigen at a time when Donnchad was involved in war with Munster. The lands of Mugdorna Maigen lay around the upper reaches of the River Fane, with the chief church at Donaghmoyne, County Monaghan. Although reckoned one of the nine tribes of the Airgíalla, the Mugdorna were clients of the southern Síl nÁedo Sláine branch of the Uí Néill rather than of Áed's Cenél nEógain dynasty like most of the Airgíalla.

== King of Tara ==
Although Donnchad's authority waned in the last decade of his life, he remained the dominant figure until his death on 6 February 797. Following Donnchad's death, Áed moved to ensure that he would be recognised as king of Tara. He defeated two of Donnchad's brothers, Diarmait and Fínsnechta, along with another Fínsnechta, a son of Fallomon mac Con Congalt of Clann Cholmáin Bicc, at Druim Ríg (modern Drumree) in south Brega. A poem in the Annals of Ulster portrays this as vengeance for the death of Áed's uncle Áed Allán at the hands of Donnchad's father Domnall Midi at the battle of Seredmag in 743. Some time later in 797 Áed devastated Mide and the Annals of Ulster take this to mark the beginning of his reign.

In 802 Muiredach, king of Mide, died. He was the last of Donnchad Midi's known brothers. Áed led an army south to Mide where he divided the lands of Clann Cholmáin between two of Donnchad's sons, Ailill and Conchobar. If this was intended to reduce the power of potential rivals, it proved ineffective. Ailill and Conchobar met in battle in 803 at Rath Conaill (near modern Mullingar). Ailill was killed leaving Conchobar as sole king of Mide.

In 804 Áed turned his attention towards Leinster and devastated the area twice in one month. That same year Fínsnechta Cethardec (died 808), King of Leinster, submitted to him. However Áed was not satisfied with this and in 805 he made a hosting to Dún Cuair and installed Muiredach mac Ruadrach (died 829) and Muiredach mac Brain (died 818) as joint kings of Leinster. Finsnechta took refuge with Muirgius mac Tommaltaig (died 815), the King of Connacht, who then aided him in recovering his throne in 806.

In 808 Conchobar of Meath made a bid for the high kingship and was joined by King Muirgius of Connacht. They advanced as far as the assembly grounds of Tailtiu but on the appearance of Aed's army the allies dispersed. Áed pursued them and burned the borders of Mide. In 808 or 809 Áed again attacked Leinster but was defeated on the banks of the Liffey.

In 809 Áed campaigned against the Ulaid and defeated them ravaging from the Bann to Strangford Lough. The motive for this conflict was apparently the killing of Dúnchú, superior of the monastery of Tulach Léis (now Tullylisk near Banbridge, County Down), by the Ulaid. In 815 one of Áed's brothers, Colmán mac Néill, was killed by the Cenél Conaill, and Áed led an expedition against them in revenge.

In 818 Áed again assembled his forces at Dún Cuair and attacked Leinster, dividing Leinster between his two candidates, who were nevertheless unable to retain their positions. That same year the vice abbot of Cell Mór Enir (modern Kilmore, County Armagh) was killed by the Laigin. As a result, Áed led another expedition versus Leinster and laid waste the land of Cualu as far as Glenn dá Locha (Glendalough).

In 819 Áed died near Áth dá Ferta in the territory of Conaille Muirtheimne in modern County Louth.

== Church relations ==
In 804 a meeting of the synods of the Uí Néill in Dún Cuair was presided over by Condmach mac Duib dá Leithe (died 807), abbot of Ard Macha (Armagh), at which the clergy were freed from military obligations by Áed. It is possible that this was the assembly at which Áed was ordained as king. In 806 Áed had the law of Saint Patrick promulgated.

In 811 the fair of Tailtiu was prevented from being held by Áed due to a boycott by the clergy who were protesting an offence made against the community of Tallaght during Áed's campaign against Leinster in 809. Áed made amends to the community. The campaigns of Áed versus Ulaid in 809 and Leinster in 819 were part of Áed's desire to pose as champion of the church.

Áed had some difficulty with the Columban church as well when Mael Dúin son of Cenn Faelad, superior of Ráith Both (Raphoe) was killed in 817. The Columban church went to Tara to excommunicate Áed that year. This event probably had something to do with his campaign versus the Cenél Conaill in 815. Also in 818 Cuanu, abbot of Lugmad Louth, went into exile into the lands of Munster with the shrine of Saint Mochtae, fleeing before Áed.

== Family ==
Áed had married Euginis ingen Donnchada (died 802), daughter of Donnchad Midi. His son Niall Caille (died 846) was later king of Ailech and High king of Ireland. Another son Máel Dúin mac Áeda was also a King of Ailech.

== Notes ==
Áed Oirdnide Cenél nEógain
Regnal titles
| Preceded by Máel Dúin mac Áedo Alláin | King of Ailech; 788–819 | Succeeded by Murchad mac Máele Dúin |
| Preceded by Donnchad Midi | High King of Ireland; 797–819 | Succeeded by Conchobar mac Donnchada |
