= Muiredach mac Ruadrach =

Muiredach mac Ruadrach (died 829) was a King of Leinster of the Uí Fáeláin sept of the Uí Dúnlainge branch of the Laigin. This sept had their royal seat at Naas in the eastern part of the Liffey plain, Airthir Liphi. He was the son of Ruaidrí mac Fáeláin (died 785), a previous king. He ruled from 805-806 and again from 808-829.

In 805 the Leinster king, Fínsnechta Cethardec mac Cellaig (died 808) of the Uí Dúnchada sept was deposed by the high king Áed Oirdnide (died 819) of the Cenél nEógain who installed the Muiredach as king instead along with Muiredach mac Brain of the Uí Muiredaig sept.. Finsnechta took refuge with Muirgius mac Tommaltaig (died 815), the King of Connacht who then aided him in recovering his throne in 806. According to the Book of Leinster, Finsnechta recovered his throne by defeating the two sons of Ruaidrí - probably Muiredach and his brother Diarmait.

Upon the death of Finsnechta, the two Muiredachs then became the rulers. Upon the death of Muiredach mac Brain in 818, Muiredach mac Ruadrach became sole ruler. In the year of his co-rulers death, the annals record that the high king Áed Oirdnide again mustered his forces at Dún Cuair on the Leinster border and again attempted to divide the province among his appointees -the "grandsons" of Bran. It is not known who these grandsons and the known candidates were too young at this time. In 818 the Laigin were responsible for the killing of the prior of Cell Mór Enir (Kilmore, near Armagh) The next year in 819, Áed Oirdnide ravaged Leinster in revenge devastating Cualu as far as Glendalough.

In 820 the Laigin forces accompanied the new high king, Conchobar mac Donnchada (died 833) of Clann Cholmáin in his campaign versus his rival, Murchad mac Máele Dúin of the Cenél nEógain but no battle took place. Later, in 827, we find Muiredach involved in a disturbance at the fair of Colmán where he attacked the Laigin Desgabair or Uí Cheinnselaig of south Leinster.

His brother, Diarmait (died 832) succeeded him as ruler of the Uí Fáeláin sept and was called King of Airthir Liphe (eastern Liffey) in the annals. Diarmait's son, Muirecán mac Diarmata (died 863) was a king of Leinster.
