= Túathal mac Máele-Brigte =

King of Leinster

Tuathal mac Máele-Brigte (died 854) was a King of Leinster of the Uí Muiredaig sept of the Uí Dúnlainge branch of the Laigin. This sept had their royal seat at Maistiu (Mullaghmast) in South Kildare. He was possibly the son of Muiredach mac Brain (died 818), a previous king. However he is known as the son of Máel-Brigte in the annals, which person's identity is unknown.

The succession of kings in Leinster is difficult to follow in his time. The king lists in the Book of Leinster have Tuathal succeed his cousin Lorcán mac Cellaig and Tuathal is given a reign of three years giving a reign of 851–854. Byrne suggests that the root of this apparent confusion lay in the fact that the Uí Dúnlainge kings exercised little real authority due to the aggressions of their western neighbour Cerball mac Dúnlainge (died 888), King of Osraige. Cerball, while unable to install himself as king of Leinster, was able to prevent any rival king exercising real power there.

In his death obit in the annals in 854 it states that he was wickedly killed by his own kinsmen. He is only accorded the title of King of the Uí Dúnlainge.
