= Lochlann =

Gaelic term describing Scandinavia or its constituent states

In the modern Gaelic languages, Lochlann (Irish: [ˈl̪ˠɔxl̪ˠən̪ˠ]) signifies Scandinavia or, more specifically, Norway. As such it is cognate with the Welsh name for Scandinavia, Llychlyn (pronounced [ˈɬəχlɨn]). In both old Gaelic and old Welsh, such names literally mean 'land of lakes' or 'land of swamps'.

It may originally have referred to the mythical, undersea otherworldly abode of the Fomorians of Irish mythology. At times it may have referred to an early Norse settlement in Scotland.

Classical Gaelic literature and other sources from early medieval Ireland first featured the name, in earlier forms like Lothlend and Laithlind. In Irish, the adjectival noun Lochlannach (IPA: [ˈl̪ˠɔxl̪ˠən̪ˠəx], 'person belonging to Lochlann') has an additional sense of 'raider' or, more specifically, a Viking.

== Historical uses ==
All uses of the word Lochlann relate it to Nordic realms of Europe. While the traditional view has identified Laithlind with Norway, some have preferred to locate it in a Norse-dominated part of Scotland, perhaps the Hebrides or the Northern Isles. Donnchadh Ó Corráin states that Laithlinn was the name of Viking Scotland, and that a substantial part of Scotland—the Northern and Western Isles and large areas of the coastal mainland from Caithness and Sutherland to Argyll—was conquered by the Vikings in the first quarter of the ninth century and a Viking kingdom was set up there earlier than the middle of the century.

=== Ireland and the Suðreyjar ===
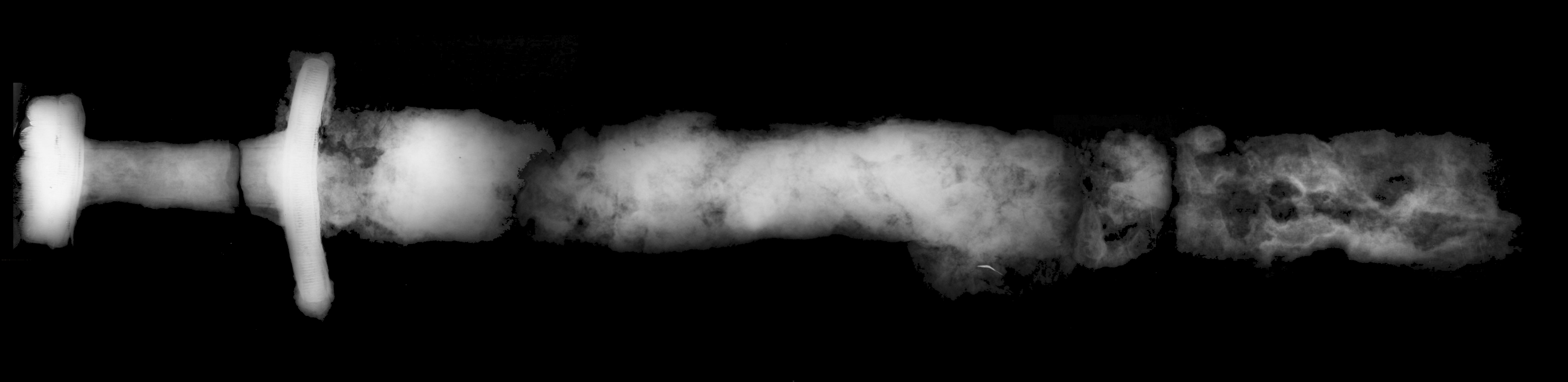
An x-ray image of the sword found at the Port an Eilean Mhòir ship burial.

The Fragmentary Annals of Ireland contain numerous reference to the Lochlanns, who are clearly Vikings and feared and distrusted by the writers. However relatively few named individuals are identified from amongst their number and their relationships with one another are largely obscure.

Jarl Tomrair, described as the "tanist of the king of Lochlann" fell in the Battle of Sciath Nechtain (near modern Castledermot) in 848.

In 851 Zain, also identified as the "half-king of the Lochlanns" and Iargna "the two chiefs of the fleet of the Lochlanns" are recorded as fighting against the Danes in Carlingford Lough. The same source notes that in the sixth year of the reign of Maelsechlainn, circa 852 Amlaíb "the son of the King of Lochlann, came to Erin, and he brought with him commands from his father for many rents and tributes, but he left suddenly. Imhar, his younger brother, came after him to levy the same rents." Amlaíb is also called the "son of the king of Laithlind" by the Annals of Ulster in 853. While certainly of Scandinavian origin – Amlaíb is the Old Irish representation of the Old Norse name Oláfr – the question of Amlaíb's immediate origins is debated. In 871 he "went from Erin to Lochlann to wage war on the Lochlanns" to assist his father Goffridh who had "come for him".

Hona, who the annalists believed was a druid and Tomrir Torra were "two noble chiefs", "of great fame among their own people", and "of the best race of the Lochlanns", although their careers appear to have been otherwise unrecorded. They died whilst fighting the men of Munster in 860.

Gnimbeolu, chief of the Galls of Cork, was killed in 865, possibly the same person as Gnim Cinnsiolla, chief of the Lochlanns who is recorded as dying in similar circumstances. In 869 Tomrark the Earl is described as a "fierce, rough, cruel man of the Lochlanns" and the annalist notes, perhaps with some satisfaction, that this "enemy of Brenann" died of madness at Port-Mannan (possibly the harbour of the Isle of Man) in the same year.

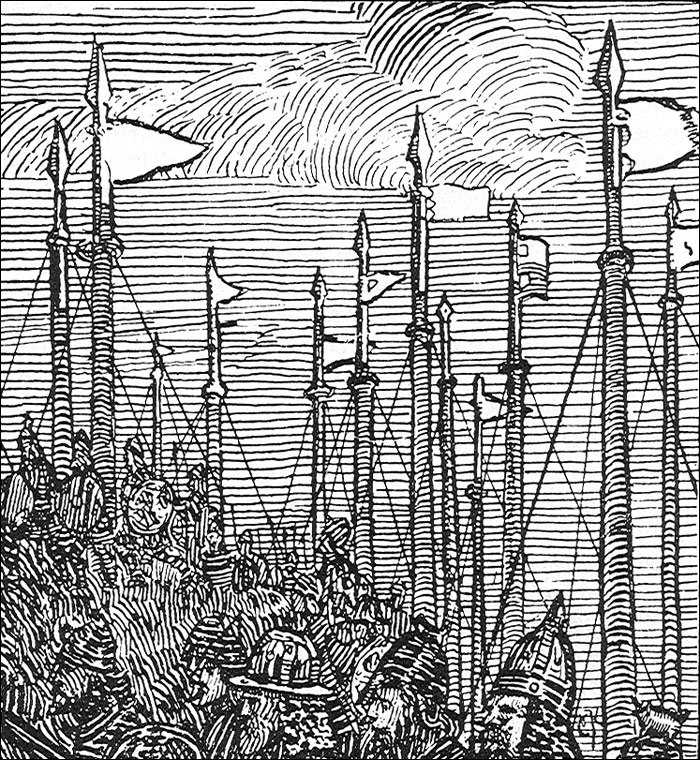
19th-century depiction of Magnus Barefoot's forces in Ireland.

Also in 869 the Picts were attacked by the Lochlanns and internal strife in Lochlann was recorded because:

the sons of Albdan, King of Lochlann, expelled the eldest son, Raghnall, son of Albdan, because they feared that he would take the kingdom of Lochlann after their father; and Raghnall came with his three sons to Innsi Orc and Raghnall tarried there with his youngest son. But his elder sons, with a great host, which they collected from every quarter, came on to the British Isles, being elated with pride and ambition, to attack the Franks and Saxons. They thought that their father had returned to Lochlann immediately after setting out.

This entry provides a number of problems. The demise of Gofraid, King of Lochlann and father of Amlaíb and Imhar (or Ímar) and Auisle seems to be recorded in the Fragmentary Annals in 873:

Ég righ Lochlainne .i. Gothfraid do tedmaimm grána opond. Sic quod placuit Deo. (The death of the king of Lochlainn i.e. Gothfraid of a sudden and horrible fit. So it pleased God.)

O' Corrain (1998) concludes that: "this much-emended entry appears to be the death notice of Gøðrøðr, king of the Vikings in Scotland" and although other interpreters believed this entry referred to the death of his son Ímar it is clearly about one of the other. Who then is "Albdan"? The name is probably a corruption of the Norse Halden, or Halfdane, and this may be a reference to Halfdan the Black. This would make Raghnall Rognvald Eysteinsson of More in Norway and the brother of Harald Finehair (although the Norse sagas claim that Halfdan was Raghnall/Rognvald's grandfather). The "Lochlanns" may thus have been a generic description for both Norwegian-based warriors and insular forces of Norse descent based in the Norðreyjar or Suðreyjar.

Other Lochlannachs mentioned in the texts for dates during the early 10th century are Hingamund (or Ingimund) and Otter, son of Iargna, who was killed by the Scots. Whatever the meaning of Laithlind and Lochlann in Ireland in the ninth and tenth centuries, it may have referred to Norway later. In 1058 Magnus Haraldsson is called "the son of the king of Lochlann", and his nephew Magnus Barefoot is the "king of Lochlann" in the Irish πreports of the great western expedition four decades later.

=== Wales ===
The Irish Lochlann has a cognate in the Welsh language Llychlyn, which appears as a name for Scandinavia in the prose tales Culhwch and Olwen and The Dream of Rhonabwy, and in some versions of Welsh Triad 35. In these versions of Triad 35 Llychlyn is the destination of the otherwise unattested Yrp of the Hosts, who depleted Britain's armies by demanding that each of the island's chief fortresses provide him with twice the men he brought; though he began with only two men he left with many thousands. The same versions also give Llychlyn as the destination of the army led by Elen of the Hosts and Maxen Wledig, the Welsh version of the historical Roman usurper Magnus Maximus. However, Rachel Bromwich suggests that Llychlyn in this case might be a corruption of Llydaw, or Armorica, Maxen's usual destination in other sources. In The Dream of Rhonabwy, a company from Llychlyn led by March ap Meirchiawn (the King Mark of the Tristan and Iseult legend) appears among Arthur's vividly-depicted host. Bromwich suggests this appearance derives ultimately from a recollection of Welsh Triad 14, which depicts March ap Meirchiawn as one of the "Three Seafarers/Fleet Owners of the Island of Britain" – the Scandinavians being famed for their nautical skills.

== Literary uses ==
Lochlann is the land of the Fomorians in the Irish Lebor Gabála Érenn. In the Lebor na hUidre and the Book of Leinster the "huge and ugly" Fomorians are sea demons that battled with the Tuatha De Danann.

A Scandinavian Lochlann appears in later Irish tales, generally concerning the King of Lochlann—sometimes called Colgán or Magnus—or his sons, such as in the tales of Lugh and the Fenian Cycle.

The Lebor Bretnach – a Gaelic adaption of the Historia Brittonum perhaps compiled at Abernethy—makes Hengist's daughter "the fairest of the women of all Lochlann". Hengist was a legendary Anglo-Saxon leader of the 5th century AD.

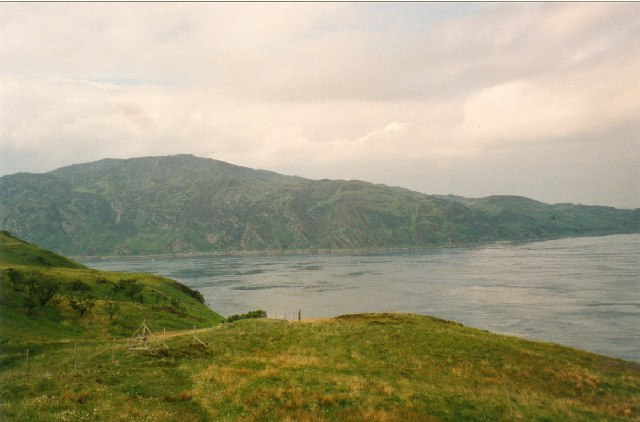
The Gulf of Corryvreckan between Jura and Scarba. According to tradition "Prince Breacan of Lochlann" was shipwrecked there with a fleet of fifty ships.

The adventures of Prince Breacan of Lochlann are part of the mythology of the naming of the Gulf of Corryvreckan (Scottish Gaelic: Coire Bhreacain), a whirlpool between the islands of Jura and Scarba on the west coast of Scotland. The story goes that the tidal race was named after this Norse Prince "said to be son to the King of Denmark" who was shipwrecked there with a fleet of fifty ships. Breacan is reputed to be buried in a cave at Bagh nam Muc (bay of the swine) at the north-western tip of Jura. According to Haswell-Smith (2004) Adomnan's Life of St Columba suggests this calamity occurred between Rathlin Island and the Antrim coast. W.H. Murray corroborates the view that the original story may have referred to this latter location, quoting the 10th century Glossary of Cormac who describes the tale of "Brecan, son of Maine, son of Nial Naoighhiallach".

The same story is associated with the Bealach a' Choin Ghlais (pass of the grey dog), a tidal race further north between Scarba and Lunga. The prince's dog managed to swim to land and went in search of his master. Failing to find him on Jura or Scarba he tried to leap across the strait to Lunga, but missed his footing on Eilean a' Bhealaich which sits in the middle of the channel between the two islands. He slipped into the raging current and drowned as well, giving his own name in turn to the strait where he fell.

== See also ==
- Dubgaill and Finngaill
- Is acher in gaíth in-nocht, a 9th-century Irish poem.
