= Áed Muinderg =

Áed mac Flaithbertaig (died 747), called Áed Muinderg, was a chief of the Cenél Conaill of the northern Uí Néill in Ireland. He was the son of the high king Flaithbertach mac Loingsig (died 765). His byname Muinderg means "red-necked".

His father Flaithbertach was the last Cenél Conaill high king of Ireland. He was deposed or abdicated in 734 in favor of the rival northern Ui Neill family, the Cenél nEógain, led by Áed Allán (died 743). His father later died as a monk at Armagh in 765.

Áed Allán was defeated and slain in the battle at Seredmag by Domnall Midi (died 763) of the Clann Cholmáin branch of the southern Ui Neill in 743. Domnall may have appointed Áed Muinderg as his deputy in the north and he is styled Rí in Tuaiscert, or "King of the North" in the Irish annals. As such his rule in the north lasted from 743 to 747.

His brothers Loingsech mac Flaithbertaig (died 754) and Murchad mac Flaithbertaig (died 767) were simply called chiefs of the Cenél Conaill. His son Domnall mac Áeda Muindeirg (died 804) was also called King of the North in the annals.
