= Murchad mac Máele Dúin =

Murchad mac Máele Dúin (flourished 819–833) was a King of Ailech and head of the Cenél nEógain branch of the northern Uí Néill. He was the son of Máel Dúin mac Áedo Alláin (died 788), a previous king and grandson of Áed Allán (died 743), a high king of Ireland. He ruled from 819–823.

He succeeded to the throne of Ailech upon the death of his cousin, the high king Áed Oirdnide in 819. However the high kingship passed back to the Clann Cholmáin of the southern Ui Neill in the person of Conchobar mac Donnchada (died 833). Murchad meanwhile had to deal with a challenge for supremacy among the northern Ui Neill. In 819 he defeated Máel Bresail mac Murchada of the rival Cenél Conaill who was slain in the skirmish.

In 820 Murchad made a bid for the high kingship and led a hosting of the northern Uí Néill to Druim ind Eich (near modern Dublin) while Conchobor with the southern Uí Néill and the Laigin moved northwards. However no battle ensued. In 822 Murchad made another bid for the high kingship and advanced with the men of the north to Ard Brecáin (County Meath). The men of Brega led by Diarmait mac Néill (died 826) of the Uí Chernaig sept of Síl nÁedo Sláine then went over secretly to Murchad and submitted to him at Druim Fergusa. Conchobor son of Donnchad invaded Brega and camped at Gualu. He invaded southern Brega again and a vast number of the men of southern Brega fell by him, and the Uí Chernaig submitted under compulsion. Murchad had Cumuscach son of Tuathal, king of Ard Ciannachta assassinated in 822 probably in retaliation for his failure.

In 823 Murchad's failures led to his deposition by his second cousin Niall Caille (died 846). Murchad seems to have accepted his fate and he is last heard of cooperating with Niall in routing out the Vikings in Daire Calgaig (Derry) in 833.

Murchad may have had a Norse wife and the genealogies name Erulb as his son which corresponds to old Norse Herulfr. Another son Ruadrí was father of Birn, ancestor of Clann Birn (or Muinter Birn) in the barony of Dungannon, County Tyrone.
