= Lorcán mac Cellaig =

Lorcán mac Cellaig (flourished 848) was a King of Leinster of the Uí Muiredaig sept of the Uí Dúnlainge branch of the Laigin. This sept had their royal seat at Maistiu (Mullaghmast) in the south of modern County Kildare. He was the son of Cellach mac Brain (died 834), a previous king.

The succession of kings in Leinster is difficult to follow in his time. The king lists in the Book of Leinster have Lorcán succeed Ruarc mac Brain (died 862) of the Uí Dúnchada sept and followed by Túathal mac Máele-Brigte (died 854). According to these lists Ruarc ruled for 9 years (c.838-847) and Túathal for 3 (c.851-854). Lorcán's reign then corresponds to c.847-851. Francis John Byrne suggests that the root of this apparent confusion lay in the fact that the Uí Dúnlainge kings exercised little real authority due to the aggressions of their western neighbour Cerball mac Dúnlainge (died 888), King of Osraige. Cerball, while unable to install himself as king of Leinster, was able to prevent any rival king exercising real power there.

In 848 Lorcán led the Laigin in alliance with Ólchobar mac Cináeda (died 851) in a victory over the Vikings in the Battle of Sciath Nechtain near modern Castledermot, County Kildare, in which fell the jarl Tomrair. Lorcán's father Cellach had also been aligned with Munster during the reign of Feidlimid mac Cremthanin (died 847).
