= Niall Frossach =

Irish king of Ailech

Niall Frossach (or Niall mac Fergaile) (718–778) was an 8th-century Irish king of Ailech, sometimes considered to have been High King of Ireland. Brother of high king Áed Allán (died 743), Niall was the son of high king Fergal mac Máele Dúin (died 722) and a member of the Cenél nEógain, a branch of the Northern Uí Néill. The epithet Frossach (showery) is said to come from showers of silver, honey and wheat which fell on his home at Fahan in Inishowen at his birth.

Upon the death of his brother he became King of Ailech. He ruled as King of Ailech from 743 to 770. However the new high king Domnall Midi (died 763) of the Clann Cholmáin branch of the southern Ui Neill appointed Áed Muinderg (died 747) of the rival Cenél Conaill as his representative in the North (Rí in Tuaiscert). In 756 conflict with Domnall broke out and Domnall led a force of Laigin with him as far as Mag Muirtheimne in modern County Louth. This region had been recently brought under overlordship by Niall's brother Áed Allán in 735.

Niall followed Domnall Midi as High King in 763. His reign was considered notably peaceful. The law of Saint Patrick was again proclaimed in force in 767. The Clann Cholmáin high kings had supported the Law of Columba of Iona. Domnall Midi's son Donnchad Midi (died 797) began to claim the throne of Tara in 770 when he campaigned against Leinster. Donnchad led a hosting to the north in 771 and 772. It is presumed that Niall abdicated sometime between 772 and 777 though possibly as early as 770. He died on Iona in 778.

He was followed as King of Ailech by his nephew, Máel Dúin mac Áedo Alláin (died 788) son of Áed Allán. The Kingship of Tara and supposed High Kingship passed back to Clann Cholmáin in the person of Donnchad Midi. Niall married Dunlaith ingen Flaithbertaich (died 798) of the Cenél Conaill, daughter of the high king Flaithbertach mac Loingsig (died 765) and their son Áed Oirdnide (died 819) was a high king.

His judgements are referenced in a poem by Tuileagna Ó Maoil Chonaire, Labhram ar iongnaibh Éireann, written some eight hundred years later.

== Notes ==
Preceded by Domnall Midi	High King of Ireland; 759–765	Succeeded by Donnchad Midi
