= Flaithbertach mac Loingsig =

High King of Ireland

Flaithbertach mac Loingsig (died 765) was a High King of Ireland. He was a member of the Cenél Conaill, a branch of the northern Uí Néill. He was the son of Loingsech mac Óengusso (died 703), a previous high king. He ruled from 728 to 734.

He is considered to have been High King of Ireland following his victory over the previous High King, Cináed mac Írgalaig of the Síl nÁedo Sláine, at the battle of Druim Corcain in 728 where Cináed was killed.

For much of Flaithbertach's reign his kingship was contested by his northern Uí Néill rival, Áed Allán of the Cenél nEógain. Áed's goal was the conquest of Mag nÍtha, a plain in the valley of the River Finn connecting northern and southern portions of Cenél Conaill territory. Prior to becoming high king he fought the Battle of Druim Fornocht with his rival in 727. In 732 Flaithbertach was defeated by Áed in battle in which Flaithbertach's cousin Flann Gohan mac Congaile was slain. Another encounter occurred in 733 in a battle fought in Mag nÍtha in which another cousin of Flaithbertach, Conaing mac Congaile was slain. This was followed by a further encounter in 734 in Mag nÍtha.

These defeats led Flaithbertach to call in the naval help of the men of Dál Riata but their fleet was destroyed at the mouth of the Bann in 734. The less reliable Annals of the Four Masters state that the Scots did arrive to help Flaithbertach's army cut off the enemy and that the Ulaid and the Cianachta Glenn Geimin were allies of Áed in this battle.

After these series of battles Flaithbertach was deposed, or abdicated, and entered the monastery at Armagh where he died in 765.

Flaithbertach was the last member of the Cenél Conaill to be generally counted as High King of Ireland, although Ruaidrí ua Canannáin (d. 950) is considered such by a minority of sources. Flaithbertach's sons included: Áed Muinderg (died 747) called King of the North; Loingsech mac Flaithbertaig (died 754) and Murchad mac Flaithbertaig (died 767) called chiefs of the Cenél Conaill. His daughter Dunlaith ingen Flaithbertaig (died 798) married the high king Niall Frossach (died 778).

== Notes ==
Preceded by Cináed mac Írgalaig	High King of Ireland; 728–734	Succeeded by Áed Allán
