= Loingsech mac Flaithbertaig =

Chief of the Cenél Conaill

Loingsech mac Flaithbertaig (died 754) was a chief of the Cenél Conaill of the northern Uí Néill in modern County Donegal. He was the son of the high king Flaithbertach mac Loingsig (died 765) who abdicated in 734 and retired to the monastery at Armagh.

Loingsech succeeded his brother Áed Muinderg (died 747) as chief of the Cenél Conaill in 747. His brother was recognized as King of the North as the representative of the high king Domnall Midi (died 763) of the Clann Cholmáin of the southern Ui Neill. However Loingsech did not succeed to this title and was only called king of the Cenél Conaill at his death notice in the annals.
