= Dubgaill and Finngaill =

Rival Viking groups in medieval Ireland

Dubgaill and Finngaill, or Dubgenti and Finngenti, are Middle Irish terms used to denote different rival groups of Vikings in Ireland and Britain. Literally, Dub-/Finngaill is translated as "dark and fair foreigners" or "black and white foreigners", and similarly, Dub-/Finngenti as "dark/black" and "fair/white heathens". Similar terms are found in Welsh chronicles, probably derived from Gaelic usage. The first known use of these terms in the chronicles is from 851, when it is noted that "The Dubhghoill arrived in Ath Cliath [Dublin], and made a great slaughter of the Finnghoill". (Note: AFM 849.9 [=851], similar AU 851.3 "Tetact Dubgennti du Ath Cliath co ralsat ár mór du Fhinngallaibh", translated as "The dark heathens came to Áth Cliath, made a great slaughter of the fair-haired foreigners") The terms appear, with various spellings, in entries in Irish annals from the 9th and 10th century, and are also used and interpreted in later historiography.

There have been different interpretations of the terms. Traditionally, historians have speculated whether these distinctions refer to physical features such as skin or hair-colour, weaponry or outfits. Alfred P. Smyth suggested a new interpretation of dub and finn as "new" and "old". There is a long tradition of understanding Dubgaill as Danish Vikings and Finngaill as Norwegian Vikings. This interpretation has recently been challenged by David N. Dumville and Clare Downham, who, building on Smyth's conclusions, propose that the terms may not be related to ethnicity or origin of the different groups of Vikings.

== Etymology ==
The word Gaill (plural of Gall) etymologically originates from "Gauls", who in pre-Viking Gaelic history were the archetypal "foreigners". Dumville says that "what [the Gauls] had done in Gaelic prehistory to gain that status is unknown and was probably unpleasant." During the Viking age, it came to denote Scandinavians or those of Scandinavian descent or speech. From the Norman invasion of Ireland in the late 12th century, this appellation was passed on to foreigners of French speech and then to the English at large. The word did not denote "foreigner" in the sense "anyone not Irish (Gaelic)", but the Saxons, Welsh and Picts are identified as such in the Irish annals, and there are also terms used which may identify the Scandinavians based on nationality, like Dene, Northmanni and Lochlainn. (Note: The accuracy of the early references to the homelands of the Scandinavians are controversial, for a thorough discussion on the identification of such terms in insular chronicling with later national entities like Norway and Denmark, see Downham (2009).)

Another word frequently used by the chroniclers in the early phase of the Viking age was Gen(n)ti, meaning "foreigner of a different religion". This was derived from the biblical usage of the Latin phrase gentes or gentiles, the latter form common in traditional English translations of the Bible. This terminology was abandoned, which has been taken as recognition of eventual conversion to Christianity.

The literary meaning of Old Irish and Old Welsh Dub is normally given as "dark" or "black", while Middle Irish finn (Old Irish find, Modern Irish fionn) is given as "light" or "white". Smyth, referring to the Dictionary of the Irish Language by the Royal Irish Academy, adds that Dub can mean "gloomy" or "melancholy" in a moral sense, and has the intensive meaning of "great" or "mighty". For finn there are the additional meanings of "handsome", "just" and "true".

== Interpretation history ==
=== The meaning of Finn- and Dub- ===
Historians have offered various explanations to account for the fact that terms associated with colour denote two separate factions of Vikings. The explanation which has been most widely accepted is that it either relates to hair-colour or armour. The view that it relates to colour was held, for instance, by the Danish antiquary Jens Jacob Asmussen Worsaae and James Henthorn Todd; but it also occurs in more modern historical works like in Mac Airt & Mac Niocaill's 1983 edition of Annals of Ulster where Fhinngallaibh is translated "fair-haired foreigners". According to Smyth, the most bizarre explanation of the terms was put forward by Jan de Vries. He suggested that the "Black foreigners" were Moorish slaves, carried off to Ireland in a Viking raid on North Africa.

Jón Steffensen, rejecting the fair- and dark-haired hypothesis, suggested that the terms originated from the colours on the shields of the Vikings, the finngaill carrying white shields and the dubgaill red.

Alfred Smyth gives arguments against all colour-related distinctions. Referring to Steffensen, he dismisses the assumption that "any large Scandinavian host could be composed exclusively and over a long period of dark-haired individuals" as being unrealistic. As an argument against Steffensen theory of shield-colour, as well as other theories based on colour of armour, he asserts that regular uniform and equipment were unknown in early medieval Germanic armies, and that "Norwegian pirates could afford the luxury of carrying nothing but white shields is fanciful to the extreme". As a final argument against distinction in colour between Viking factions, Smyth notes that even though these Vikings were active elsewhere, no Anglo-Saxon or Frankish chroniclers have mentioned any particular colour-distinction.

Smyth concludes that in this context, finn and dub should not be related to colour or brightness, but must be translated as "old" and "new". He finds precedent for this in part on Mageoghagan's translations of the Annals of Clonmacnoise from the early 17th century, where Sihtric (Sigtrygg) Cáech in his epitaph is called "prince of the new & old Danes".

=== Norwegians and Danes ===
The identification of Finngaill as Norwegian and Dubgaill as Danish has had a long tradition, but it was first made long after the terms fell out of contemporary use. According to Smyth, the oldest Irish source that equates the Dub- with Danes is the 12th-century Cogad Gáedel re Gallaib, who speaks of "Danish Black Gentiles" (Duibgeinti Danarda). Downham points out that the last contemporary use of the terms may be Chronicon Scotorum sub anno 941. According to Smyth, medieval Irish writers and later Gaelic antiquaries such as Dubhaltach Mac Fhirbhisigh and Geoffrey Keating "were clear on overall Norwegian origin of the Finn Gaill and the Danish origin of the Dub Gaill". Smyth also states that "it is clear from references to Scandinavian activity of the ninth and tenth century within Ireland that the 'White Foreigners' had a predominantly Norwegian origin, and that their opposite number were Danes", without giving any further references for this conclusion.

Smyth argued that Finn- and Dub- did not imply an ethnic distinction but rather "old" and "new", and also pointed out that "large viking armies were not exclusively either Danish or Norwegian". He still did not question the identification as Norwegian/Danish. Downham has pointed out that by the time the first sources equating these terms with Norwegian/Danish were written down, changes in Scandinavia had made the Irish aware of a distinction between Norwegians and Danes, a distinction the Irish (or for that matter the "Norwegians" or "Danes") would not have been aware of in the middle of the 9th century. Downham argues that a "new interpretation was interposed on the earlier terms 'Fair Foreigner' and 'Dark Foreigner'".

Downham, with reference to a suggestion made by Dumville, offers the alternative interpretation that finngaill and dubgaill identified Viking groups under different leadership. The dubgaill may identify Vikings under the leadership of the Uí Ímair, while the finngaill were those "old" Vikings present in Ireland before the middle of the 9th century. The rivalry between the Uí Ímair and other groups persisted long after the Uí Ímair had gained control over Dublin, and their hegemony over the Viking settlements in Ireland was established when Amlaíb mac Gofraid defeated the Vikings of Limerick. After the death of Ámlaib, the label finngaill fell out of contemporary use in Irish chronicles.

== Imperial style ==
The style King of the Dubgaill and Finngaill (or vice versa) was an imperial one held only by three or four dynasts of the Uí Ímair.

- Ragnall ua Ímair, the first
- Sitric Cáech, the most celebrated
- (Gofraid ua Ímair), styled simply Rí Gall (King of the Foreigners) in the surviving sources
- Amlaíb mac Gofraid, his son and the last, styled also King of Ireland in Anglo-Saxon sources

== See also ==
- Irish nobility
- *Walhaz

== References and notes ==
=== Bibliography ===
- Annals of Innisfallen, CELT: Corpus of Electronic Texts, 2000
- Annals of the Four Masters, CELT: Corpus of Electronic Texts, 2002
- Annals of Ulster AD 431–1201, CELT: Corpus of Electronic Texts, 2003
- Chronicon Scotorum, CELT: Corpus of Electronic Texts, 2003
- Byrne, Francis John (2001). Irish Kings and High-Kings (2nd ed.). Dublin: Four Courts Press. ISBN 978-1-85182-196-9.
- Downham, Clare (2007), Viking Kings of Britain and Ireland: The Dynasty of Ívarr to A.D. 1014, Edinburgh: Dunedin, ISBN 978-1-903765-89-0
- Downham, Clare (2009). "'Hiberno-Norwegians' and 'Anglo-Danes': anachronistic ethnicities and Viking-Age England" (PDF). Mediaeval Scandinavia (19): 139–169. ISSN 0076-5864.
- Dumville, David N. (2008). "Vikings in insular chronicling". In Stefan Brink and Neil Price (ed.). The Viking World. New York: Routledge. pp. 350–367. ISBN 978-0-203-41277-0.
- Murphy, Denis (1896). The Annals of Clonmacnoise, being annals of Ireland from the earliest period to A.D. 1408. Royal Society of Antiquaries of Ireland.
- Smyth, Alfred P. (1974–1977). "The Black Foreigners of York and the White Foreigners of Dublin" (PDF). Saga-Book of the Viking Society. 19: 101–117.
- Steffensen, Jón (1970–1973). "A Fragment of Viking History" (PDF). Saga-Book of the Viking Society. 18: 59–78.
- Todd, James Henthorn, ed. (1866), Cogadh Gaedhel Re Gallaibh, or The War of the Gaedhil With the Gaill, London: Longmans, Green, Reader, and Dyer (published 1867)
