= Ruaidrí mac Fáeláin =

8th Century Irish King

Ruaidrí mac Fáeláin (died 785) was a King of Leinster of the Uí Fáeláin sept of the Uí Dúnlainge branch of the Laigin. He was the son of Fáelán mac Murchado (died 738), a previous king. This sept had their royal seat at Naas in the eastern part of the Liffey plain, Airthir Liphi. He ruled from 776 to 785.

The men of Leinster had submitted to the authority of the high king Donnchad Midi (died 797) of the Clann Cholmáin in 770. In 777 a host of the Laigin was led by Donnchad into his war with the Síl nÁedo Sláine of Brega.

In 780 Donnchad campaigned against leinster again. Ruaidrí and the king of the southern Uí Cheinnselaig, Cairpre mac Laidcnén, were defeated at the Battle of Óchtar Ocha (at Kilcock, near Kildare). Donnchad pursued them with his adherents, and laid waste and burned their territory and churches. the Annals of Ulster state of this event:

"Great hosts ... pour forth for themselves streams of gore; a company parts with Life in the overthrow of Óchtar Ocha."

That same year a congress of the synods of Uí Néill and Laigin was held at Tara and peace was restored. This campaign by Donnchad may have been in support of his son-in-law Bran Ardchenn mac Muiredaig (died 795), a rival of Ruaidrí. The next year, in 781, however, border warfare with the Síl nÁedo Sláine of Brega occurred. The Battle of the Rig was fought and the king of the Uí Garrchon, Cú Chongalt, was slain.

In 782 open warfare between Ruaidrí and his rival Bran of the Uí Muiredaig sept broke out. Bran was defeated and captured at the battle of Curragh (near Kildare). Brans's allies Mugrón mac Flainn, king of Uí Fhailgi, and Dub dá Crích son of Laidcnén of the Uí Cheinnselaig were slain.

His sons included Muiredach mac Ruadrach (died 829), a king of Leinster; and Diarmait (died 832), King of Airthir Liphi and ancestor of the later Uí Fáeláin kings.
