= Cenél nGabráin =

Kin group in Scotland

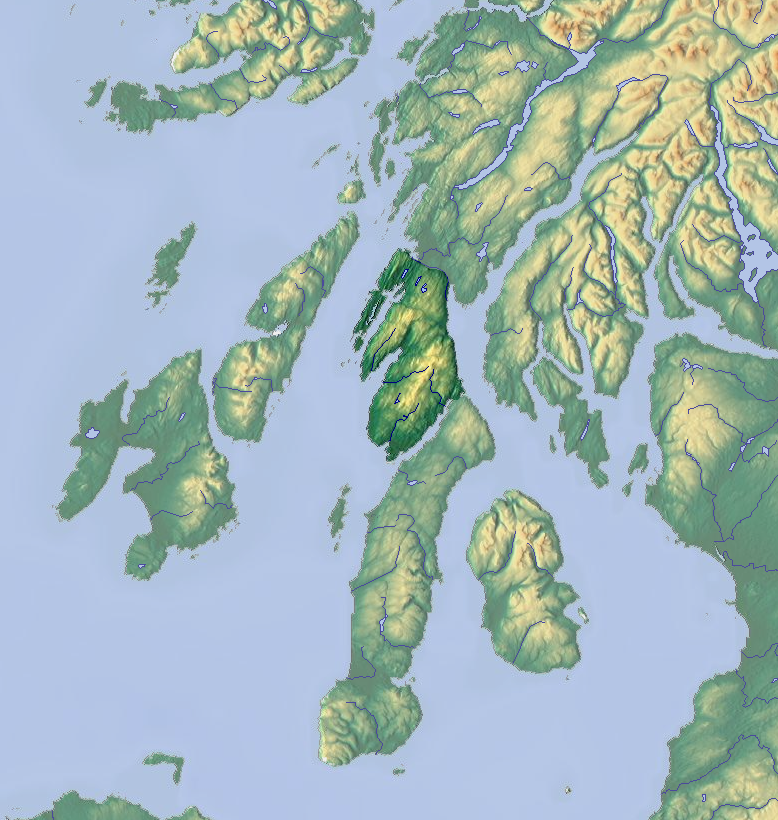
Map of modern Argyll with Knapdale at centre, Cowal and Bute to the east, Islay and Jura to the west and Lorne in the north. Kintyre and Arran lie to the south.

The Cenél nGabráin was a kin group, presumed to descend from Gabrán mac Domangairt, (Note: See Sharpe's discussion of Ioan mac Domnaill mac Gabráin, note 258 to Adomnán's Life; the presumption that the Cenél nGabráin takes its name from Gabrán mac Domangairt is no more than that.) which dominated the kingship of Dál Riata until the late 7th century and continued to provide kings thereafter. Kings of Alba and of Scotland traced their descent through Gabrán to his grandfather Fergus Mór, who was seen as the ultimate founder of the royal house as late as the 16th and 17th centuries, long after the Gaelic origins of the kingdom.

The Cenél nGabráin appears to have been centred in Kintyre and Knapdale and was one of three kindreds in early Dál Riata. Cenél Loairn was based to the north in modern Lorne while Cenél nÓengusa ruled Islay. Around 700 a fourth group, the Cenél Comgaill, split from the Cenél nGabráin and controlled Cowal and Bute.

== Early Kings of Dal Riata ==
The “Chronicle of the Kings of Dalriata’’ provides a foundation myth for the early rulers of the territory. Fergus Mór is credited as the first king who reigned for three years until his death in 501, followed by his son Domangart Réti who reigned for five years. From the mid-6th century onwards a more certain historical picture begins to emerge. Domangart was then followed by his son Comgall who reigned for 33 years and who was succeeded by his brother Gabrán mac Domangairt. About 558 Conall mac Comgaill, Gabrán’s nephew, became king.

Áedán mac Gabráin, son of Gabrán mac Domangairt and king of Dál Riata from c. 576 until c. 609, is the earliest king in Scotland about whom it is possible to create a "frail narrative". Seemingly, every subsequent king of Cenél nGabráin was descended from him and every Scottish king from c.1000 onwards claimed him as an ancestor. The Irish annals record Áedán's campaigns against his neighbours in Ireland and northern Britain, including expeditions to Orkney and perhaps the Isle of Man.

== Áedán’s successors ==
The period following the death of Domangart Réti suggests “an alternating pattern of successions” between the two main Dalriadan lineages stemming from his sons Comgall and Gabrán. The available sources are contradictory as to Áedán’s successors. Irish chronicles state that on his death he was succeeded by Connad Cerr the son of Conall mac Comgaill, which is consistent with this pattern. However the Dalriadan chronicle makes Áedán’s son Eochaid Buide the next king with Connad only reigning for a few months after Eochaid's death. It is possible that Eochaid did succeed his father, but was overthrown by Connad at a later date. Alternatively, they may have divided Dál Riata between themselves with Eochaid becoming king of Kintyre in 609, and Connad becoming king of Cowal. Another possibility is that the Dalriadan king list chose to ignore Connad’s reign over the whole territory as the Cenél nGabráin were in the ascendancy at the time it was written.

However long Connad’s reign over Dál Riata was it came to a brutal end in battle in 631. The location of Fid Euin is unknown, although it may have been in Ulaid territory. Wherever it was the evidence is clear that the encounter was a disaster for his forces, with Eochaid’s son Fáelbe and his cousin Rigullón (son of Conaing mac Aedan) also dying there at the hands of Congal Cáech’s army. Connad was succeeded by his son Ferchar who reigned for sixteen years and then the alternating pattern re-emerged when the next king was Domnall Brecc, son of Eochaid from the Cenél nGabráin line. By this time (the 640s) the Cenél Comgaill had clearly emerged as a lineage in its own right. (Note: Fraser has Ferchar's assumption of the Dalriadan kingship taking place after, rather than before, Domnall Brecc, possibly after the battle of Magh Rath.)

Unlike the Cenél Loairn, the Senchus Fer n-Alban does not list any kindreds within the Cenél nGabráin. However, probable descendants of Gabrán, such as Dúnchad mac Conaing and his many kinsmen, would appear to have disputed the succession with the descendants of Eochaid Buide, so that this absence of explicit segments in the kindred may be misleading. (Note: Sharpe, "The thriving of Dalriada", argues for the unimportance of such segments.) A genealogy of David I of Scotland in the late-14th century Book of Ballymote notes the following divisions:

- After Áedán mac Gabráin, between the main line, called "the sons of Eochaid Buide" and "the children of Cináed mac Ailpín", and the "sons of Conaing".
- After Eochaid Buide, between the main line and the "children of Fergus Goll" and the "children of Connad Cerr ... or the men of Fife", although modern studies make Connad Cerr a member of the Cenél Comgaill.
- After Eochaid mac Domangairt, between the main line and the Cenél Comgaill.

The line of Dál Riata succession after the defeat of Domnall Brecc at the battle of Magh Rath in 639 is not certain. Domnall's cousin Dúnchad mac Conaing may have been joint ruler with Domnall's brother Conall Crandomna until the former was killed at the Battle of Strathyre in 654. Other nGabráin dynasts then followed until Ferchar Fota of Cenél Loairn took the throne towards the end of the 7th century. During the 8th century the kingship once again alternated but between these two kin groups to the exclusion of Cenél Comgaill.

The Annals of Tigernach record a sea battle against the Cenél Loairn at “Ardde-anesbi” in October 719. Cenél nGabráin were led by Dúnchad Bec the king of Kintyre, who bested Selbach mac Ferchair of Loairn. This is the earliest reference to the “tribe of Gabran” in the surviving annals. However by 741 Argyll had been “decisively annexed” by Onuist the powerful Pictish king. This coincided with a period of domination by Cenél Loairn in Argyll and it is possible that Onuist saw this as a more of a threat than the over-kingship of Dál Riata residing in Kintyre. Some years later Áed Find took the kingship, restoring Cenél nGabráin to supremacy and pushing back against the Picts in battle in 768.

== Important sites and territories ==
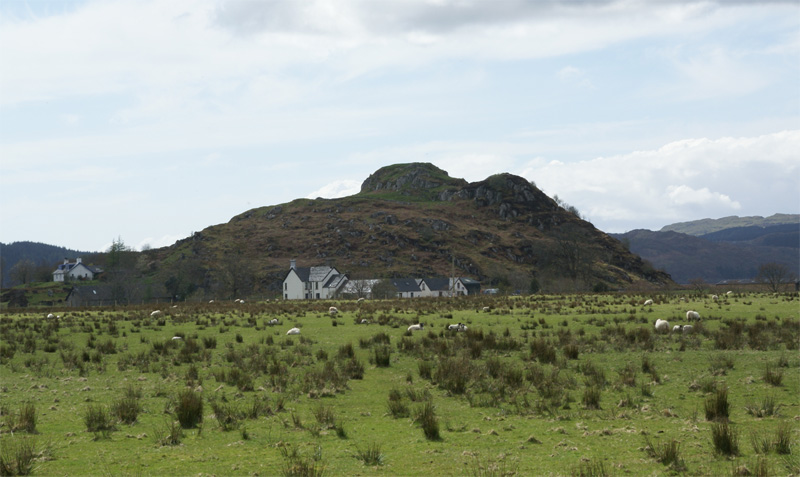
The crag of Dunadd, the site of a royal fort of Dál Riata

The domain of the Cenél nGabráin may have included Arran, Jura and Gigha. The title king of Kintyre is used of a number of presumed kings of the Cenél nGabráin. Two probable royal sites are known, Dunadd, which lies at the northern edge of their presumed lands, and Aberte (or Dún Aberte), which is very likely the later Dunaverty on the headland beside Southend, Kintyre. The remains of numerous other duns have been found throughout the area as have crannog sites. The listing of hundreds of "houses" by the Senchus indicates that a substantial number of other dwellings existed as well.

Kilmartin may have been an important early Christian site by reason of its proximity to Dunadd and its dedication to Saint Martin of Tours, as may Kilmichael Glassary. However, there appears to be no religious site of the importance of Lismore in the lands of the rival Cenél Loairn. Cenél nGabráin did however maintain strong links with Iona.

== Commerce, agriculture and armed forces ==
Excavations at Dunadd have provided important information about the kin group’s lives. Rotary querns were used to grind barley and oats and there is evidence of the consumption of cattle, sheep and pigs. The remains of pottery drinking vessels indicate they were imported from France and glassware found there may have had the same origin. Imported seeds such as coriander and dill were found along with a fragment of the yellow Mediterranean pigment orpiment. It is not clear how such a trade network of this nature developed as early as the late sixth and seventh centuries but it is likely that the Christian church had a crucial role. There is also evidence of iron and leather-working, of tin imported from Cornwall and of moulds used to create ornate brooches. Some of the bird head brooch designs indicate a distinct Dunadd style based on a fusion of Anglo-Saxon and Irish fashions.

The Senchus, which is the oldest known census in Britain, indicates that for every twenty "houses" the cenela were required to provide a crew for two seven-bench fighting ships, suggesting that Dál Riata as a whole had a military force that was about 2,000 strong in the 10th century. A large hoard of weaponry was found at Dunadd including fragments of a sword, spearheads and crossbow bolts.

== In literature ==
In 672 the Annals of Ulster refer to the capture of Conamail, the son of Cano. Cano is seemingly the son of Gartnait, and a grandson of Áedán mac Gabráin and his story is recounted in the 9th century tale, the Scéla Cano meic Gartnáin. His kindred, Cenél nGartnait, is mentioned in the Iona chronicles with a date of the late 660s. However the connection to Aedan is contradicted elsewhere in the records where his father is referred to as Accidan and Gartnait is more likely a contemporary of Áedán's grandsons than his son. This literary connection with Cenél nGabráin is thus speculative.

== Viking era & legacy ==
With the arrival of Norse raiders on the western seaboard of Scotland towards the end of the 8th century the power of Cenél nGabráin fell into decline. The king of Fortriu, Eógan mac Óengusa, and the king of Dál Riata, Áed mac Boanta, were among the dead after a major defeat by the Vikings in 839. At some point in the 9th century, the beleaguered kingdom of Dál Riata lost the Hebrides to the Vikings, when Ketil Flatnose is said to have founded the Kingdom of the Isles. (Note: Hunter (2000) states that Ketil was "in charge of an extensive island realm and, as a result, sufficiently prestigious to contemplate the making of agreements and alliances with other princelings", but stops short of describing him as a monarch.)

The names of two of the Dalriadan kindreds – Comgaill and Loairn – are preserved in the modern Argyll place names of Cowal and Lorne, but the presence of the cenéla nGabráin and nÓengusa in that part of the world has vanished from the toponymic record. It is however possible that as these peoples were driven out, first from the islands and then latterly from parts of the mainland, they retreated east. The modern names of Angus and Gowrie in eastern Scotland may reflect the movement of those refugees from the west. (Note: Watson suggests that if Gabrán's wife was the "daughter of a Brachan of Forfarshire" he may have ruled the adjacent Gowrie prior to moving to Dál Riata.)

Kingships of Dál Riata are recorded after this time but none are considered to be Cenél nGabráin dynasts. Nonetheless, there was a merger of the Dál Riatan and Pictish crowns under Cínaed mac Ailpín (Kenneth MacAlpin) in the 840s and the House of Alpin became the leaders of a combined Gaelic-Pictish kingdom. The immediate descendants of Cináed were styled either as King of the Picts or King of Fortriu. When Cínaed's eventual successor Donald II died at Dunnottar in 900, he was the first man to be recorded as rí Alban (i.e. King of Scotland). At about this time a family tree was created for Donald that made Áed Find his ancestor. Whatever the accuracy of this genealogy it was clearly important to the Scots royal house to be able to trace their ancestry back to the Cenél nGabráin and its Irish roots.

== See also ==
- Origins of the Kingdom of Alba
- List of kings of Dál Riata
- List of monarchs of Scotland
