= Domangairt =

Domangart or Domangairt is a given name. Notable people with the name include:

- Comgall mac Domangairt, king of Dál Riata in the early 6th century
- Domangart mac Domnaill (died 673) king in Dál Riata (modern western Scotland) and the son of Domnall Brecc
- Domangart Réti, king of Dál Riata in the early 6th century, following the death of his father, Fergus Mór
- Eochaid mac Domangairt (died ca. 697), king of Dál Riata (modern western Scotland) in about 697
- Gabrán mac Domangairt, king of Dál Riata in the middle of the 6th century
