= Dúnchad Bec =

8th-century Kintyre king

Dúnchad Bec was king of Kintyre (in Dál Riata) in the early 8th century.

Dúnchad Bec is too late to have been included in the Senchus Fer n-Alban, which includes kings to the first half of the 7th century. He is also unknown to later genealogies. He is named from two entries in the Annals of Ulster (and the Annals of Tigernach). The first entry, for the year 719, reports a battle at Ard Nesbi between Dúnchad Bec "with the Cenél nGabráin" and Selbach mac Ferchair with the Cenél Loairn. The second, for 721, reports the death of "Dúnchad Bec, king of Cenn Tíre".

As king of Kintyre and chief of the Cenél nGabráin, Dúnchad Bec was likely a descendant of Gabrán mac Domangairt. If the assumption that Fiannamail ua Dúnchado was a grandson of the earlier king Dúnchad mac Conaing is correct, then it may be that Dúnchad Bec belonged to this segment of the Cenél nGabráin, probably descended from Conaing son of Áedán, which appears to have contested with the main line, descended from Eochaid Buide.

It is not known who succeeded Dúnchad Bec as king of the Cenél nGabráin. The next known king is Eochaid mac Echdach, of the line of Eochaid Buide, whose supporters deposed Dúngal mac Selbaig in 726.
