= Tarbert Castle =

Castle in Argyll, Scotland

- Tarbert, Kintyre, Scotland
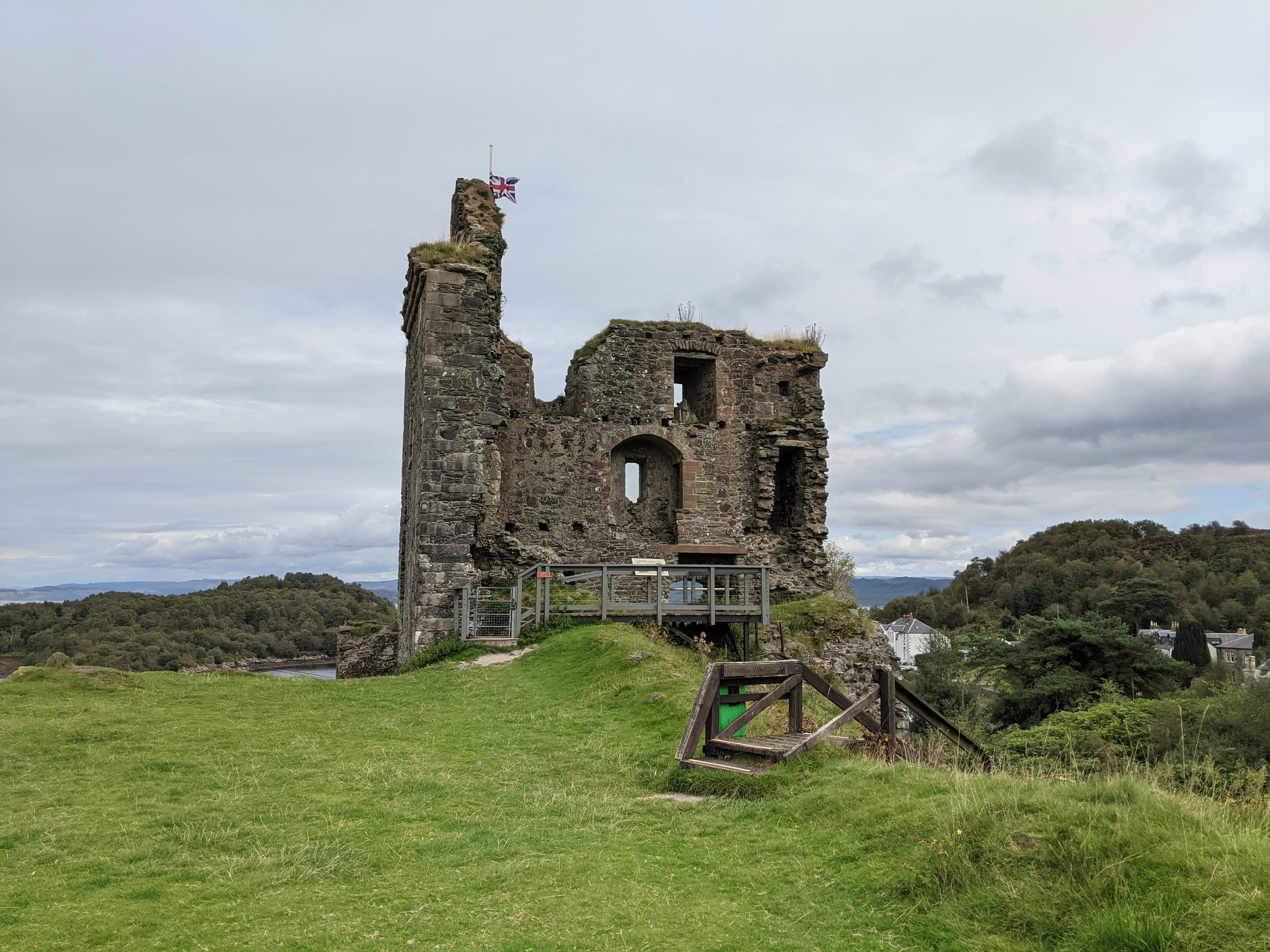
- Tarbert Castle

Site information
- Open to the public: Yes
- Condition: Ruin

Location
- Location within Argyll and Bute
- Coordinates: 55.863611°N 5.408611°W

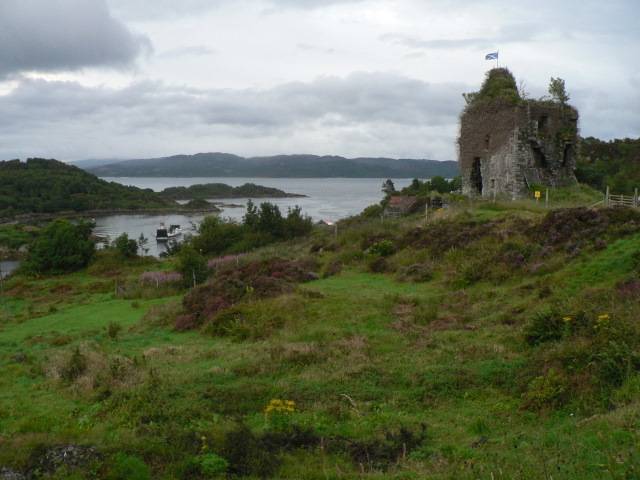
Tarbert Castle in 2008 before restoration works

Tarbert Castle is located on the southern shore of East Loch Tarbert, at Tarbert, Argyll, Scotland, at the north end of Kintyre. Tarbert Castle was a strategic royal stronghold during the Middle Ages and one of three castles at Tarbert. The castle overlooks the harbour and although pre 14th century in construction, the tower dates back to 1494 and the visit of James IV to the Western Highlands.

== History ==
In 712, Tarbert was burned by King Selbach mac Ferchair of Cenél Loairn and of Dál Riata and in 731 by his son, Dúngal mac Selbaig.

King Edward I of England handed control of the castle to the Scottish King John II de Balliol in 1292. A fortified structure was built in Tarbert during the 13th century. It was reinforced with the addition of an outer bailey and towers in the 1320s by Robert the Bruce. A tower house was added in the 16th century, which is the most noticeable part of the remains. The castle occupies high land above the village, providing views up Loch Fyne and beyond to the Firth of Clyde. This castle was captured from John MacDonald of Islay, Lord of the Isles by James IV of Scotland as part of his campaign to destroy the power of the Lords of the Isles in 1494. In 1687, the castle was involved in another skirmish when Walter Campbell of Skipness Castle seized it as a stronghold for Archibald Campbell, 9th Earl of Argyll as part of actions in support of the Monmouth Rebellion in England.

There are only a couple of standing walls left. The castle has a commanding view of the water approaches.

Now owned by the community and part of a volunteer-maintained heritage park.

== Constables of Tarbert Castle ==
- John de Lany 1326
- Charles MacAlister 1481

== Bibliography ==
- David Hicks (1982), The Highland Clans, ISBN 978-0-09-144740-3
- Annals of Ulster, AD 431-1201 (vols. 1 and 2) edition and translation
