= Máel Dúin mac Conaill =

Máel Dúin mac Conaill (died 688) was a king in Dál Riata (modern western Scotland).

He was the son of Conall Crandomna. His death is reported by the Annals of Ulster, but without mention of a title. He is among the kings named by the Duan Albanach, following his brother Domnall Donn, which assigns him an improbable reign of 17 years.

The general confusion of the sources makes any conclusion difficult, but while it is likely that Máel Dúin was co-ruler, with his brother Domnall Donn, of the Cenél nGabráin lands in Kintyre, it is not likely that Máel Dúin and Domnall were high kings of Dál Riata. Whether the lands of the Cenél nGabráin were subject to Ecgfrith of Northumbria, or whether they were dominated by Ferchar Fota of the Cenél Loairn, cannot be said with certainty.

The next king of the Cenél nGabráin known is Eochaid mac Domangairt.

| Preceded by ?Domangart mac Domnaill | ?King of Dál Riata or king of the Cenél nGabráin ?-688 | Succeeded by ?Domnall Donn |
