= Domangart mac Domnaill =

King in Dál Riata (d. 673 AD)

Domangart mac Domnaill (died 673) was a king in Dál Riata (consisting of part of modern western Scotland) and the son of Domnall Brecc. It is not clear whether he was over-king of Dál Riata or king of the Cenél nGabráin.

Domangart is not listed by the Duan Albanach but is included in other sources, such as genealogies of William the Lion, and that of Causantín mac Cuilén found with the Senchus fer n-Alban. In these genealogies he is noted as the father of Eochaid mac Domangairt.

The Annals of Ulster for 673 report: "The killing of Domangart, son of Domnall Brecc, the king of Dál Riata." Some king-lists state that in his time the Cenél Comgaill separated from the Cenél nGabráin.

It is not clear who succeeded Domangart as king of Dál Riata, if he was such, or as king of the Cenél nGabráin. Known kings after Domangart include Máel Dúin mac Conaill and Domnall Donn of the Cenél nGabráin and Ferchar Fota of the Cenél Loairn is assigned a long reign of 21 years by the Duan Albanach and other king-lists, and this would place the beginning of his rule close to the death of Domangart.

Preceded by Conall Crandomna	King of Dál Riata c. 660–673	Succeeded by ? Máel Dúin mac Conaill or Domnall Donn or Ferchar Fota
