= Mac Domangairt =

Origin
- Region of origin: Scottish

Mac Domangairt is a Scottish surname. Notable people with the surname include:

- Comgall mac Domangairt (6th century), king of Dál Riata
- Eochaid mac Domangairt (died ca. 697), king of Dál Riata (modern western Scotland)
- Gabrán mac Domangairt (6th century), king of Dál Riata
