= Domnall of Dalriada =

Two kings of Dál Riata were named Domnall (Donald):

- Domnall Brecc (Donald the Freckled) (died 642)
- Domnall Donn (Donald the Brown) (died c. 685)
