= Domnall Donn =

King of Dal Riata

Domnall Donn 'the Brown' (died 696) was king of Dál Riata (modern western Scotland). He was a son of Conall Crandomna.

His death is reported by the Annals of Ulster, but without mention of a title. He is among the kings named by the Duan Albanach, following his father and Dúnchad mac Conaing, which assigns him an improbable reign of 13 years. He may have been co-ruler with his brother Máel Dúin mac Conaill, or have reigned for 3 years rather than 13, making his rule 693–696 approximately.

If he was king of Dál Riata, rather than only of the Cenél nGabráin of Kintyre, he was followed by Ferchar Fota of the Cenél Loairn. The next king of the Cenél nGabráin known is Eochaid mac Domangairt.

Preceded by ?Domangart mac Domnaill or Máel Dúin mac Conaill	?King of Dál Riata (or king of the Cenél nGabráin ? with Máel Dúin mac Conaill) ?693–696	Succeeded by ?Ferchar Fota or Eochaid mac Domangairt
