= Mac Nisse =

Mac Nisse, an early Irish matronymic meaning "son of Ness", may refer to:

- Mac Nisse of Connor, founding saint of Connor, Co. Antrim (d. 514)
- Mac Nisse, third abbot of Clonmacnoise (d. 580s)
- Fergus Mór, a legendary king of the Díal Riata (5th century)
- Domangart Réti, Fergus's son and successor (early 6th century)
