= List of kings of Dál Riata =

This is a list of the kings of Dál Riata, a Gaelic kingdom spanning Ireland and Scotland.

== Background ==
It is not until the middle of the 6th century that Irish annals plausibly report the deaths of kings of Dál Riata, with the death of Comgall mac Domangairt, c. 538–545, and of his brother Gabrán, c. 558–560. After the disastrous Battle of Moira (Mag Rath) in 637, Irish Dál Riata lost possession of its Scottish lands. During the 8th century, the rival Dál nAraidi had overrun Irish Dál Riata, though the area retained its name well into the 14th century.

The last attested king of Scottish Dál Riata is Fergus mac Echdach, brother of and successor to Áed Find, whose death is reported in the Annals of Ulster in 781. Dál Riata was divided into a number of kingroups or dynasties, called cenéla, among which was the Cenél nGabráin of Kintyre, who claimed descent from Gabrán mac Domangairt, and the Cenél Loairn, who claimed descent from Loarn mac Eirc. While the Irish origin of the Kings of Dál Riata is unquestionable, the links to the Irish nobility were likely exaggerated in later centuries to claim foundership of the kingdom in an effort to add legitimacy to the dynasties.

== Kings of Dál Riata ==
=== Kings before the Battle of Mag Rath ===
Reign	Ruler	Name	Family	Remarks
439-474	Erc of Dál Riata	Erc mac Eochaid	Son of Eochaid Muinremuir
474-498	Loarn mac Eirc	Loarn mac Eirc	Son of Erc	Eponymous founder of the Cenél Loairn; claimed ancestry probably spurious
498-501	Fergus Mór	Fergus Mór mac Eirc; Mac Nisse Mór	Son of Erc	Mac Nisse Mór is more likely the real figure who was replaced by Fergus Mor; Annals of Tigernach report his death c. 501. Buchanan calls him Fergus II and gives him a reign of 404-420.
501-507	Domangart Réti	Domangart Réti; Domangart mac Ferguso; Domangart Mac Nissi	Son of Fergus Mór	The Annals of Innisfallen report the death of Domangart of Cenn Tíre c. 507; the patronymic Mac Nissi is probably a textual error. Buchanan calls him Dongardus and gives him a reign of 452-457.
507-542	Comgall	Comgall mac Domangairt	Son of Domangart	Said to have reigned 35 years; multiple obits in the Annals of Ulster; eponymous ancestor of the Cenél Comgaill. Buchanan calls him Congallus I and gives him a reign of 479-501.
542-560	Gabrán	Gabrán mac Domangairt	Son of Domangart	His death may be associated with Bridei son of Maelchon; duplicate obits in the Annals of Ulster; eponymous ancestor of the Cenél nGabráin. Buchanan calls him Goranus and gives him a reign of 501-535.
Died c. 574	Conall	Conall mac Comgaill	Cenél Comgaill; son of Comgall	Said to have given Iona to Saint Columba; the first king to have an entry in the Annals of Ulster other than an obit. Buchanan calls him Congallus II and gives him a reign of 558-574.
Died c. 606	Áedán	Áedán mac Gabráin	Cenél nGabráin; son of Gabrán	Known from Adomnán of Iona's Life of Saint Columba and from many entries in the Annals. Buchanan calls him Aidanus and gives him a reign of 575-605.
Died c. 629 (after Connad Cerr)	Eochaid Buide	Eochaid Buide; Eochaid mac Áedáin	Cenél nGabráin; son of Áedán	Known from Adomnán of Iona's Life of Saint Columba. Buchanan calls him Eugenius IV and gives him a reign of 606-626.
Died c. 629 (before Eochaid Buide)	Connad Cerr	Connad mac Conaill	Cenél Comgaill; son of Conall	Co-ruler with Eochaid Buide whom he predeceased; defeated and killed in battle at Fid Eóin by Congal Cáech, king of the Ulaid. Buchanan calls him Kenneth I and gives him a reign of 605-606.
Died c. 642	Domnall Brecc	Domnall Brecc; Domnall mac Echdach	Cenél nGabráin; son of Eochaid Buide	Defeated and killed in battle at Strathcarron by Eugein map Beli, king of Alt Clut. Buchanan calls him Donald IV and gives him a reign of 638-652.
Unknown	Ferchar	Ferchar mac Connaid	Cenél Comgaill; son of Connad Cerr	His obit in the Annals of Ulster for 694 appears misplaced; according to the Duan Albanach he was king after his father, presumably jointly with Domnall Brecc. He is misplaced by Buchanan and given a reign of 626-638.

=== Kings from Mag Rath to 741 ===
Reign	Ruler	Name	Family	Remarks
Died c. 654	Dúnchad	Dúnchad mac Conaing; Dúnchad mac Dúbain	Cenél nGabráin; probably son of Conaing son of Áedán	Presumed descendants of Dúnchad appear frequently in the Annals
Died c. 660	Conall Crandomna	Conall Crandomna; Conall Crannamna; Conall mac Echdach	Cenél nGabráin; son of Eochaid Buide
Died c. 673	Domangart	Domangart mac Domnaill	Cenél nGabráin; son of Domnall Brecc
Died c. 689	Máel Dúin	Máel Dúin mac Conaill	Cenél nGabráin; son of Conall
Died c. 696	Domnall Donn	Domnall Donn; Domnall mac Conaill	Cenél nGabráin; son of Conall
Died c. 697	Ferchar Fota	Ferchar the Tall; Ferchar mac Feredaig	Cenél Loairn; a descendant in the seventh generation of Loarn	Chief of the Cenél Loairn and, for a short time, king of Dál Riata. Buchanan calls him Ferchardus II and gives him a reign of 652-670.
Unknown	Eochaid	Eochaid mac Domangairt	Cenél nGabráin; son of Domangart	Unattested by the Annals and omitted from later genealogies but included in the Duan Albanach. Buchanan calls him Eugenius VI and gives him a reign of 694-704.
Deposed c. 698	Ainbcellach	Ainbcellach mac Ferchair	Cenél Loairn; son of Ferchar Fota	Died 718 in battle against Selbach his brother. Buchanan gives him a reign of 704-706.
Died 700	Fiannamail	Fiannamail ua Dúnchado; Fiannamail mac h-ua Dúnchado	Cenél nGabráin ?; perhaps a grandson or great-grandson of the earlier Dúnchad son of Conaing	It is uncertain whether Fiannamail should be counted as a king of Dál Riata, or of Dál nAraidi; his possible sons Indrechtach and Conall died in battle in 741.
Died 707	Béc	Béc ua Dúnchado	Cenél nGabráin ?; probably a grandson or nephew of the earlier Dúnchad son of Conaing	Apparently chief of the Cenél nGabráin
Died 721	Dúnchad	Dúnchad Bec	Cenél nGabráin; unknown but a relationship with Fiannamail, Béc and the earlier Dúnchad mac Conaing is possible	chief of Kintyre, which is to say the Cenél nGabráin, from before 719 to 721
Abdicated 723	Selbach	Selbach mac Ferchair	Cenél Loairn; son of Ferchar Fota	Abdicated in favour of his son Dúngal and entered religion, died 730
Deposed as king of Dál Riata 726	Dúngal	Dúngal mac Selbaig	Cenél Loairn; son of Selbach	Probably remained chief of the Cenél Loairn until deposed in 733
726–731	Eochaid	Eochaid Angbad; Eochaid mac Echdach	Cenel nGabráin; son of Eochaid	A return to the Cenel nGabráin line. He take clerical status in 731 and dies in 733. Buchanan calls him Eugenius VII and gives him a reign of 706-723.
731–733	Alpín	Alpín mac Echdach	Cenel nGabráin; son of Eochaid	Appears in the Duan Albanach and the Synchronisms of Flann Mainstreach.
733–736	Muiredach	Muiredach mac Ainbcellaig	Cenél Loairn; son of Ainbcellach	Chief of the Cenél Loairn; Muiredach may have been the king of Dál Riata as well. Buchanan calls him Mordacus and gives him a reign of 723-730
Unknown	Eógan	Eógan mac Muiredaig	Cenél Loairn; son of Muiredach	Known from some Scots chronicles; not named as king by the Duan Albanach; may have been chief of the Cenél Loairn. Buchanan calls him Eugenius VIII and since he is misplaced, he gives him a late reign of 761-764.
Died 741	Indrechtach	Indrechtach mac Fiannamail	Cenel nGabráin ?; presumably son of the earlier Fiannamail	Identification uncertain, killed at the battle of Forboros, perhaps by the Picts of Óengus mac Fergusa; this may, however, have been a king of Dál nAraidi, but in this case his patronymic should be mac Lethlobair

=== Kings from the 740s onwards ===
Reign	Ruler	Name	Family	Remarks
c. 728-741	Eogan	Eogan mac Ferchair Fota	Cenel Loairn; son of Ferchair Fota mac Feredaig	Included in the Scottish Latin Chronicles. Welsh sources record the death of Owen, King of the Picts, in either 736 or 741.
c. 741-744	Muireadhach	Muireadhach mac Ainbcellaigh	Cenel Loairn; son of Eogan mac Ferchair Fota	Included in the Scottish Latin Chronicles.
c. 744-747	Eogan	Eogan mac Muireadhaigh	Cenel Loairn; son of Muireadhach mac Ainbcellaig	Included in the Scottish Latin Chronicles.
c. 747-778	Áed Find	Áed mac Echdach	Cenel nGabráin; presumably a son of Eochaid son of Eochaid	Later genealogies make Áed Find the son of Domangart son of Domnall Brecc which is chronologically improbable, others have one Eochaid rather than the expected two. Buchanan calls him Etfinus and gives him a reign of 730-761.
c. 778–781	Fergus	Fergus mac Echdach	Cenel nGabráin; brother of Áed Find.
c. 781-804	Selbach	Selbach mac Eogain	Cenel Loairn; son of Eogain mac Muireadhaigh	Included in the Scottish Latin Chronicles.
c. 804-834	Eochaid	Eochaid mac Áeda Find	Cenel nGabráin; son of Áed Find	Included in the Scottish Latin Chronicles, confirmed by the Synchronisms of Flann and known from later genealogies. Buchanan calls him Achaius and gives him a late reign of 788-819
c. 834-841	Dungal	Dungal mac Selbaig	Cenel Loairn; son of Selbach mac Eogain	Included in the Scottish Latin Chronicles. Prof. Hudons believes him to be the father of Girc mac Dúngail (878–889)
Died 792	Donncoirce	None known	Unknown	Obit in the Annals of Ulster; not included in the Duan Albanach or later genealogies
Unknown	Caustantín	Caustantín mac Fergusa	House of Fortriu, given Prof. Broun proposal that he is descendant of the first Óengus mac Fergusa	King of the Picts 789–820; included in the Duan Albanach but not generally supposed to have been a king in Dál Riata
c. 805–807	Conall	Conall mac Taidg	Unknown	Death reported in battle in Kintyre, presumed to be the first of the Conalls included in the Duan Albanach; reign approximate
c. 807–811	Conall	Conall mac Adaein	Unknown	Killed Conall mac Taidg, "another Conall" reigned four years according to the Duan Albanach; reign approximate
c. 811–835	Domnall	Domnall mac Caustantín	House of Fortriu, son of Caustantín mac Fergusa	A king named Domnall reigned twenty-four years according to the Duan Albanach; reign approximate
Unknown	Óengus	Óengus mac Fergusa	House of Fortriu, brother of Caustantín	King of the Picts 820–834; included in the Duan Albanach but not generally supposed to have been a king in Dál Riata
Unknown	Eóganán	Eóganán mac Óengusa	House of Fortriu, Son of Óengus	King of the Picts 837–839; included in the Duan Albanach but not generally supposed to have been a king in Dál Riata
c. 835–839	Áed	Áed mac Boanta	House of Fortriu	Killed in battle against Vikings alongside Eóganán mac Óengusa; a king Áed is named by the Duan Albanach
c. 841-843	Alpín	Alpín mac Echdach	Cenel nGabráin; son of Eochaid son of Áed Find	Included in the Scottish Latin Chronicles, confirmed by the Synchronisms of Flann. He is also known from later genealogies.
c. -845	Eóganán	Eóganán mac Óengusa	Unknown	He appears as the second Eóganán in the Synchronisms of Flann. In Cogad Gáedel re Gallaib, he is called the King of the Dál Riata, son of Oengus, it reports that he was killed in battle against the Vikings near Dublin in 845.
c. 843–858	Cináed	Cináed mac Ailpín	Cenel nGabráin; son of Alpín mac Echdach	King of the Picts c. 843–858; not generally supposed that he was a king in Dál Riata
c. 914	Diarmaid	Diarmaid mac Sealbhaigh	None known	King of the Dál Riata; generally supposed that he was a king of Irish Dál Riata

== Sources ==
The main sources for the kings of Dál Riata include:

- The Annals of Ulster
- The Annals of Tigernach
- The Senchus Fer n-Alban
- The Synchronisms of Flann Mainistrech of Monasterboice
- The Duan Albanach
- Adomnán of Iona's Life of Saint Columba
- A variety of genealogies for later kings of Alba

Less reliable sources may include:

- The Annals of Innisfallen
- The Chronicon Scotorum
- The Annals of the Four Masters
- The Annals of Clonmacnoise

Interpretation of these sources remains problematic. Many entries which appear to refer to Dál Riata lack context, many persons named lack patronyms or other identifying bynames. There are many disagreements among sources. Some entries have been amended and expanded at a later time.

== See also ==
- Kings of the Picts
- Kings of Strathclyde
- Kings of Scots
