= Dúnchad mac Conaing =

7th-century king of Dál Riata

Dúnchad mac Conaing (or Dúnchad mac Dubáin) (died 654) was king of Dál Riata (modern western Scotland). He was joint ruler with Conall Crandomna until he was defeated and killed by Talorgan son of Eanfrith, king of the Picts, in the Battle of Strathyre. Sources differ on Dúnchad's patronym and thus his presumed ancestry.

The death of Dúnchad mac Conaing in battle is reported in the Annals of Tigernach in 654: "... there fell Dúnchad, son of Conaing, and Congal, son of Ronan". John Bannerman proposed that this Dúnchad was the same person as the Dúnchad or Dúngal who is found as joint ruler with Conall Crandomna. Dúnchad mac Conaing appears in the Senchus fer n-Alban: "These are the sons of Conaing, son of Áedán .i. Rigallán, Ferchar, Artán, Artúr, Dondchad, Domungart, Nechtan, Ném, Crumíne.

However, the Synchronisms of Flann Mainistrech list Dúnchad mac Dubáin as king, while the Duan Albanach associated one Dúngal with Conall. Dubán may be a hypocoristic form of Dub, and represent a byname ("little Black"). An alternative reconstruction made Dúnchad a descendant of Áedán mac Gabráin's passed-over brother Eoganán.

He is presumed to have had at least one son, Conall Cáel (died 681), and it is possible that he was the grandfather, or great-grandfather by some readings, of Fiannamail ua Dúnchado and an ancestor of Dúnchad Bec.

== Notes ==
Regnal titles
Preceded by Ferchar mac Connaid	King of Dál Riata; 650–654; With: Conall Crandomna	Succeeded by Conall Crandomna
