= Ferchar mac Connaid =

7th-century king of Dál Riata

Ferchar mac Connaid was king of Dál Riata (in modern Scotland) from about 642 until 650.

He was a son of Connad Cerr and thus probably a member of the Cenél Comgaill, although some older reconstructions make him a member of the Cenél nGabráin. His death appears in the Annals of Ulster for 694 along with a number of other entries which appear to be misplaced by 45 years. The Duan Albanach grants him a reign of 16 years, which may mean that he ruled jointly with Domnall Brecc before becoming sole king, but the reign lengths of the Duan are problematic and this may be an error.

Ferchar is the only descendant of Connad Cerr known to have held the kingship of Dál Riata. The genealogies in the Senchus fer n-Alban do not include Ferchar and his kin.

Preceded by Domnall Brecc	King of Dál Riata; 642–650	Succeeded by Dúnchad mac Conaing and Conall Crandomna
