= 660 =

660 in various calendars
- Gregorian calendar: 660; DCLX
- Ab urbe condita: 1413
- Armenian calendar: 109; ԹՎ ՃԹ
- Assyrian calendar: 5410
- Balinese saka calendar: 581–582
- Bengali calendar: 66–67
- Berber calendar: 1610
- Buddhist calendar: 1204
- Burmese calendar: 22
- Byzantine calendar: 6168–6169
- Chinese calendar: 己未年 (Earth Goat); 3357 or 3150 — to — 庚申年 (Metal Monkey); 3358 or 3151
- Coptic calendar: 376–377
- Discordian calendar: 1826
- Ethiopian calendar: 652–653
- Hebrew calendar: 4420–4421
- Hindu calendars
- Vikram Samvat: 716–717
- Shaka Samvat: 581–582
- Kali Yuga: 3760–3761
- Holocene calendar: 10660
- Iranian calendar: 38–39
- Islamic calendar: 39–40
- Japanese calendar: Hakuchi 11 (白雉１１年)
- Javanese calendar: 551–552
- Julian calendar: 660; DCLX
- Korean calendar: 2993
- Minguo calendar: 1252 before ROC 民前1252年
- Nanakshahi calendar: −808
- Seleucid era: 971/972 AG
- Thai solar calendar: 1202–1203
- Tibetan calendar: ས་མོ་ལུག་ལོ་ (female Earth-Sheep); 786 or 405 or −367 — to — ལྕགས་ཕོ་སྤྲེ་ལོ་ (male Iron-Monkey); 787 or 406 or −366

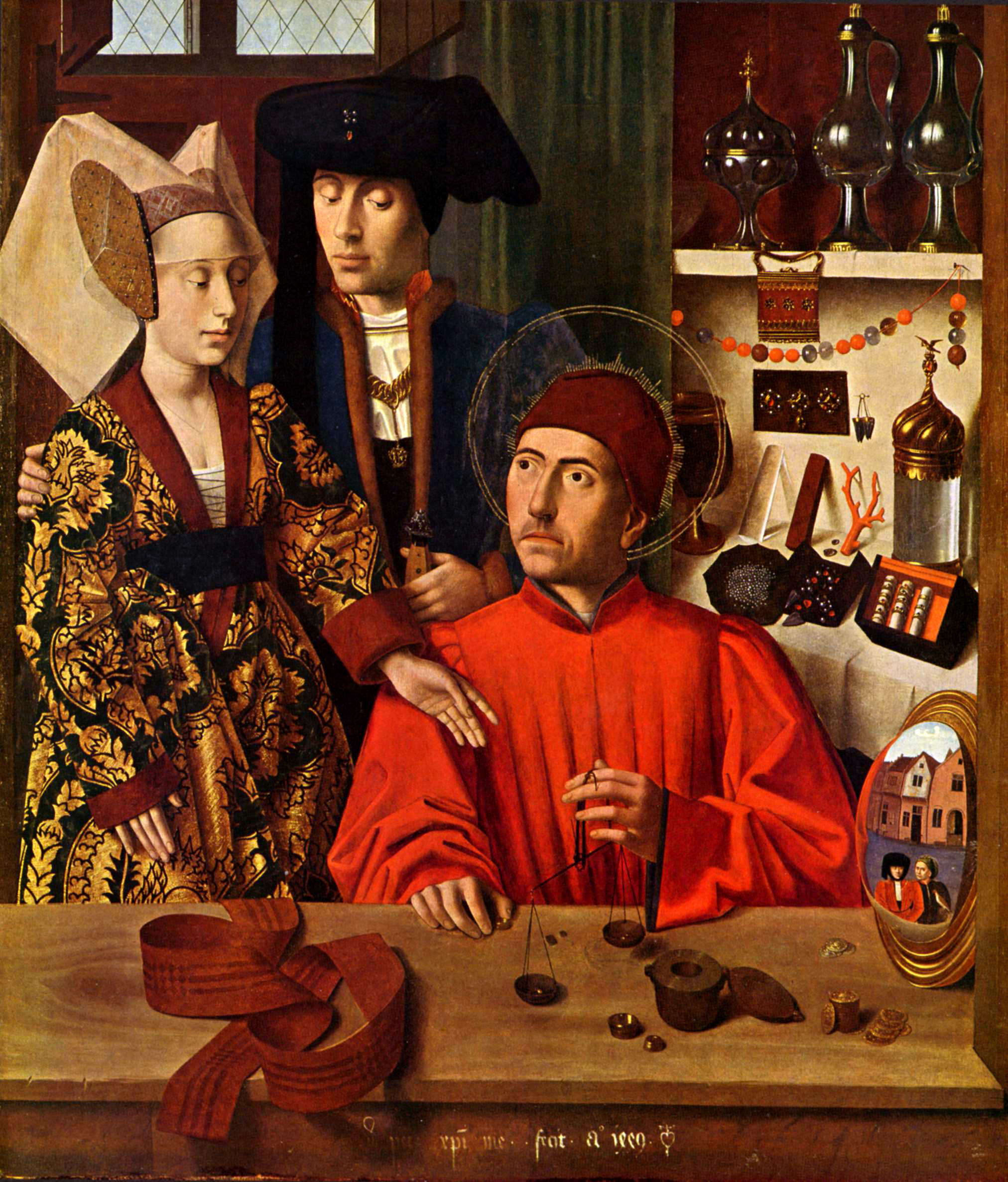
Eligius, bishop and confessor (c. 588–660)

Year 660 (DCLX) was a leap year starting on Wednesday of the Julian calendar. The denomination 660 for this year has been used since the early medieval period, when the Anno Domini calendar era became the prevalent method in Europe for naming years.

== Events ==
=== By place ===
==== Byzantine Empire ====
- Emperor Constans II is paranoid about the ambitions of his younger brother, Theodosius, and has him murdered. Having attracted the hatred of the citizens of Constantinople, Constans decides to leave the Byzantine capital and moves to Syracuse (Sicily).

==== Europe ====
- The March of the Slavs, centred north of modern Klagenfurt, preserves independence and is first mentioned in historical sources, known as Carantania (Austria).
- Felix, patrician of Toulouse, assumes the titles of Duke of Vasconia and Aquitaine. He is formally a vassal of the Franks, but rules "de facto" independently.

==== Britain ====
- King Cenwalh of Wessex becomes dissatisfied with his local bishop, Agilbert of Dorchester, as he does not speak West-Saxon. Cenwalh splits the episcopal see of Wessex in two. Wine becomes the first bishop of Winchester, by the Saxons called Wintancestir. Agilbert resigns in protest and travels north to Northumbria.
- King Sigeberht II of Essex is murdered by his brothers, Swithelm and Swithfrith, and other kinsmen for being "too ready to pardon his enemies"; that is to say, the Christians. Swithelm becomes king of Essex, with Swithfrith as joint-monarch for a period (approximate date).
- King Conall Crandomna of Dál Riata (modern Scotland) dies, and is succeeded by his nephew Domangart mac Domnaill.

==== Korea ====
- July 9 – Battle of Hwangsanbeol: Sillan forces (50,000 men) led by general Kim Yu-shin defeat the army of Baekje at Nonsan. During the fighting general Gyebaek dies at the hand of the Sillan invaders.
- Baekje in southwestern Korea is conquered by an alliance of the Tang dynasty and Silla, led by general Su Dingfang and King Munmu of Silla. The Japanese envoys detained in Chang'an are paroled.
- Emperor Gao Zong suffers from an illness (possibly slow-poisoning). His wife Wu Zetian starts to rule the Chinese Empire.

==== Japan ====
- Prince Naka no Ōe no Ōji of Japan makes a Japanese clock for the first time at Asuka, by which he causes the people to know the hours.
- After the fall of Sabi to the forces of Silla, the Yamato government sends envoys directly to the Chinese court for the first time
- The Baekje–Tang War begins, involving Yamato forces in support of the kingdoms of Baekje and Goguryeo
- Japanese forces, under command of Abe no Hirafu, massacre the Mishihase people in Hokkaido
- The capital of Japan moves from Asuka, Yamato (Okamoto Palace or Nochi no Asuka-Okamoto-no-miya) to Asakura, Fukuoka

== Births ==
- Acca, bishop of Hexham (approximate date)
- Genmei, empress of Japan (d. 721)
- John of Dailam, Syrian monk (d. 738)
- Leudwinus, Frankish bishop (approximate date)
- Mildthryth, Anglo-Saxon abbess (approximate date; died after 732)
- Rupert, bishop of Salzburg (approximate date)
- Yamanoue no Okura, Japanese poet (d. 733)

== Deaths ==
- December 1 – Eligius, bishop and saint
- Boggis, Duke of Aquitaine (approximate date)
- Conall Crandomna, king of Dál Riata (Scotland)
- Gyebaek, general of Baekje (Korea)
- Magnus, bishop and governor of Avignon
- Sigebert III, king of Austrasia (or 656)
- Sigeberht II, king of Essex (approximate date)
- Xin Maojiang, chancellor of the Tang dynasty
