= Muiredach mac Ainbcellaig =

8th-century King of Dál Riata

Muiredach mac Ainbcellaig was king of the Cenél Loairn and of Dál Riata (modern western Scotland) from about 733 until 736.

He was the son of Ainbcellach mac Ferchair. His coming to power is reported in 733, and is not obviously associated with the death of Eochaid mac Echdach, the contemporary king of Dál Riata, in the Irish annals. It is not certain who preceded Muiredach as king of the Cenél Loairn, but it may have been his cousin Dúngal mac Selbaig. Muiredach is one of the kings named in the 11th-century praise poem Duan Albanach.

It is likely that his reign ended as a result of his defeat at the hands of the Picts of Fortriu, led by Talorgan mac Fergusa, brother of Óengus, at "Cnoc Cairpri in Calathros at Etarlinde". The battle is recorded in the Annals of Ulster, but Muiredach's death is not.

The independent existence of the kingdom of the Cenél Loairn, and that of Dál Riata, probably ended in 736, after which time it formed part of the kingdom of the Picts, ruled by Óengus mac Fergusa. The next king of Dál Riata reported by the Irish annals is Áed Find, of the Cenél nGabráin, named in 768. Some Scottish sources, including the Chronicle of Melrose, have Muiredach's son Eógan as his successor.

An entry in the Annals of the Four Masters under the year 771 (corresponding with about 776 AD, but perhaps as late as 778 AD since the death of Áed Find appears in the same year) reports Muiredach's death.

| Preceded by Dúngal | King of Dál Riata; 733–736 | Vacant Title next held by Eógan mac Muiredaig |
