= Eochaid Buide =

King of Dál Riata

Eochaid Buide was king of Dál Riata from around 608 until 629. "Buide" refers to the colour yellow, as in the colour of his hair.

He was a younger son of Áedán mac Gabráin and became his father's chosen heir upon the death of his elder brothers. Adomnán's Life of Saint Columba has Columba foresee that Eochaid, then a child, will succeed his father in preference to his adult brothers Artúr, Eochaid Find and Domangart.

In 616, Eochaid Buide gave shelter to Acha of Deira and her children after her husband Æthelfrith was killed at the Battle of the River Idle, fighting her brother, Edwin of Northumbria. While at his court, they adopted Christianity. When Acha's sons returned to reclaim the kingdom at the Battle of Heavenfield, they brought Christianity with them. Her daughter Æbbe established a double monastery at Coldingham.

In the last two years of his reign, 627–629, Eochaid was apparently co-ruler with Connad Cerr, who predeceased him. Eochaid was followed by his son Domnall Brecc.

Eochaid's other sons named by the Senchus fer n-Alban are Conall Crandomna, Failbe (who died at the Battle of Fid Eoin), Cú-cen-máthair (whose death is reported in the Annals of Ulster for 604), Conall Bec, Connad or Conall Cerr (who may be the same person as Connad Cerr who died at Fid Eoin), Failbe, Domangart and Domnall Donn (not the same person as Domnall Donn unless his obituary is misplaced by 45 years like that of Ferchar mac Connaid)

According to the Fled Dúin na nGéd, Eochaid Buide was the grandfather of Congal Cáech. The story has anachronistic features as it has Eochaid alive at the time of the battle of Mag Rath (securely dated to within a year of 637), but it is chronologically feasible that Congal Cáech could have been the son of Eochaid's daughter if the identification of Cú-cen-máthair and the dating of his death is correct.

== Sources ==
- Adomnán, Life of St Columba, tr. & ed. Richard Sharpe. Penguin, London, 1995. ISBN 0-14-044462-9
- Anderson, Alan Orr, Early Sources of Scottish History A.D 500–1286, volume 1. Reprinted with corrections. Paul Watkins, Stamford, 1990. ISBN 1-871615-03-8
- Bannerman, John, Studies in the History of Dalriada. Scottish Academic Press, Edinburgh, 1974. ISBN 0-7011-2040-1

Preceded by Áedán mac Gabráin	King of Dál Riata (? co-ruler with Connad Cerr); 608–629	Succeeded by Domnall Brecc
