= Ainbcellach mac Ferchair =

Ainbcellach mac Ferchair was king of the Cenél Loairn of Dál Riata, and perhaps of all Dál Riata, from 697 until 698, when he was deposed and exiled to Ireland.

He was a son of Ferchar Fota. He is given the epithet the Good in the Duan Albanach, a praise poem from the 11th century.

It is unclear how long he remained in exile. There are reports of fighting in Dál Riata in the early 8th century which might be a conflict between Ainbcellach and his brother, Selbach mac Ferchair, or between the Cenél Loairn and the Cenél nGabráin for control of Dál Riata. Ainbcellach had certainly returned by September 719, when he was killed fighting against Selbach in "Finnglen" (perhaps near Loch Fyne).

Ainbcellach's son Muiredach was later king of the Cenél Loairn. The later Mormaers of Moray traced their descent to Ainbcellach and the Cenél Loairn through Ainbcellach's son Ruadrí.

Preceded by Eochaid mac Domangairt	King of Dál Riata; 697–698	Succeeded by Fiannamail ua Dúnchado
