= Six60 (disambiguation) =

Six60 are a New Zealand band.

Six60 may also refer to:

- Six60 (2011 album), their debut studio album
- Six60 (2015 album), their second studio album
- Six60 (2019 album), their third studio album

== See also ==
- 660
