= Fiannamail ua Dúnchado =

Fiannamail ua Dúnchado was a king of Dál Riata (modern-day western Scotland and Northern Ireland) at the end of the 7th century. Little can be said with certainty other than the recording of his death in 700AD, where he is listed as having been slain alongside Flann mac Cind-fâelad of the Cianachta Glenn Geimin in present-day County Londonderry, Northern Ireland.

His killing is reported, and he is named king of Dál Riata, by the Annals of Ulster. The Annals of Tigernach state that he was king of Dál nAraide, although he is not named in the genealogies of the Dál nAraide in the Book of Leinster. He may be the same person as Fiannamail mac Osseni who is mentioned in 699, and he is certainly the Fiannamail ua Dúnchado (Fiannamail grandson of Dúnchad) who witnessed the Cáin Adomnáin in 696–697, in which Fiachrae Cosalach is named as king of the cruithne of Dál nAraide, which argues strongly that Fiannamail was not a king of Dál nAraide.

The identity of his grandfather, Dúnchad — most commonly assumed to be the son of Conaing son of Áedán mac Gabráin — is not certain. However, many members of this family are thought to appear in the annals, including a brother of Fiannamail named Béc and an uncle named Conall. Dúnchad Bec was likely a nephew of Fiannamail.

Fiannamail is said to have had at least two sons, Indrechtach and Conall, who were killed in 741 at the battle of Forboros, perhaps fighting against the Picts led by Óengus mac Fergusa. Indrechtach son of Fiannamail is sometimes presumed to be the same person as the Indrechtach who fathered Tommaltach mac Indrechtaig, king of the Dál nAraide and Ulaid, but this Indrechtach's father is named Lethlobar in the Book of Leinster, which poses considerable problems.

== Bibliography ==
- Anderson, Alan Orr, Early Sources of Scottish History A.D 500–1286, volume 1. Reprinted with corrections. Paul Watkins, Stamford, 1990. ISBN 1-871615-03-8
- Bannerman, John, "The Scottish Takeover of Pictland" in Dauvit Broun & Thomas Owen Clancy (eds.) Spes Scotorum: Hope of Scots. Saint Columba, Iona and Scotland. T & T Clark, Edinburgh, 1999. ISBN 0-567-08682-8
- Maney, Laurance (2002). "Erratum for Volume 20/21 of the Proceedings of the Harvard Celtic Colloquium". Proceedings of the Harvard Celtic Colloquium. 22: 264–269.

Preceded by Ainbcellach	King of Dál Riata; 698–700	Succeeded by Selbach
