= Artuir mac Áedán =

7th-century Scottish leader

Artuir mac Áedáin or Artúr mac Áedán was son of Áedán mac Gabráin and a prince of Dál Riata in the 6th century. Artuir was probably a war leader fighting Picts at the northern and eastern borders of the kingdom. He and his brother Eochaid Find were killed at the battle of Miathi around 580–596 AD.

== History ==
Artuir is mentioned in three medieval sources: in Adomnan's Life of St. Columba, written c. 700; in the genealogical section of The History of the Men of Scotland, originally compiled in the seventh century; and his death is also mentioned in the Annals of Tigernach, which date from around 1088.

His name, Artuir, derived from Arthur, is Brittonic, probably related to a Welsh mother. Maithgemma, daughter of Aedan, was said to be the niece of a Brittonic king. Aedan also had two grandsons and a great-grandson with Brittonic names.

The Life of St. Columba mentions Artuir in a chapter between Aedan and Columba, where the saint predicts that Aedan's younger son, Eochaid Buide, will succeed instead of Aedan's chosen sons. Columba then predicts the deaths of Artuir, Eochaid Find, and Domangart while fighting their father's battles. Adomnan adds " Artuir and Echoid Find were slain a little while later, in the battle of Miathi mentioned above. Domangart was killed in a rout of battle in England", illustrating the fulfillment of Columba's prophecy. In the previous chapter, Adomnan portrayed Columba praying for Aedan's victory over the Miathi, indicating that the battle occurred before Columba's death in 596–597.
