= Áedán mac Gabráin =

King of Dál Riata

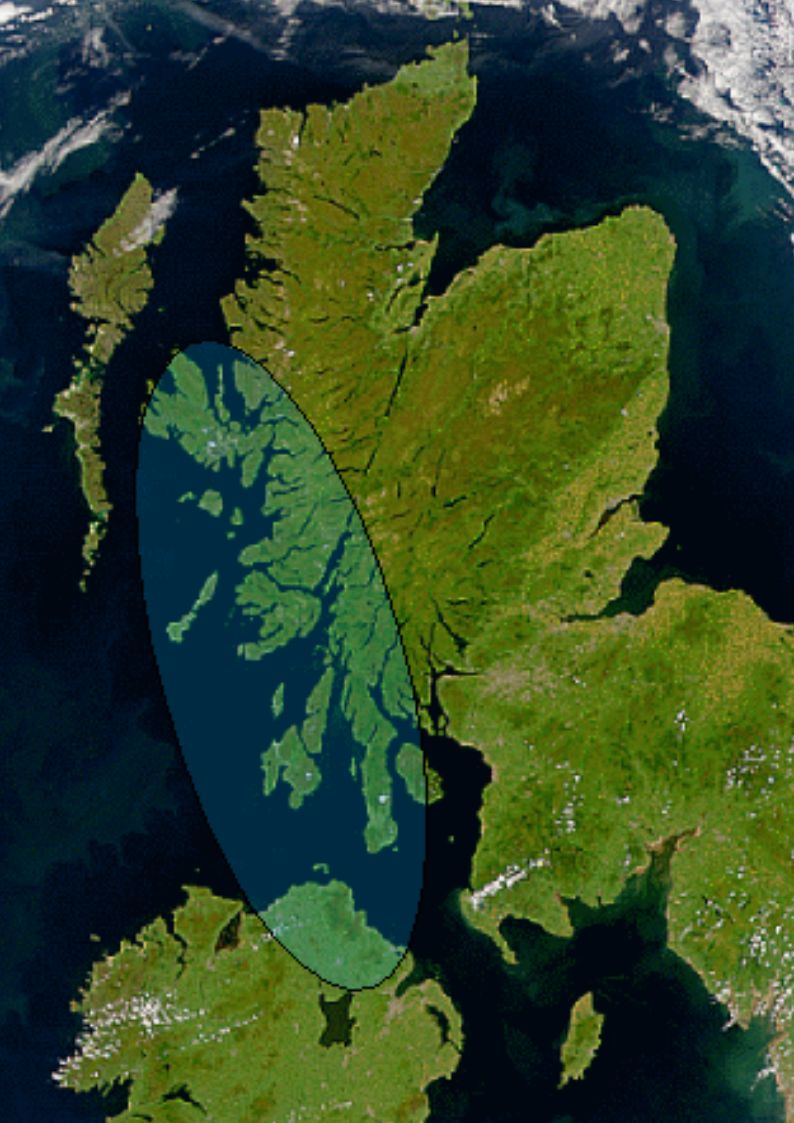
Satellite image of northern Britain and Ireland showing the approximate area of Dál Riata (shaded)

Áedán mac Gabráin (Old Irish pronunciation: [ˈaːi̯ðaːn mak ˈɡaβɾaːnʲ]; Irish: Aodhán mac Gabhráin), also written as Aedan, was a king of Dál Riata from c. 574 until c. 609 AD. The kingdom of Dál Riata was situated in modern Argyll and Bute, Scotland, and parts of County Antrim, Ireland. Genealogies record that Áedán was a son of Gabrán mac Domangairt.

He was a contemporary of Saint Columba, and much that is recorded of his life and career comes from hagiography such as Adomnán of Iona's Life of Saint Columba. Áedán appears as a character in Old Irish and Middle Irish language works of prose and verse, some now lost.

The Irish annals record Áedán's campaigns against his neighbours, in Ireland, and in northern Britain, including expeditions to the Orkney Islands, the Isle of Man, and the east coast of Scotland. As recorded by Bede, Áedán was decisively defeated by Æthelfrith of Bernicia at the Battle of Degsastan. Áedán may have been deposed, or have abdicated, following this defeat. His date of death is recorded by one source as 17 April 609, in Kilkerran.

== Sources ==
The sources for Áedán's life include Bede's Historia ecclesiastica gentis Anglorum; Irish annals, principally the Annals of Ulster and the Annals of Tigernach; and Adomnán's Life of Saint Columba. The Senchus fer n-Alban, a census and genealogy of Dál Riata, purports to record his ancestry and that of his immediate descendants. None of these sources are contemporary. Adomnán's work was written in the very late 7th century, probably to mark the centenary of Columba's death. It incorporates elements from a lost earlier life of Columba, De virtutibus sancti Columbae, by Cumméne Find. This may have been written as early as 640; neither the elements incorporated from Cumméne's work nor Adomnán's own writings can be treated as simple history. Bede's history was written 30 years after Adomnán's. The surviving Irish annals contain elements of a chronicle kept at Iona from the middle of the 7th century onwards so that these too are retrospective when dealing with Áedán's time.

The Rawlinson B 502 manuscript, dated to c. 1130, contains the tale Gein Branduib maic Echach ocus Aedáin maic Gabráin (The Birth of Brandub son of Eochu and of Aedán son of Gabrán). In this story, Áedán is the twin brother of Brandub mac Echach, a King of Leinster who belonged to the Uí Cheinnselaig kindred. Áedán is exchanged at birth for one of the twin daughters of Gabrán, born the same night so that each family might have a son. The Prophecy of Berchán also associates Áedán with Leinster. John Bannerman concluded that "[t]here seems to be no basis of fact behind these traditions." Francis John Byrne suggested that the Echtra was written by a poet at the court of Diarmait mac Maíl na mBó, an 11th-century descendant of Brandub, and was written to cement an alliance between Diarmait and the Scots king Máel Coluim mac Donnchada ("Malcolm III"), who claimed to be a descendant of Áedán. A lost Irish tale, Echtra Áedáin mac Gabráin (The Adventures of Áedán son of Gabrán), appears in a list of works, but its contents are unknown. Áedán is a character in the epic Scéla Cano meic Gartnáin, but the events which inspired the tale appear to have taken place in the middle of the 7th century. He also appears in the tale Compert Mongáin.

Áedán additionally appears in a variety of Welsh sources, making him one of the few non-Britons to figure in Welsh tradition. Welsh sources call him Aedan Bradawc, meaning "The Treacherous" or "The Wily". He may have earned this epithet after the collapse of an alliance with Rhydderch Hael, king of the nearby Brittonic kingdom of Alt Clut; the enmity between them is remembered in the Welsh Triads and elsewhere. Another Triad records Áedán's host as one of the "Three Faithful War-Bands of the Island of Britain", as they "went to the sea for their lord". This may point to an otherwise lost tradition concerning one of Áedán's sea expeditions, such as to Orkney or the Isle of Man. Additionally, several Welsh works claim a Brittonic pedigree for Áedán. The Bonedd Gwŷr y Gogledd records him as a descendant of Dyfnwal Hen of Alt Clut, though the genealogy is much confused (Gauran is given as his son, rather than father). The Cambro-Latin De Situ Brecheniauc and Cognacio Brychan claim his mother was Luan, daughter of Brychan of Brycheiniog in Wales. Though these pedigrees are inconsistent and likely dubious, they are notable in highlighting Áedán's close association with the Britons.

== Neighbours ==
Áedán was the chief king in Dál Riata, ruling over lesser tribal kings. The Senchus fer n-Alban records the sub-divisions of Dál Riata in the 7th and 8th centuries, but no record from Áedán's time survives. According to the Senchus, Dál Riata was divided into three sub-kingdoms in the 7th century, each ruled by a kin group named for their eponymous founder. These were the Cenél nGabráin, named for Áedán's father, who ruled over Kintyre, Cowal and Bute; the Cenél Loairn of northern Argyll; and the Cenél nÓengusa of Islay. Within these there were smaller divisions or tribes which are named by the Senchus. Details of the Irish part of the kingdom are less clear.

Looking outward, Dál Riata's neighbours in north Britain were the Picts and the Britons of the Hen Ogledd, the Brittonic-speaking parts of what is now Northern England and southern Lowland Scotland. The most powerful Brittonic kingdom in the area was Alt Clut, later known as Strathclyde and Cumbria. Late in Áedán's life, the Anglo-Saxon kingdom of Bernicia became the greatest power in northern Britain.

In Ireland, Dál Riata formed part of Ulster, ruled by Báetán mac Cairill of the Dál Fiatach. The other major grouping in Ulster consisted of the disunited tribes of the Cruithne, later known as the Dál nAraidi. The most important Cruithne king in Áedán's time was Fiachnae mac Báetáin. Beyond the kingdom of Ulster, and generally hostile to it, were the various kingdoms and tribes of the Uí Néill and their subjects and allies. Of the Uí Néill kings, Áed mac Ainmuirech of the Cenél Conaill, Columba's first cousin once removed, was the most important during Áedán's reign.

== Reign ==
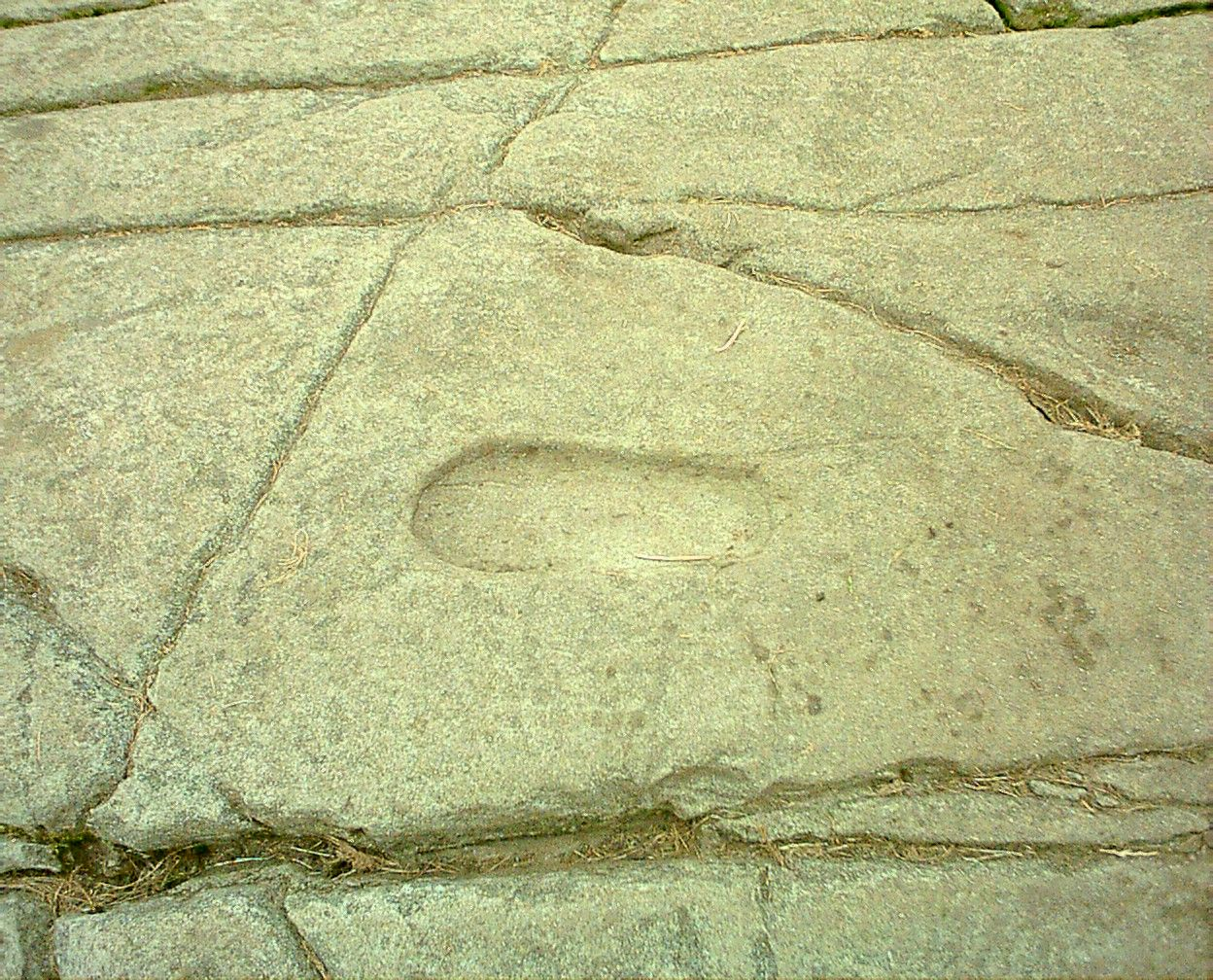
Footprint (replica) used in king-making ceremonies, Dunadd

Adomnán, the Senchus fer n-Alban and the Irish annals record Áedán as a son of Gabrán mac Domangairt (died c. 555–560). Áedán's brother Eoganán is known from Adomnán and his death is recorded c. 597. The Senchus names three other sons of Gabrán, namely Cuildach, Domnall, and Domangart. Although nothing is known of Cuildach and Domangart or their descendants, Adomnán mentions a certain Ioan, son of Conall, son of Domnall, "who belonged to the royal lineage of the Cenél nGabráin", but this is generally read as meaning that Ioan was a kinsman of the Cenél nGabráin, and his grandfather named Domnall is not thought to be the same person as Áedán's brother Domnall.

Áedán was about forty years old when he became king, following the death of his uncle Conall mac Comgaill in 574. His succession as king may have been contested; Adomnán states that Columba had favoured the candidacy of Áedán's brother Eoganán. Adomnán claims that Áedán was ordained as king by Columba, the first example of an ordination known in Britain and Ireland.

In 574, following the account of Conall's death, the Annals of Ulster and the Annals of Tigernach record a battle in Kintyre, called the Battle of Teloch, or Delgu. The precise location of the battle is unidentified. The annals agree that "Dúnchad, son of Conall, son of Comgall, and many others of the allies of the sons of Gabrán, fell." In 575, the Annals of Ulster report "the great convention of Druim Cett", at Mullagh or Daisy Hill near Limavady, with Áed mac Ainmuirech and Columba in attendance. Adomnán reports that Áedán was present at the meeting. The purpose of the meeting is not entirely certain, but one agreement made there concerned the status of Áedán's kingdom. Áedán and Áed agreed that while the fleet of Dál Riata would serve the Uí Néill, no tribute would be paid to them, and warriors would only be provided from the Dál Riata lands in Ireland.

The reason for this agreement is thought to have been the threat posed to Áedán, and also to Áed, by Báetán mac Cairill. Báetán is said to have forced the king of Dál Riata to pay homage to him at Rosnaree on Islandmagee. Áedán is thought to be the king in question, and Ulster sources say that Báetán collected tribute from Scotland. Following Báetán's death in 581, the Ulstermen abandoned the Isle of Man, which they had captured in Báetán's time, perhaps driven out by Áedán who is recorded as fighting there c. 583. Earlier, c. 580, Áedán is said to have raided Orkney, which had been subject to Bridei son of Maelchon, King of the Picts, at an earlier date.

Áedán's campaigns on the Isle of Man have sometimes been confused with the battle against the Miathi mentioned by Adomnán. The Miathi appear to have been the Maeatae, a tribe in the area of the upper river Forth. This campaign was successful, but Áedán's sons Artúr and Eochaid Find were killed in battle according to Adomnán. This battle may have taken place c. 590 and been recorded as the Battle of Leithreid or Leithrig.

The Prophecy of Berchán says of Áedán: "Thirteen years (one after another) [he will fight against] the Pictish host (fair the diadem)." The only recorded battle between Áedán and the Picts appears to have been fought in Circinn, in 599 or after, where Áedán was defeated. The annals mention the deaths of his sons here. It has been suggested that this battle was confused with the "Battle of Asreth" in Circinn, fought c. 584, in which Bridei son of Maelchon was killed. This battle is described as being "fought between the Picts themselves".

A number of Welsh traditions point to warfare between Áedán and King Rhydderch Hael of Alt Clut, the northern Brittonic kingdom later known as Strathclyde. Hector Munro Chadwick and subsequent historians suggest Áedán was initially in a long-term alliance with Rhydderch and his predecessors, but that it eventually collapsed into conflict. Adomnán reports that Rhydderch sent a monk named Luigbe to Iona to speak with Columba "for he wanted to learn whether he would be slaughtered by his enemies or not". A Welsh Triad names Áedán's plundering of Alt Clut as one of the "three unrestrained plunderings of Britain", and the poem Peiryan Vaban tells of a battle between Áedán and Rhydderch. The lost Irish epic Orgain Sratha Cluada is usually thought to refer to the attack on Alt Clut in 870 by Vikings, but MacQuarrie suggests that it may refer to an attack by Áedán on Rhydderch.

== Degsastan and after ==
Degsastan appears not to have been the first battle between Áedán and the Bernicians. The death of his son Domangart in the land of the Saxons is mentioned by Adomnán, and it is presumed that Bran died in the same otherwise unrecorded battle.

Of the roots of this conflict, Bede mentions only that Áedán was alarmed by Æthelfrith's advance. Wherever the Battle of Degsastan was fought, Bede saw it as lying within Northumbria. The battle was a decisive victory for Æthelfrith, and Bede says, carefully, that "[f]rom that day until the present, no king of the Irish in Britain has dared to do battle with the English." Although victorious, Æthelfrith suffered losses; Bede tells us his brother Theodbald was killed with all his following. Theodbald appears to be called Eanfrith in Irish sources, which name his killer as Máel Umai mac Báetáin of the Cenél nEógain, son of High-King Báetán mac Ninnedo. The Irish poem Compert Mongáin says that the king of Ulster, Fiachnae mac Báetáin of the Dál nAraidi, aided Áedán against the Saxons, perhaps at Degsastan. The Anglo-Saxon Chronicle mentions that Hering, son of King Hussa of Bernicia, was present, apparently fighting with Áedán.

After the defeat of Degsastan, the annals report nothing of Áedán until his death around six years later, perhaps on 17 April 609, the date supplied by the Martyrology of Tallaght, composed c. 800. The Annals of Tigernach give his age as 74. The Prophecy of Berchán places his death in Kintyre and says "[h]e will not be king at the time of his death", while the 12th century Acta Sancti Lasriani claims that he was expelled from the kingship. John of Fordun, writing in the 14th century, believed that Áedán had been buried at Kilkerran in Kintyre.

== Áedán's descendants ==
Áedán was succeeded by his son, Eochaid Buide. Adomnán gives an account of Columba's prophecy that Eochaid's older brothers (listed as Artúr, Eochaid Find and Domangart) would predecease their father. Áedán's other sons are named by the Senchus fer n-Alban as Eochaid Find, Tuathal, Bran, Baithéne, Conaing, and Gartnait. Adomnán also names Artúr, called a son of Conaing in the Senchus, and Domangart, who is not included in the Senchus. Domangart too may have been a grandson rather than a son of Áedán, most likely another son of Conaing. The main line of Cenél nGabráin kings were the descendants of Eochaid Buide through his son Domnall Brecc, but the descendants of Conaing successfully contested for the throne throughout the 7th century and into the 8th.

It has been suggested that Gartnait son of Áedán could be the same person as Gartnait son of Domelch, king of the Picts, whose death is reported around 601, but this rests on the idea of Pictish matriliny, which has been criticised. Even less certainly, it has been argued that Gartnait's successor in the Pictish king-lists, Nechtan, was his grandson, and thus Áedán's great-grandson.

Less is known of Áedán's daughters. Maithgemm, also recorded as Gemma, married a prince named Cairell of the Dál Fiatach. The names of Áedán's wives are not recorded, but one was said to be Brittonic, and another may have been a Pictish woman named Domelch, if indeed the Gartnait son of Domelch and Gartnait son of Áedán are one and the same.

== Notes ==
Preceded by Conall mac Comgaill	King of Dál Riata; 574–c. 608	Succeeded by Eochaid Buide
