= Ferchar Fota =

Ferchar Fota (Ferchar the Tall) (died c. 697) was probably king of the Cenél Loairn of Dál Riata, and perhaps of all Dál Riata. His father is named as Feredach mac Fergusa and he was said to be a descendant in the 6th generation of Loarn mac Eirc.

Ferchar is first reported in the Annals of Tigernach in 678, when he led the Cenél Loairn to defeat on Tiree against "the Britons", presumably those of Alt Clut. The battle is also reported by the Annals of Ulster, but Ferchar is not named. The second report of Ferchar is that of his death in 697.

Ferchar may have been king of Dál Riata from the 670s — the Duan Albanach assigns him a reign of 21 years — or he may have become king of Dál Riata only on the death of Domnall Donn in 696.

His sons Ainbcellach and Selbach were kings of Dál Riata.

| Preceded by Domangart mac Domnaill or Máel Dúin mac Conaill or Domnall Donn | King of Dál Riata ?-697 | Succeeded by Eochaid mac Domangairt |
