= Fergus Mór =

King of Gaelic kingdom (c. 430–501)

- King of Dál Riata
- Reign: to 501 (possibly 498–501)
- Predecessor: Office established
- Successor: Domangart Réti
- Born: Fergus Mór c. 430
- Died: 12 October 501
- Father: Erc of Dalriada
- Mother: Mist

Fergus Mór mac Eirc (Scottish Gaelic: Fearghas Mòr Mac Earca; English: Fergus the Great) was a possible king of Dál Riata. He was the son of Erc of Dalriada.

While his historicity may be debatable, his posthumous importance as the founder of Scotland in the national myth of medieval and Renaissance Scotland is not in doubt. Rulers of Scotland from Cináed mac Ailpín until the present time claim descent from Fergus Mór.

== Early sources ==
There is reference to the Fergus Mór tradition in the Irish notulae, Book of Armagh, although copied in the 9th century it is written in 8th-century language, possibly even 7th-century, predating the supposed invention of myth proposed by Campbell 200 to 300 years later, proving that Fergus Mór is not a product of 10th-century propaganda. The historical record, such as it is, consists of an entry in the Annals of Tigernach, for the year 501, which states: "Feargus Mor mac Earca cum gente Dal Riada partem Britaniae tenuit, et ibi mortuus est." (Fergus Mór mac Eirc, with the people of Dál Riata, held part of Britain, and he died there.) However, the forms of Fergus, Erc and Dál Riata are later ones, written down long after the 6th century. The record in the Annals has given rise to theories of invasions of Argyll from Ireland, but these are not considered authentic.

The Genealogy of Fergus is found in the king lists of Dál Riata, and later of Scotland, of which the Senchus Fer n-Alban and the Duan Albanach can be taken as examples. The Senchus states that Fergus Mór was also known as Mac Nisse Mór. These sources probably date from the 10th and 11th centuries, respectively, between 20 and 30 generations after Fergus may have lived.

The Senchus and the Duan name Fergus's father as Erc son of Eochaid Muinremuir. A Middle Irish genealogy of the kings of Alba gives an extensive genealogy for Fergus: [Fergus] m. h-Eircc m. Echdach Muinremuir m. Óengusa Fir m. Feideilmid m. Óengusa m. Feideilmid m. Cormaicc, and a further 46 generations here omitted.

These sources, while they offer evidence for the importance of Fergus Mór in medieval times, are not evidence for his historical career. Indeed, only one king in the 6th century in Scotland is known from contemporary evidence, Ceretic of Alt Clut, and even this identification rests upon a later gloss to Saint Patrick's Letter to Coroticus. The first kings of Dál Riata whose existences are reasonably sure are Fergus's grandsons Gabrán mac Domangairt and Comgall, or perhaps his great-grandson Áedán mac Gabráin.

In the contexts of Patrician tradition, legendary accounts and symbolic description, the figure twelve is mentioned with reference to the sons of Erc.

== Later accounts ==
Andrew of Wyntoun's early-15th-century Orygynale Cronykil of Scotland says that Fergus was the first Scot to rule in Scotland, and that Cináed mac Ailpín was his descendant. In addition, he writes that Fergus brought the Stone of Scone with him from Ireland, that he was succeeded by a son named Dúngal. A list of kings follows which is corrupt but bears some relation to those found in earlier sources.

If Wyntoun's account adds little to earlier ones, at the end of the 16th century George Buchanan in his Rerum Scoticarum Historia added much, generally following John of Fordun. In this version, the Scots had been expelled from Scotland when the Romans under one Maximus conquered all of Britain. His father Eugenius had been killed by the Romans, and Fergus, Fergusius II according to Buchanan's count, was raised in exile in Scandinavia. He later fought with the Franks, before eventually returning to Scotland and reconquering the Scottish lands. He was killed in battle against Durstus, king of the Picts, and was succeeded by his son Eugenius. A linked tradition traces the origin of Clan Cameron to the son of the royal family of Denmark who assisted Fergus II in the above restoration to Scotland.

Buchanan's king, James VI, shared the scholar's view of the origins of his line, describing himself in one of many verses written to his wife Anne of Denmark, as the "happie Monarch sprung of Ferguse race". Nor was James VI the last ruler to share this belief. The Great Gallery of the Palace of Holyroodhouse in Edinburgh was decorated with eighty-nine of Jacob de Wet's portraits of Scottish monarchs, from Fergus to Charles II, produced to the order of James's grandson.

James II's Irish partisans welcomed the king at Kilkenny during the Williamite War, declaring, "We conducted a Fergus to Scotland; we welcome in James the Second the undoubted heir of Fergus by the lineal descent of one hundred and ten crowned heads".

== See also ==
- Gofraid mac Fergusa, a genealogical figure who was alleged to be a son of Fergus
- Clan Fergusson, of Kilkerran House, Argyll and Bute, Scotland
- Origins of the Kingdom of Alba

== Notes ==
Preceded by Loarn mac Eirc	King of Dál Riata unknown	Succeeded by Domangart mac Ferguso
