= Conall mac Comgaill =

King of Dál Riata

Conall mac Comgaill was king of Dál Riata from about 558 until 574.

He was a son of Comgall mac Domangairt. It is said that he gave Iona to Saint Columba. The Duan Albanach says that he reigned "without dissension", but there is a report of an expedition by Conall and Colmán Bec mac Diarmato of the Southern Uí Néill to Iardoaman in the Annals of Ulster for 568. The much longer entry in the later and less reliable Annals of the Four Masters reports: "A sea fleet was brought by Colman Beg, son of Diarmaid, son of Fearghus Cerrbheoil, and by Conall, son of Comhgall, chief of Dal Riada, to Sol (Seil) and Ile (Islay), and they carried off many spoils from them."

The Senchus fer n-Alban says that Conall had seven sons: Loingsech, Nechtan, Artan, Tuathan, Tutio and Coirpe. However, Connad Cerr is taken to be a son of Conall, and the death of Conall's son Dúnchad is noted in the Annals of Ulster and the Annals of Tigernach, leading the army of the "sons of Gabrán" in Kintyre.

Royal titles
Preceded by Gabrán mac Domangairt	King of Dál Riata; 558–574	Succeeded by Áedán mac Gabráin
