= Conall Crandomna =

King of Dal Riata

Conall Crandomna was king of Dál Riata (modern western Scotland) from about 650 until 660.

The Senchus fer n-Alban makes him a son of Eochaid Buide and thus a member of the Cenél nGabráin. The Duan Albanach has him succeed Ferchar mac Connaid of the Cenél Comgaill, which had not yet separated from the Cenél nGabráin. He was co-ruler with Dúnchad mac Conaing until 654, after which he was apparently sole ruler.

His sons Máel Dúin mac Conaill and Domnall Donn may have been kings of Dál Riata.

His death in 659 or 660 is reported by the Annals of Ulster. He was probably succeeded by his nephew Domangart mac Domnaill

Preceded by Ferchar mac Connaid	King of Dál Riata; Co-ruler 650–654; Alone 654–660; With: Dúnchad mac Conaing	Succeeded by Domangart mac Domnaill
