= Lúcás Ó Dalláin =

Irish historian

Lúcás Ó Dalláin (fl. 14th century) was an Irish historian.

Lúcás Ó Dalláin is credited with compiling a 14th-century version of Senchus Fer n-Alban, originally compiled in the 10th century. Now referred to as Ms. H.2.7 and held by Trinity College Dublin, it is the most important of a number of manuscripts of the Senchus. Ó Dalláin is believed to have written the text while working with Seán Mór Ó Dubhagáin (died 1372). It was preserved and used by Dubhaltach Mac Fhirbhisigh, and subsequently Edward Lhuyd.

Little else appears to be known of Ó Dalláin himself.
