= Eochaid mac Echdach =

King of Dál Riata

Eochaid mac Echdach was king of Dál Riata (modern western Scotland) from 726 until 733. He was a son of Eochaid mac Domangairt.

Eochaid came to power as king of Dál Riata in 726, presumably deposing Dúngal mac Selbaig, son of Selbach mac Ferchair. Selbach may have tried to restore his son to power, and fought against Eochaid's supporters at Irros Foichnae in 727, but without apparent success. The annals vary as to whether the despatch of a fleet from Dál Riata to Ireland to aid Flaithbertach mac Loingsig in his war with Áed Allán should be placed in the reign of Eochaid, or that of his successor.

At his death in 733, Eochaid is named king rather than lord of Dál Riata, which may suggest that after the defeat of Dúngal and Selbach his reign was unchallenged. His son, Áed Find, was later king of Dál Riata.

As Dál Riata certainly maintained a separate existence until 736, Eochaid must have had a successor, or successors. It appears that he was succeeded by Muiredach mac Ainbcellaig, who had replaced Dúngal mac Selbaig as king of the Cenél Loairn.

Preceded by Dúngal mac Selbaig	King of Dál Riata; 726–733	Succeeded by Muiredach mac Ainbcellaig
