= Cenél Loairn =

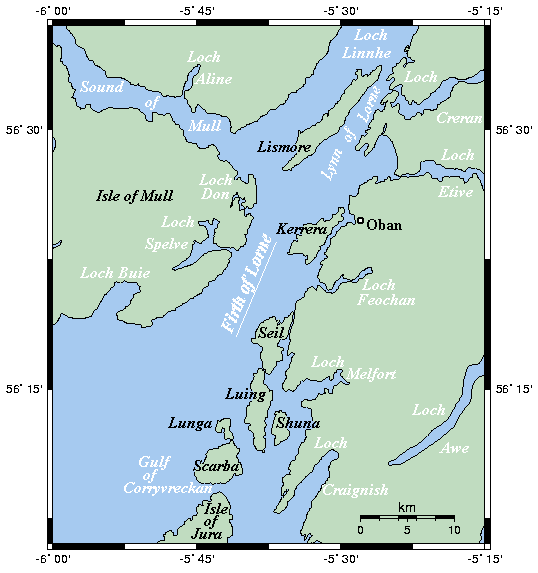
The Firth of Lorne

Cenél Loairn, the descendants of Loarn mac Eirc, controlled parts of northern Argyll around the Firth of Lorne, in what was then the kingdom of Dál Riata during the early Middle ages.

Cenél Loairn was one of three main kindreds in early Dál Riata: Cenél nGabráin appears to have been centred in Kintyre and Knapdale to the south while Cenél nÓengusa ruled the islands of Islay and Jura. Around 700 a fourth group, the Cenél Comgaill, split from the Cenél nGabráin and controlled Cowal and Bute.

The foundation myth for the early rulers of the territory traces the lineage of these kindreds back to Erc of Dalriada, a fifth century Irish king, but the first king of Dál Riata to claim Cenél Loairn descent was Ferchar Fota (died c. 697).

The chief religious site of Cenél Loairn may have been on Lismore but with the arrival of the Vikings in the late 8th century it is likely the island was soon absorbed into the Norse-Gael Kingdom of the Isles.

Excavations of key sites associated with the kindred provide some insight in to the agriculture of the period and indicate that an extensive trade network with distant cultures was in place. A few fragments of poetry from the period survive along with king lists and other records held by religious houses.

Cenél Loairn’s later influence, probably in response to the Scandinavian take-over of the isles, seems to have transferred to Moray the rulers of which province claimed descent from the kindred as late as the 12th century.

== Geography ==
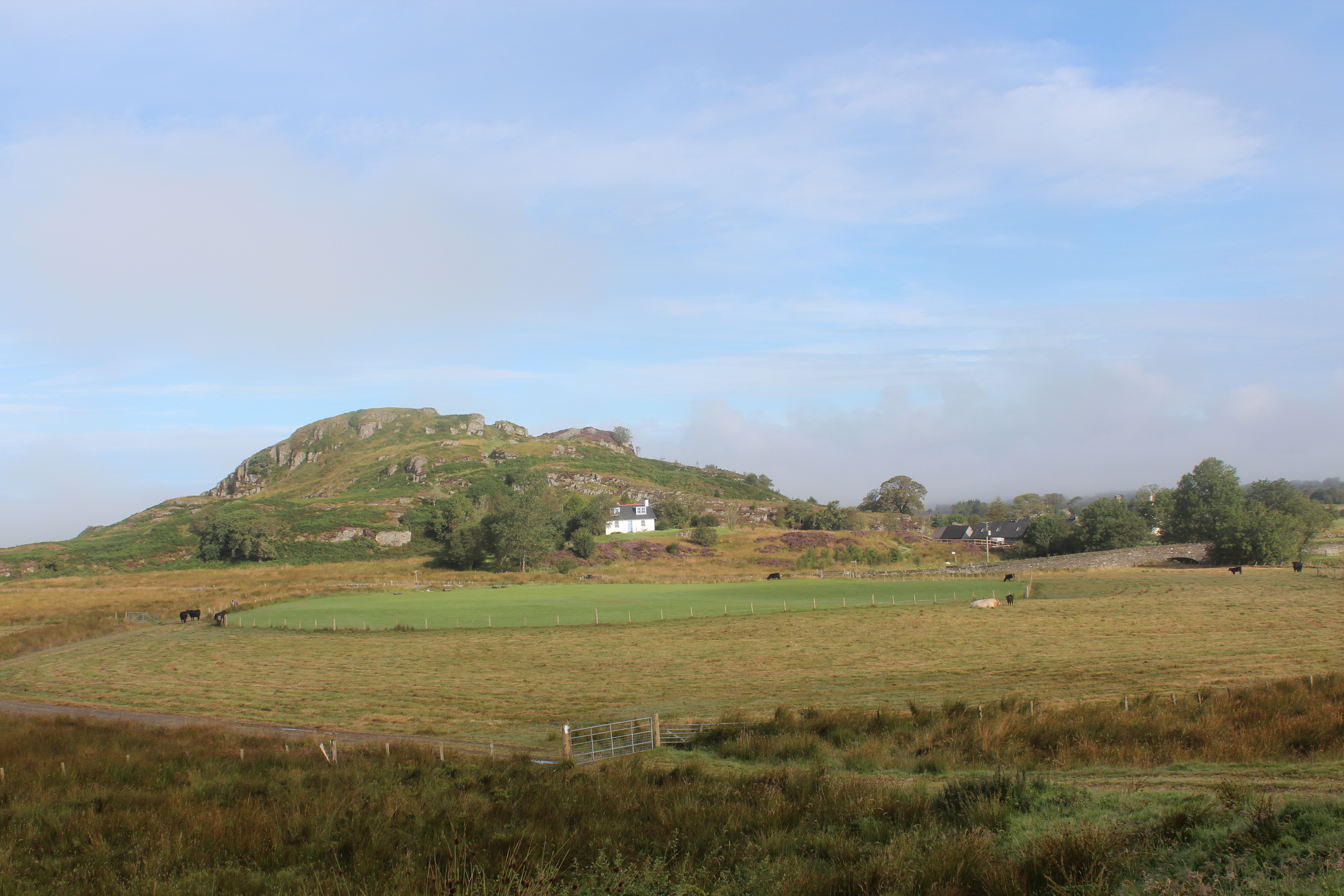
The crag of Dunadd, the site of a royal fort of Dál Riata

Cenél Loairn territory was centred in modern Lorne, which takes its name from this kin group. They likely also controlled the islands of Mull, Tiree, Coll and Colonsay, the Morvern and Ardnamurchan peninsulas and parts of Lochaber. (Note: Chadwick states that the "early ownership of Colonsay is unknown".) The boundary to the east was the Druim Alban mountain ridge that separated Dál Riata from Pictland.

The chief places of the kingdom appear to have been at Dun Ollaigh near Oban and Dunadd, near Crinan. The royal site of Dunadd lay at the southern edge of their territory in the midst of the lands of the main kindred groups and was a locus of the high kings of Dál Riata although there is no direct evidence that Dun Olaigh was subordinate to Dunadd. Dunstaffnage Castle is located just north of Dun Ollaigh and guards the entrance to Loch Etive. The extant structure dates from the 13th century although it has been suggested that it may stand on the site of a 7th century predecessor.

In addition to the main fortifications the remains of numerous other duns and crannog sites have been found throughout the area. Examples of the former include Dun an Fheurain at Ardalanish on Mull and An Dun, Clenamacrie in Glen Lonan near Oban. The 7th century Senchus fer n-Alban, which is the oldest known census in Britain, lists hundreds of "houses", which indicates that a substantial number of other dwellings existed as well. For every twenty "houses" the cenela were required to provide a crew for two seven-bench fighting ships and Cenèl Loairn had 420 such houses and a muster strength of 600. Dál Riata as a whole had a military force that was about 2,000 strong. (Note: In the 1980s 114 duns were recorded in assumed Cenél Loairn territory of which an estimated 105 were in use at the time of this census. These duns therefore make up only 25% of the total number of houses.)

== Kin groups ==
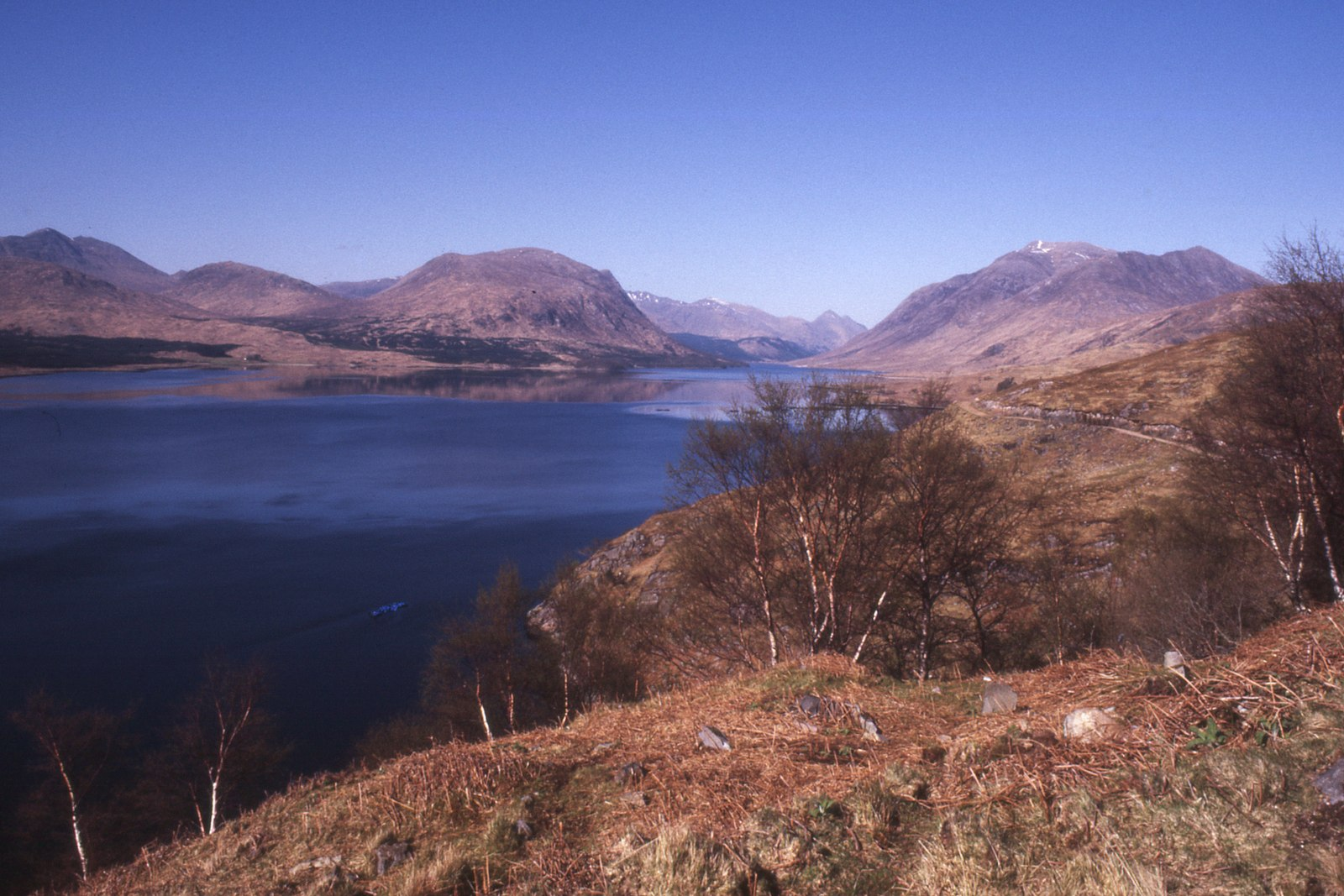
Loch Etive, which divides Upper Lorn, the lands of Cenél nEchdach, from Mid Lorn, controlled by Cenél Cathboth

Gaelic society of the period was divided into tuath - kin groups - that were hierarchical in form, with a class of serfs or slaves at the bottom of the social scale, a caste of free citizens who worked the land in the middle and an aristocratic group at the apex who provided the warriors and kings. The ri tuath might be, in turn, subservient to a ruiri or overking who might be governed by a ri ruirech or high king. There is very little evidence that the neighbouring Dál Riatan kindreds managed to hold sway over Cenél Loairn prior to 695 and it is likely that the creation of a high kingship of Argyll originates around this time.

The Senchus identifies three sub-groups of Cenél Loairn: Cenél nEchdach, Cenél Cathboth and Cenél Salaich. This may mirror the modern division of Lorne into "Upper Lorn and Mid Lorn divided by Loch Etive, and the rugged country of Nether Lorn west of Loch Awe" with Cenél nEchdach dominating Benderloch and Morvern, Cenél Cathboth controlling Dun Ollaigh (near modern Oban), and Cenél Salaich centred on the island of Seil off the coast of Nether Lorn. (Note: The largest Iron Age fort in Lorn is Dun Ormidale at Gallanach about 5 kilometres (3.1 mi) south of Oban and a similar distance north of Seil. It is about 3 ha (7.4 acres) in extent and its use is estimated from 1500 BC to 800 AD but no modern excavation work has been undertaken Argyll having been “woefully neglected by archaeologists”.) Fraser (2010) suggests that that Mull “was probably not controlled by Cenél nEchdach” and speculates that this may have been Cenél Cathboth territory.

It is possible that the segment of Cenél nEchdach that dominated the kingship of Lorn in the early eighth century traced their descent from Baítán mac Echdach, a great-grandson of Loarn mac Eirc. The ‘Cenél Baítáin’ was identified by W. F. Skene as located in “the most northerly part of Dalriada” (Note: Watson identifies other place names in the area that relate to “Baodán’s tribe” but ascribes this to an unidentified saint of the same name, and excludes Baithéne mac Brénaind as a candidate.) and the evidence from medieval records may indicate that this group were centred in Morvern with other segments of Cenél nEchdach based in adjacent Upper Lorn and Ardnamurchan.

== Early Kings of Lorne and Dál Riata ==
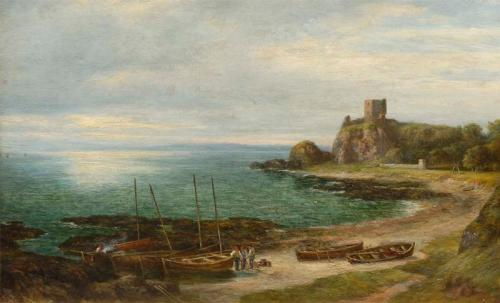
Dunollie Castle in 1865 by Sir George Reid. The earlier Dun Olaigh was "probably the principal royal stronghold of the Lorne high kings". It was burnt in 685, possibly by Ferchar Fota prior to his seizing of the kingship of Cenél Loairn, and rebuilt by his son Selbach. (Note: Dun Ollaigh defensive work dated to the seventh to ninth centuries comprised a "small but thick-walled drystone fort". Later features included a vertically revetted rubble rampart that "may reflect Selbach’s rebuilding in 714", which lasted until the 10th century.)

The nature of the early settlement of the area by Gaelic-speaking peoples from Ireland is uncertain. Irish tradition tells of Cairbre Riata moving his people from Munster, first to Ulster and then to Kintyre and the Inner Hebrides c. 220 CE. It has been suggested that the relationship of the Dalriadic Scots to the indigenous inhabitants of Argyll was one of conquest and settlement and on the other hand that "they came in peace as Celts to a Celtic land", possibly to assist the Picts in their resistance to Rome. Archaeologists have been unable to find any evidence of large scale migration into Argyll in the early medieval period and some scholars claim that the Gaels in this part of Scotland were indigenous to the area. (Note: Nonetheless, Woolf concludes that "the Irish language was brought to Scotland by people migrating from Scotland to Ireland." The logic used is partly on the basis of Ptolemy ascribing the name Epidii to the tribe occupying Argyll and Ebudae Insulae to the Hebrides, which information may have come to him from voyages undertaken in the first century CE, indicating the earliest date at which this migration could have occurred. Watson took the view that Ptolemy's Epidion is specifically Islay.)

The “Chronicle of the Kings of Dalriata’’ provides a foundation myth for the early rulers of the territory. Each of the three original kindreds traced their heritage back to one of three brothers, the sons of Erc of Dalriada, who are also listed in the late-14th century Book of Ballymote. Loarn mac Eirc was the founder of Cenél Loairn. Fergus Mór mac Eirc is credited as the first high king of Dál Riata who reigned for three years until his death in 501 and his grandson Gabrán mac Domangairt gave rise to Cenél nGabráin. The third brother, Óengus Mór mac Eirc, supposedly gave rise to Cenél nÓengusa. However, it is not for 75 years or more later that a "frail narrative" begins to emerge in relation to the kings of Dál Riata in the surviving records created close in time to the period. (Note: The nature of the foundation of Dál Riata by the three brothers is contradicted in the Cethri prímchenéla Dáil Riata which refers to four main kindreds including Cenél nEchdach in northern Argyll. Hunter describes the names of the three founders as "reputed or actual".)

The extant records suggest that during the 7th century the kings of Dál Riata were Cenél nGabráin or Cenél Comgaill dynasts (Note: The role of Oswiu, the powerful king of Berenicia from 642, in maintaining Cenél nGabráin dominance in the mid-7th century is a matter of debate. After the death of his father Æthelfrith c. 616 he and his brother Oswald went into exile and their hosts may have been the nobility of Dál Riata. Oswiu was a supporter of Iona during his reign and, according to Bede, exacted tribute from both the Picts and Gaels.) until close to the end of that century when their dominance was challenged by the Cenél Loairn. However, this “may represent a partisan estimation of the significance of that kindred in hindsight” and it is possible that prior to that time the kingdoms of Lorn and Islay may have been independent polities for substantial periods.

The first king of Dál Riata to claim descent from Loarn was Ferchar Fota (Note: Ferchar is described in the Book of Ballymote as being the "son of Ferdach, son of Fergus, son of Nechtan, son of Colum, son of Baetan, son of Eochaid, son of Muiredach, son of Loarn Mor, son of Erc".) of Cenél nEchdach. The Annals of Tigernach record the defeat of the Cenél Loairn led by Ferchar Fota on Tiree at the hands of the “Britons” in 678, which is the earliest reference to the kindred in the surviving annals. Ferchar's ascent to the high-kingship in the 690s followed an ambitious military campaign in Ireland by his predecessor Domnall Donn. The records for the period are contradictory but Ferchar's short reign may have been followed by Eochaid mac Domangairt of Cenél nGabrain, then shortly thereafter by Ferchar's son Ainbcellach of Cenél Loairn who was deposed and exiled to Ireland in 698 perhaps at the hands of Cenél Cathboth.

His brother Selbach mac Ferchair then turned the tables, exacting "slaughter" on Cathboth and assuming the kingship of Lorne and as rex Dáil Riata in 701 or 702. Selbach was powerful enough to maintain his position for more than twenty years, fighting against the Strathclyde Britons at the unidentified location of "Lorg Ecclet" and besieging the Cenél nGabrain seat of Dunaverty in 711. A defeat in a sea battle against the king of Kintyre Dúnchad Bec in October 719 weakened his position and in 723 he retired to a monastery, making way for his son Dúngal. Things did not go well for Dúngal. In 726 he was deposed as king of Dál Riata by his cousin Muiredach mac Ainbcellaig. Selbach returned to the fray to assist his son's forces at the battle of Ros Foichnae but died three years later in 730. In 733 Dúngal was deposed by Muiredach as king of Loairn as well following the former's "outrageous" kidnapping of the powerful Pictish king Onuist's son Bridei from a monastery on Tory Island in a seeming act of desperation.

Muiredach's reign may have ended in 736 as a result of his defeat at the hands of Talorgan mac Fergusa, the brother of Onuist, at "Cnoc Coirpri in Calathros at Etarlinde". By 741 Argyll had been “decisively annexed” by Onuist. As this coincided with a period of domination by Cenél Loairn in Argyll and Lorne is at the opposite end of Glen Albyn to Pictavia it is possible that Onuist saw this as a more of a threat than the over-kingship of Dál Riata residing in Kintyre with the Cenél nGabráin.

== Religion ==
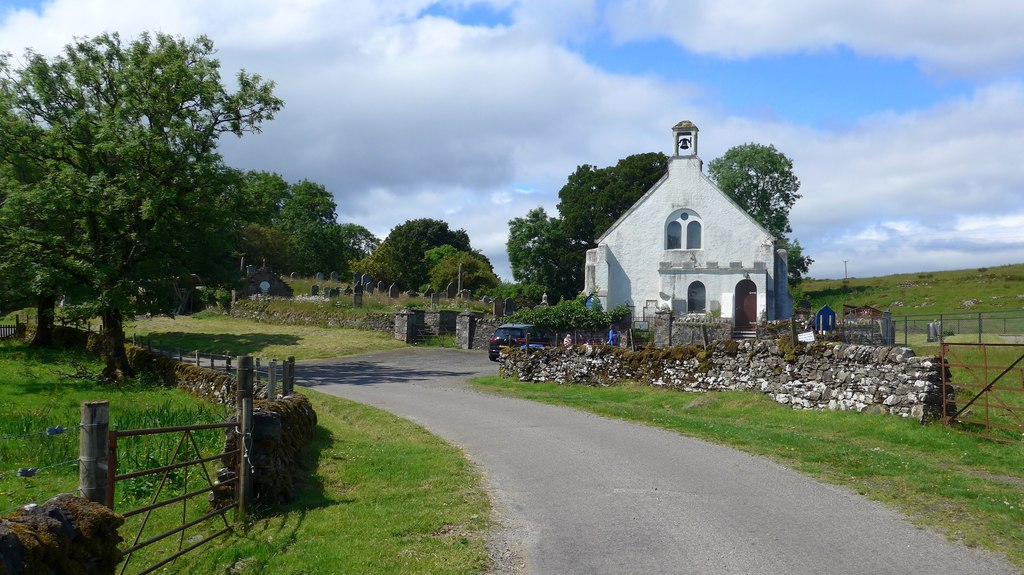
St Moluag's Cathedral, Lismore. Parts of the building date to the 13th century and the vicinity is the probable site of Moluag's original 6th century monastery.

Christianity probably arrived in Ireland via Roman Britain and was developed enough by 431 for the first bishop to be appointed to the "Irish believing in Christ". A feature of early Irish Christianity was the domination of monks and abbots rather than priests and bishops as was common elsewhere in Europe and the creation of early Christian monastic sites in Argyll and beyond provides some insight into the importance of religion in early Dál Riatan culture and that of their immediate neighbours. Especially so for the lands to the north beyond Ardnamurchan for which the record is otherwise very sparse. (Note: Hunter writes that the inhabitants of Shetland, Orkney, Skye and the Western Isles "appear to have been Pictish in culture and speech at this time" but that the influence of Pictish kings there and in Caithness and the northwestern seaboard would have been less significant than in their heartland surrounding modern Inverness.)

Columba's arrival on Iona in 563 is well-known although his relationship with Cenél Loairn is not clear. The Celtic monastic system made use of isolated retreat centres they called 'deserts' and there were several smaller monastic settlements associated with Iona. Tiree had one, the island of Hinba another. The latter's location is unknown although it is likely located somewhere in Argyll. (Note: The location of Hinba is much-debated. Youngson writes that "MacEachern is the only scholar to write on the subject who pays any attention at all to the fact that in extract XXI [of his Life of Columba] Adomnán refers to an island called Hinbina - presumably "Little Hinba". Only Colonsay and Oronsay provide a large and little island".) There were also similar outlying colonies on Elene Insula (off Islay) and Scia (Skye).

Other Irish monks in the area included Donnán who arrived on Eigg around 600 AD establishing a monastery at Kildonnan. Columba had warned him of the dangers of settling in Pictish territory and Donnan was murdered on Eigg along with 52 of his monks in 617. Beccan may have had a hermitage on Rùm by 632. and Moluag may have established himself on Raasay in the late sixth century. Máel Ruba founded a monastery at Applecross in 672, a move possibly linked to the support of Cenél nGartnait, a sept of Cenél nGabráin who were active in Skye at the time and who may have developed some kind of arrangement with Cenél Loairn.

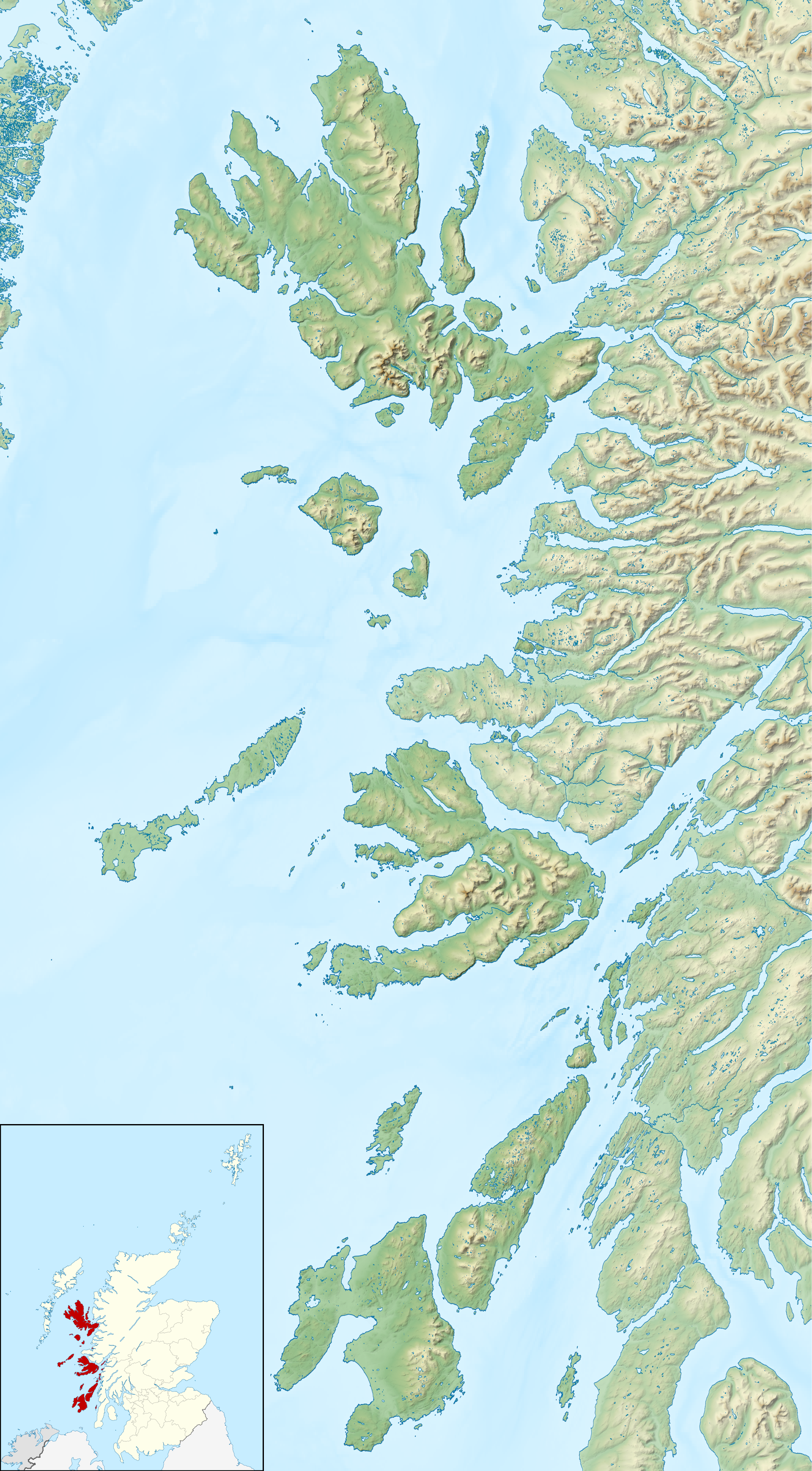
The western seaboard of mainland Scotland and the Inner Hebrides. (Note: Skye lies to the north with Raasay and Applecross (on the mainland) to the east. South of Skye are the "Small Isles" of Rùm and Eigg. Mull lies south of the Ardnamurchan peninsula with Lismore at the entrance to the Firth of Lorne. In the south east are Colonsay, Islay and Jura west of Knapdale and Kintyre.)

The chief religious site of Cenél Loairn may have been on Lismore, which lies "in the cockpit of the territory of Lorn". It may have originally been a daughter house of Bangor Abbey (Note: There is no reason to suppose that Lismore was a daughter house of Columba's abbey on Iona.) and was later the seat of the high-medieval bishop of Argyll. The Iona Chronicle records the death of Moluag in 594, who may have been the abbot of Lismore, and of subsequent abbots up to c. 640. (Note: Moluag went on to found two other important centres in the land of the Picts at Rosemarkie and Mortlach and created numerous other establishments in the north-east such as the Clova Monastery in Kildrummy. He died in the Garioch and was buried at his monastery in Rosemarkie.) Lismore probably maintained its status as the principal religious house of the Cenél Loairn during the remainder of the 7th century and five further such obituaries are recorded in the latter half of the 8th century. (Note: However, Moluag's efforts notwithstanding, by about 700 Iona had established primacy in Pictavia.) With the arrival of the Vikings in the late 8th century it is likely both Lismore and Iona were soon absorbed into the Norse-Gael Kingdom of the Isles with the latter being sacked in 802 and 806. (Note: Various named Viking leaders, who were probably based in Scotland, appear in the annals in the 9th century including an unnamed king of "Viking Scotland" whose heir, Thórir, took an army to Ireland in 848. Eventually Magnus Barelegs established direct, if temporary, Norwegian overlordship over this sprawling sea kingdom by 1098.) (Note: Moluag later became the patron saint of Argyll as evidenced by a charter in 1544 from the Earl of Argyll, which states "in honour of God Omnipotent, the blessed Virgin, and Saint Moloc, our patron".)

There is other evidence of smaller religious sites in Cenél Loairn lands. For example the monastic site of Clyvernock sits opposite the fortress of Dunollie on the isand of Kerrera. Adomnán offers a few insights into the religious lives of the laity. For example holy wells were venerated, as elsewhere in the Highlands.

== Commerce and agriculture ==
Excavations at Dunadd have provided important information about early medieval life in Argyll. Rotary querns were used to grind barley and oats and there is evidence of the consumption of cattle, sheep and pigs. The remains of pottery drinking vessels indicate they were imported from France and glassware found there may have had the same origin. Imported seeds such as coriander and dill were found along with a fragment of the yellow Mediterranean pigment orpiment. It is not clear how such a trade network of this nature developed as early as the late sixth and seventh centuries but it is likely that the Christian church had a crucial role. There is also evidence of iron and leather-working, of tin imported from Cornwall and of moulds used to create ornate brooches. Some of the bird head brooch designs indicate a distinct Dunadd style based on a fusion of Anglo-Saxon and Irish fashions. A large hoard of weaponry was also found including fragments of a sword, spearheads and crossbow bolts.

1978 work on the early levels at Dun Olaigh including evidence of Neolithic or Bronze Age occupation. For those dating to the 7th to 9th centuries the dig uncovered a bronze worker's hearth and clay moulds for producing stick pins along with an iron spearhead, arrow tips, bone and antler pins and an antler comb. A more exotic find was a shard from a painted glass bowl of 3rd century Roman manufacture. The Dun Olaigh evidence for meat consumption is similar to that of Dunadd although the sample size was small. 64% of the identifiable fragments were cattle, with 19% pig, and sheep and goats totalling 17%. Fish was represented by only 3 bones, red deer only by antlers, and there was no evidence at all of other game or fowl. Excavations of a crannog at Loch Glashan (just beyond the southern edge of Lorne) produced preserved wooden objects such as bowls, a bucket, a spoon and a paddle.

== In literature ==
Beccan of Rùm (previously a monk at Iona) is known to have been conservative on doctrinal matters. If he was one and the same as Beccan mac Luigdech there are surviving examples of his poetry that suggest a passionate personality. He wrote of Columba:

In scores of curraghs with an army of wretches he crossed the long-haired sea.
He crossed the wave-strewn wild region,
Foam flecked, seal-filled, savage, bounding, seething, white-tipped, pleasing, doleful.

The Duan Albanach (Song of the Scots) is a 27 verse Gaelic poem dating from the 11th century. In it Ainbcellach mac Ferchair and Muiredach mac Ainbcellaig are described as "the Good" and the unfortunate Dungall mac Selbach as "the impetuous".

== Viking era ==
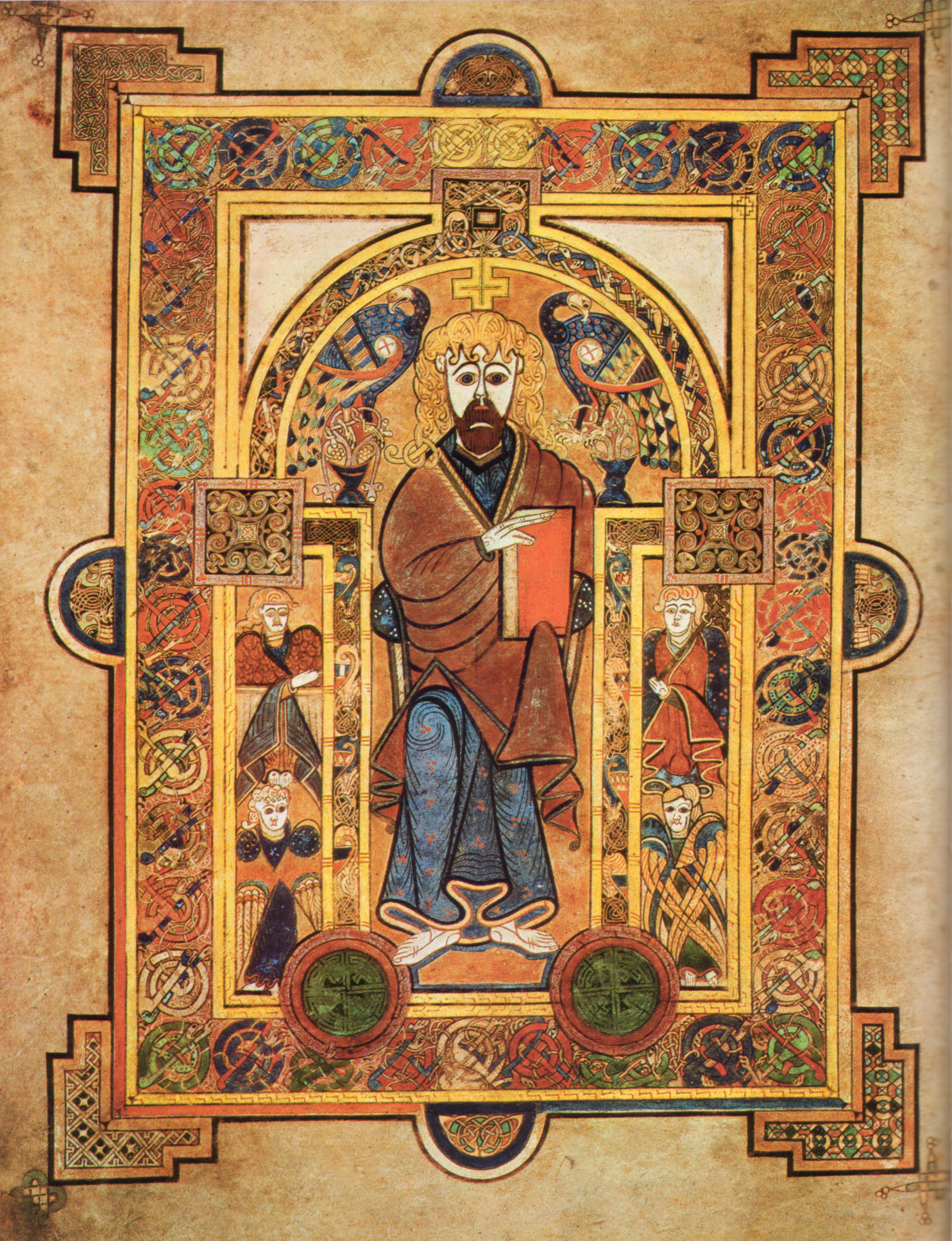
Folio 32v of the Book of Kells which may have been produced by the monks of Iona and taken to Ireland for safekeeping after repeated Viking raids of the Hebrides.

With the arrival of Norse raiders on the western seaboard of Scotland towards the end of the 8th century the power of the Gaels in Argyll fell into decline. The king of Fortriu, Eógan mac Óengusa, and the king of Dál Riata, Áed mac Boanta, were among the dead after a major defeat by the Vikings in 839. At some point in the 9th century, the beleaguered kingdom of Dál Riata lost the Hebrides to the Vikings, when Ketil Flatnose is said to have founded the Kingdom of the Isles. (Note: Hunter states that Ketil was "in charge of an extensive island realm and, as a result, sufficiently prestigious to contemplate the making of agreements and alliances with other princelings", but stops short of describing him as a monarch.)

Kingships of Dál Riata are recorded after this time but none are considered to be Cenél Loairn dynasts. The heritage of these later rulers is not clear and only a probably fabricated pedigree has survived linking the Cenél nGabráin with the later House of Alpin and the Kings of Scotland.

It is possible that the modern names of Angus and Gowrie in eastern Scotland reflect the movement of Cenél nÓengusa and Cenél nGabráin refugees fleeing Norse incursions in the west. Similarly, Cenél Loairn populations may have re-settled in Moray. In high-medieval times, the Mormaers of Moray claimed descent from Loarn commencing with Findláech mac Ruaidrí (died 1020) and including Macbeth King of Alba. (Note: Other Mormaers of this line include: Máel Coluim mac Máil Brigti, Gille Coemgáin mac Máil Brigti, MacBeth's stepson Lulach mac Gille Coemgáin (also king of Alba), Máel Snechtai mac Lulaich and Oenghus mac inghine Lulaich.)

== Legacy and interpretations ==
Historians in the latter half of the 20th century were able to confidently declare that the Gaels "forged the Scottish nation" but scholarship undertaken since then suggests a more complex picture, stressing the importance of other cultures, especially the Picts and the Bernicians.

There was a merger of the Dál Riatan and Pictish crowns under Cínaed mac Ailpín (Kenneth MacAlpin) in the 840s and the House of Alpin became the leaders of a combined Gaelic-Pictish kingdom. The means by which Cínead unified the Pictish and Dál Riatan kingdoms is poorly documented. (This is in part because the records from Iona cease in 740.) It seems likely that increasing family links between the two polities and the decline of the west in the face of Norse incursions were the main factors rather than military force. Cínaed is traditionally understood to have been the founder of modern Scotland, the Chronicle of the Kings of Scotland stating that he was "first of the Scots". Circa 900 a family tree was created that made Áedán mac Gabráin of Cenél nGabráin his ancestor. Whatever the accuracy of this genealogy it was clearly important to the Gaelic-speaking Scots royal house to be able to trace their ancestry back to its supposed Irish roots.

Similarly, it was evidently important to the early mormaers of Moray to be able to trace their ancestry back to Cenél Loairn, although once again the veracity of this has been disputed. (Note: Woolf (2007) writes: "It seems far-fetched to imagine that Findláech's claim [to royalty] was based on such ancient history".)

== See also ==
- Origins of the Kingdom of Alba
- List of monarchs of Scotland
- Scottish island names
