= Eochaid mac Domangairt =

King of Dál Riata

Eochaid mac Domangairt (died c. 697) was a king of Dál Riata (modern western Scotland) in about 697. He was a member of the Cenél nGabráin, the son of Domangart mac Domnaill and father of Eochaid mac Echdach; Alpín mac Echdach may be a son of this younger Eochaid.

He is named in Dál Riata king-lists, the Duan Albanach and the Synchronisms of Flann Mainistrech. In some sources he is called Eochaid Crook-Nose (Riannamail), but modern readings take this as being a garbled reference to Fiannamail ua Dúnchado rather than an epithet.

The death of Eochu nepos Domnaill (Eochaid grandson of Domnall Brecc) is reported in the Annals of Ulster for 697, slain by Fiannamail ua Dúnchado.

Preceded by Ferchar Fota	King of Dál Riata; 697	Succeeded by Ainbcellach mac Ferchair
