= Domangart Réti =

- King of Dalriada
- Reign: c. 501–507
- Predecessor: Fergus Mór
- Successor: Comgall mac Domangairt

Domangart Réti was king of Dál Riata in the early 6th century, following his father's death, Fergus Mór.

He had at least two sons: Comgall and Gabrán, both of whom became kings in succession. The Tripartite Life of St. Patrick states that he was present at the saint's death, c. 493. Domangart died around 507 and was succeeded by Comgall.

His byname, Réti, appears in Adomnán's Life of Saint Columba, in the form Corcu Réti, perhaps a synonym for Dál Riata. Corcu, a Primitive Irish language term for a kin group, usually combined with the name of a divine or mythical ancestor, is similar to the term Dál. Alternatively, rather than representing an alternative name for all of Dál Riata, it has been suggested Corcu Réti was the name given to the kin group which later divided to form the Cenél nGabráin of Kintyre and the Cenél Comgaill of Cowal, thus excluding the Cenél nÓengusa of Islay and the Cenél Loairn of middle and northern Argyll.

== See also ==
- Origins of the Kingdom of Alba

Preceded by Fergus Mór	King of Dál Riata unknown	Succeeded by Comgall mac Domangairt
