= Dúngal mac Selbaig =

King of Dál Riata

Dúngal mac Selbaig was king of Dál Riata. His reign can best be placed in the years 723 to 726, beginning with the abdication of his father, Selbach mac Ferchair, who entered a monastery, and ending with the rise of Eochaid mac Echdach of the Cenél nGabráin. The High Medieval praise poem Duan Albanach names Dúngal the Impetuous, and claims that he ruled for seven years.

For over a generation before Dúngal's reign the Cenél Loairn, to which he belonged, and the Cenél nGabráin had contested for control of Dál Riata. It seems that Dúngal's father had finally managed to defeat his rivals shortly before he abdicated. For whatever reason, Dúngal soon lost power to the Cenél nGabráin. His father left the monastery and attempted to restore his son, but failed.

While Dúngal was no longer king of Dál Riata after 726, it may be that he remained ruler of the Cenél Loairn. Certainly he retained some following. In 731, he burned Tairpert Boitir, most probably Tarbert on Loch Fyne which was in the lands of the Cenél nGabráin and possibly a portage site.

In 733 the Annals of Ulster report that Dúngal profaned Tory Island by forcibly removing Bruide, who is presumed to be the son of Óengus mac Fergusa, king of the Picts. This entry is followed by the statement that Dúngal's cousin, Muiredach mac Ainbcellaig, became king of the Cenél Loairn, and it seems probable that the rise of Muiredach, and Dúngal's epithet, stem from his doings on Tory Island.

In 734 Dúngal fled to Ireland, "to escape the power of Óengus". Dúngal later returned to Scotland, and was captured in 736, along with his brother Feredach, by Óengus. Their subsequent fates are unknown.

Preceded by Selbach mac Ferchair	King of Dál Riata; 723–726	Succeeded by Eochaid mac Echdach
