= Scéla Cano meic Gartnáin =

The Scéla Cano meic Gartnáin (English: The Story of Cano mac Gartnáin) is an Old Irish prose tale of the ninth century or later. It forms part of the Cycles of the Kings.

It deals with the exile and return of Cano mac Gartnáin in sixth century Scotland. The tale involves historical figures such as Cano himself; Gartnán or Gartnait his father; Áedán mac Gabráin, the king of Dal Riada; Diarmait and Blathmac, sons of Áed Sláine; Guaire Aidne of the Uí Fiachrach, the king of Connacht and father of Cano's true love Créd.

The Irish annals contain a number of entries which may suggest that there is a kernel of truth behind the literary invention in the surviving tale, although Cano Garb mac Gartnáin, Guaire Aidne and the sons of Áed Sláine flourished more than half a century after Áedán mac Gabráin.

== Manuscript sources ==
- Yellow Book of Lecan (YBL), pp. 128a-132b.
- B IV 2 (RIA, Dublin), written by Michael O'Clery in 1627/8: poem of lines 450–497.

== Editions and translations ==
- Binchy, Daniel A. (ed.). Scéla Cano meic Gartnáin. Mediaeval and Modern Irish Series 18. Dublin: DIAS, 1963. Reprinted 1975. Edition available from CELT
- Meyer, Kuno (ed.). "Scéla Cano meic Gartnáin. From Yellow Book of Lecan, col. 786 (p.128a)." Anecdota from Irish Manuscripts I, ed. O.J. Bergin et al. Halle, 1907. 1-15.
- Thurneysen, Rudolf (tr.). "Eine irische Parallele zur Tristan-Sage." Zeitschrift für romanische Philologie 43 (1924): 385–402. Addenda and corrigenda in Zeitschrift für celtische Philologie 16 (1926): 280–2. German translation available from CELT
