= Battle of Strathyre =

654 battle

The Battle of Strathyre (Old Irish: Sráith Ethairt) took place in 654 near Balquhidder in the Scottish Highlands, between the forces of Talorgan son of Eanfrith of the Picts and Dúnchad mac Conaing of Dál Riata.

The battle may have been the result of a failed invasion of what is now Stirlingshire by Dúnchad, a traditional "inaugural raid" (crech rig) by Talorgan to mark the beginning of his rule, or an attack on Dál Riata by Talorgan on behalf of the Northumbrian king Oswiu, of whom Talorgan was the nephew and puppet king.

The Annals of Tigernach record the victory of Talorgan, and both the Annals of Tigernach and the Annals of Ulster record the slaying of Dúnchad.

== Bibliography ==
- Calise, J. M. P. (2002). "Personal Names Associated with the Picts: Biographical and Textual Notes". Pictish Sourcebook: Documents of Medieval Legend and Dark Age History. Westport, CT: Greenwood Publishing Group. pp. 171–261. ISBN 9780313322952.
- Fraser, James E. (2009). From Caledonia to Pictland: Scotland to 795. New Edinburgh History of Scotland. Edinburgh: Edinburgh University Press. ISBN 9780748612321.
- Williams, Ann; Smyth, Alfred P.; Kirby, D.P. (1991). A Biographical Dictionary of Dark Age Britain: England, Scotland and Wales c.500 - c.1050. London: B. A. Seaby. ISBN 9781852640477.
