= John Bannerman (historian) =

Scottish historian

John Walter MacDonald Bannerman (13 August 1932 – 8 October 2008) was a Scottish historian, noted for his work on Gaelic Scotland.

== Biography ==
He was born in Balmaha, Stirlingshire, the son of John MacDonald Bannerman, later Lord Bannerman of Kildonan, and his wife Ray Mundell. His family was native speakers of Scottish Gaelic, and after leaving school Bannerman studied Celtic languages at the University of Glasgow. He then studied for a second degree in Anglo-Saxon and Kindred Studies at Emmanuel College, Cambridge, graduating in 1958 with a first, and went on to complete his doctorate there in 1964 under the supervision of Kathleen Hughes.

Although he considered teaching Gaelic in schools, Bannerman instead took up a post at the Celtic department of the University of Aberdeen before joining the history department at the University of Edinburgh in 1967. He took over the running of the family farm at Balmaha in 1968, shortly before his father's death, dividing his time between teaching at the university, writing, and farming.

His work on Gaelic Scotland was influential. His early works on Dál Riata, the Senchus fer n-Alban, and the Iona chronicles which formed part of the later Chronicle of Ireland are contained in his 1974 book Studies in the History of Dalriada. He was a major contributor to the record of Late Medieval Monumental Sculpture in the West Highlands published in 1977 and his study of the Beaton family—The Beatons: Medical Kindred in the Classical Gaelic Tradition—appeared in 1986. In his later years he worked on the history of the Lordship of the Isles. He retired from teaching in 1997 and took up farming full-time at Balmaha.

Bannerman married Chrissie Dick in 1959. They had five children.
