= Selbach mac Ferchair =

Selbach mac Ferchair (died 730) was king of the Cenél Loairn and of Dál Riata. Selbach's existence is well-attested as he is mentioned repeatedly in Irish annals.

== Life ==
Selbach mac Ferchair was a son of Ferchar Fota. He ruled as king of the Cenél Loairn from around 698 until his abdication in 723, but it may be that he was undisputed ruler of Dál Riata only in the final years of his reign.

He is known to have had two sons, Dúngal and Feredach. Selbach's father, brother, son and nephew are included among the predecessors of Máel Coluim mac Donnchada (Malcolm III) of Scotland in the Duan Albanach praise poem, but Selbach is not. This may be a form of Damnatio memoriae.

Although Selbach is first mentioned after the death of Fiannamail ua Dúnchado (died 700), it seems likely that he had deposed his brother Ainbcellach in 698. In 701 he destroyed Dún Olaigh, but whether this was in a war against Ainbcellach, against a king of the rival Cenél nGabráin, or some other enemies, is unknown. A number of battles involving Dál Riada are recorded in the time of Selbach, a defeat in Glen Lemnae in 704, and victories over the Britons at Lorg Ecclet in 711 and again at "the rock called Minuirc" in 717, but Selbach is not named in these reports. In 712 Selbach besieged Aberte (Dunaverty, near Southend, Kintyre, in the lands of the Cenél nGabráin) and rebuilt Dún Olaigh in 714.

In September 719 Selbach fought against his brother Ainbcellach at Finnglen (perhaps near Loch Fyne). Ainbcellach was killed in the battle. A month later he faced the Cenél nGabráin, led by their king Dúnchad Bec, also called king of Cenn Tíre (Kintyre), in a sea battle off Ard Nesbi. Selbach was defeated, but Dúnchad Bec died in 721, which may have left Selbach as the unchallenged king of Dál Riata.

In 723 Selbach abdicated and retired to a monastery, at which time one annalist calls him lord of Dál Riada. He was probably succeeded by his son Dungal, who was replaced by Eochaid mac Echdach in 726. Selbach is found in 727 fighting against the supporters of Eochaid at Irros Foichnae.

== See also ==
- List of legendary kings of Scotland

Preceded by Fiannamail ua Dúnchado	King of Dál Riata; 700–723	Succeeded by Dúngal
