= Domnall Brecc =

7th-century king of Dál Riata

Domnall Brecc (Welsh: Dyfnwal Frych; English: Donald the Freckled) (died 642 in Strathcarron) was king of Dál Riata, in modern Scotland, from about 629 until 642. He was the son of Eochaid Buide. He was counted as Donald II of Scotland by the scholar Fraxinius.

He first appears in 622, when the Annals of Tigernach report his presence at the battle of Cend Delgthen (probably in the east midlands of Ireland) as an ally of Conall Guthbinn of Clann Cholmáin. This is the only battle known where Domnall Brecc fought on the winning side.

Domnall suffered four defeats after he broke Dál Riata's alliance with the Cenél Conaill clan of the Uí Néill. In Ireland, Domnall and his ally Congal Cáech of the Dál nAraidi were defeated by Domnall mac Áedo of the Cenél Conaill, the High King of Ireland, at the Battle of Mag Rath (Moira, County Down) in 637. He also lost to the Picts in 635 and 638 and lastly to Eugein I of Alt Clut at Strathcarron in 642, where he was killed.

A stanza interpolated into the ancient Welsh poem Y Gododdin refers to these events:

I saw an array that came from Pentir,

And bore themselves splendidly around the conflagration.
I saw a second one, rapidly descending from their township,
Who had risen at the word of the grandson of Nwython.
I saw great sturdy men who came with the dawn,

And the head of Dyfnwal Frych, ravens gnawed it.

Domnall's son Domangart mac Domnaill was later to be king of Dál Riata and from him the later kings of the Cenél nGabráin were descended. A second son, Cathasach, died c. 650, and a grandson of Domnall, also called Cathasach, died c. 688.

== Notes ==
Preceded by Eochaid Buide	King of Dál Riata; 629–13 December 642	Succeeded by Ferchar mac Connaid
