= Gabrán mac Domangairt =

King of Dál Riata in the mid-6th century

Gabrán mac Domangairt (Old Welsh: Gawran map Dinwarch) or Gabrán the Traitor (Gwran Wradouc) was king of Dál Riata in the mid-6th century. He is the eponymous ancestor of the Cenél nGabráin. Gabrán was the son of Domangart Réti and the father of Áedán mac Gabráin.

The historical evidence for Gabrán is limited to the notice of his death in the Irish and Welsh annals. It is possible that Gabrán's death should be linked to a migration or flight from Bridei mac Maelchon, but this may be no more than coincidence.

== See also ==
- Origins of the Kingdom of Alba
- List of monarchs of Scotland

== Notes ==
Preceded by Comgall mac Domangairt	King of Dál Riata c.540–560	Succeeded by Conall mac Comgaill
