= Senchus fer n-Alban =

10th-century Old Irish text

The Senchus fer n-Alban (The History of the men of Scotland) is an Old Irish medieval text believed to have been compiled in the 10th century. It provides genealogies for kings of Dál Riata and a census of the kingdoms which comprised Dál Riata.

== Description ==
The Senchus exists in a number of manuscripts, of which the most important belonged to Dubhaltach Mac Fhirbhisigh and then to Edward Lhuyd. This, Ms. H.2.7 held by Trinity College Dublin, was compiled in the 14th century by Lúcás Ó Dalláin, probably working with Seán Mór Ó Dubhagáin (died 1372), the chief poet and historian of the Uí Maine. This manuscript was once thought to have formed part of the Book of Uí Maine, but this is no longer considered plausible. Other examples are found in the Book of Ballymote (1384x1406), the Book of Lecan (before 1418), and in Mac Fhirbhisigh's 17th-century genealogical compilations. It may have been derived from earlier documents of the 7th century which are presumed to have been written in Latin.

The Senchus is a relatively short document, around 70 or 80 lines of type depending on the variant used. To it is appended the Genelaig Albanensium which contains genealogies of Máel Coluim mac Cináeda and Causantín mac Cuilén, kings of Alba, and of Ainbcellach mac Ferchair and other Dál Riata kings.

Most versions of the Senchus follow the late myth of the Dál Riata origins by beginning with Eochaid Muinremar and the sons of Erc, Fergus Mór among them. Mac Fhirbhisigh's own version of the Senchus traces Dál Riata to the Síl Conairi and Cairpre Riata (Rígfhota), son of Conaire Mór and/or Conaire Cóem, who may be the Reuda of Bede's Historia ecclesiastica gentis Anglorum. The Genelaig Albanensium, and the similar genealogies in the Rawlinson B 502 manuscript, make Cairpre Riata an ancestor in the tenth or fifteenth generation of Fergus Mór mac Eirc.

The historical value of the Senchus rests largely in its later sections, which include historical kings of Dál Riata — myth may end and history begin in the reign of Conall mac Comgaill in the middle of the 6th century. The last king who can be identified in the genealogies contained in the Senchus proper is Conall Crandomna, who died around 660.

The Senchus lists the divisions of Dál Riata—the Cenél nGabráin, the Cenél Loairn, and the Cenél nÓengusa—and their obligations for military service, apparently at a time when the Cenél Comgaill remained part of the Cenél nGabráin. These divisions need not be of great antiquity, and the lists provided are not without problems. The Senchus lists no kindreds or military obligations for the Irish lands, if any, which may have formed part of Dál Riata. One curious feature of the Senchus is the presence of Airgíalla in the lands of the Cenél Loairn. It is not apparent whether these represent settlers from Ireland, or simply people to whom the label "additional clients" was applied.

The Senchus lists what is believed to be the oldest reference to a naval battle in the British Isles. There is a brief record of an engagement between rival Dalriadan groups in 719.

== See also ==
- The Prophecy of Berchán
- Duan Albanach
- Pictish Chronicle
- Chronicle of the Kings of Alba
- Deda mac Sin
