= Duan Albanach =

Middle Gaelic poem

The Duan Albanach (Song of the Scots) is a Middle Gaelic poem. Written during the reign of Mael Coluim III, who ruled between 1058 and 1093, it is found in a variety of Irish sources, and the usual version comes from the Book of Lecan and Book of Ui Maine.

It follows on from the Duan Eireannach, which covers the earlier mythological history of the Gael.

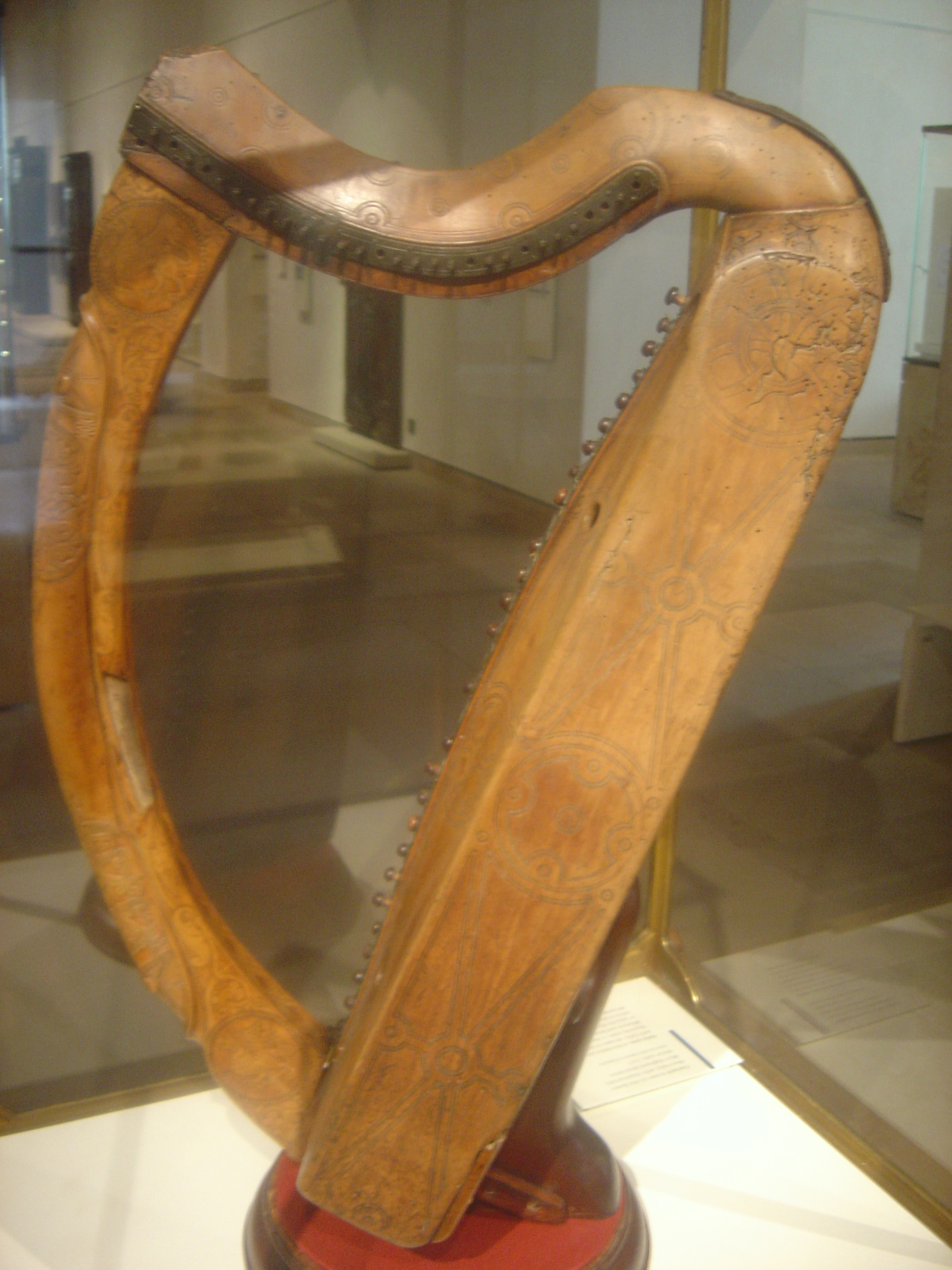
The harp (or clarsach) was an instrument associated with medieval Scottish culture. This one, now in the Museum of Scotland, is one of only three surviving medieval Gaelic harps.

It is a praise poem of 27 stanzas, probably sung at court to a musical accompaniment by the harp. If performed in a public context, it is possible that the audience would have participated in the performance.

The Duan recounts the kings of the Scots since the eponymous Albanus came to Alba. The poem begins with the following stanzas.

A eolcha Alban uile,	O all ye learned of Alba !
a shluagh feuta foltbhuidhe,	Ye well skilled host of yellow hair !
cia ceud ghabhail, an eól duíbh,	What was the first invasion – is it known to you?
ro ghabhasdair Albanruigh ?	Which took the land of Alba ?
Albanus ro ghabh, lia a shlógh,	Albanus possessed it, numerous his hosts;
mac sen oirdérc Isicon,	He was the illustrious son of Isacon,
brathair is Briutus gan brath,	He and Brutus were brothers without deceit,
ó ráitear Alba eathrach.	From him Alba of ships has its name.

In the final stanzas it is seen that the poem dates from the time of Malcolm III, in the second half of the 11th century.

Se bliadhna Donnchaid glain gaoith	The six years of Donnchad the wise,
xuii bliadhna mac Fionnlaoich,	Seventeen years the son of Findláech;
tar és Mec Beathaidh go m-blaidh,	After Mac Bethad, the renowned,
uii mís i f-flaithios Lughlaigh.	Seven months was Lulach in the sovereignty.
Maolcholuim anosa as rí,	Máel Coluim is now the king,
mac Donnchaidh dhata dhrechbhi,	Son of Donnchad the florid, of lively visage,
a ré nocha n-fidir neach,	His duration knoweth no man
acht an t-eólach as éolach. A eolcha.	But the Wise One, the Most Wise. O ye learned.

== See also ==
- The Prophecy of Berchán
- Pictish Chronicle
- Chronicle of the Kings of Alba
- Senchus fer n-Alban
- Flann Mainistreach
