= Reiter (disambiguation) =

Reiter (German for horserider), is a type of cavalry, which appeared in the armies of Western Europe in the 16th century

Reiter may also refer to:

- Reiter (surname), a German surname
- Der Blaue Reiter (The Blue Rider), a German group of expressionist artists in the early 20th century
- Die Apokalyptischen Reiter, a German heavy metal band
- Reiter, Washington, a community in the United States

== See also ==
- Reiter's syndrome (now known as reactive arthritis)
- Reuter
- Rieter, a Swiss producer of textile machinery and automobile components
- Reitter
