= Reuther =

Surname

Reuther is a surname. Notable people with the surname include:

- Bernd Reuther (born 1971), German politician
- Danny Reuther (born 1988), German football player
- Ronald Theodore Reuther (1929–2007), naturalist and zoo manager
- Victor G. Reuther (1912–2004), international labor organizer
- Walter Reuther (1907–1970), American labor union leader

== Other uses ==
- Walter P. Reuther Library, Archives of Labor and Urban Affairs on the campus of Wayne State University in Detroit
- Reuther's Treaty of Detroit, five-year contract negotiated by trade union president Walter Reuther
- Walter P. Reuther Freeway (I-696)
- Walter Reuther Central High School, high school located in downtown Kenosha, Wisconsin
- Dutch Ruether, Walter Henry Ruether (1893–1970), U.S. baseball player
- Reuther, one of the legendary kings of Scotland
- Reuther is the given name of a female character in Anna Katharine Green's novel Dark Hollow (1914)

== See also ==
- Reuter (surname)
- Ruether (surname)
