= Legendary kings of Scotland =

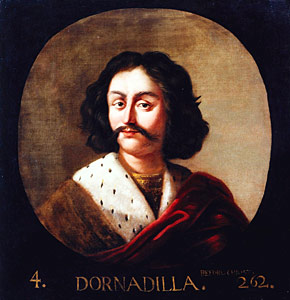
Dornadilla, fourth legendary king according to George Buchanan; painting by Jacob Jacobsz de Wet the Younger in the commission from Charles II for Holyrood Palace.

The Scottish Renaissance humanist George Buchanan gave a long list of Scottish Kings in his history of Scotland—published in Latin as Rerum Scoticarum Historia in 1582—most of whom are now considered by historians to be figures of legend, or completely misrepresented. The list went back around 1900 years from his time, and began with Fergus I. James VI of Scotland, who was Buchanan's pupil, adopted the story of Fergus I as his ancestor, and the antiquity of the line was emphasised by the House of Stuart.

== Dynastic importance ==
The genealogy of Scottish kings, going back to Fergus mac Ferchar (i.e. Fergus I) and beyond, was in place by the middle of the 13th century when it was recited at the 1249 inauguration of Alexander III of Scotland. In 1301 Baldred Bisset was involved in a hearing at the Papal Curia, on the Scottish side of the debate on Edward I of England's claims, and at least helped prepare material dealing with the mythological history that was being adduced as relevant, on both sides.

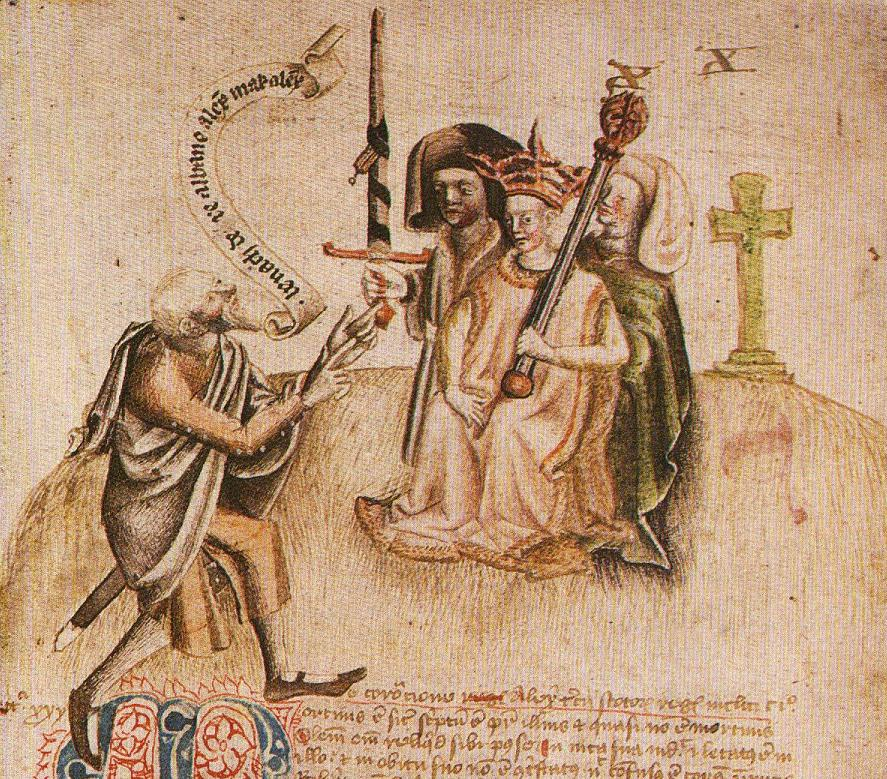
Alexander III hears his genealogy; late medieval illustration of the Scotichronicon.

The question of the antiquity of the Scottish royal lineage, and even the details of the associated origin myth, became particularly significant from 1542 when Mary, Queen of Scots came to the Scottish throne. Buchanan alluded to Mary's long ancestry in his Epithalamium written for her 1559 marriage to Francis II of France. In the period before Mary's betrothal, a marriage to Prince Edward, the future Edward VI of England, was much discussed. As part of that debate, the list of legendary kings of Britain became involved, in the form of the "Brutus myth", promoted by Edward Hall over the doubts of Polydore Vergil. Publicists on the English side of the argument, including John Elder, James Henrisoun, and William Lamb, had cast doubt on Scottish history.

When James VI entered Edinburgh in 1579 the pageantry included a public posting of the genealogy of the Scottish kings; and when his son Charles I visited in 1633, portraits of 107 kings were displayed, some of which (by George Jamesone) survive. Another series of 110 imagined portraits of the monarchs from the list was painted for Charles II by Jacob de Wet II, and hung in Holyrood Palace. The de Wet portrait collection later became a noted sight for tourists, for example as written about by John Macky, A Journey through Scotland.

== Historiography of Buchanan's list ==
While Rerum Scoticarum Historia was published only in the year of Buchanan's death, he had worked on it during much of his life. It was published with his De jure regni apud Scotos, first printed in 1579. Of the two works, the Historia for Buchanan served as a source of precedents on dealing with bad kings (tyrants in the list inevitably come to a sorry end at the hands of the people, in line with Buchanan's monarchomach position), while the De jure is cast as a humanist dialogue between Buchanan himself and Thomas Maitland, and concentrates on classical exemplars. Both works were dedicated to James VI. King James came to regard the chronicles of Buchanan and John Knox as "infamous invectives".

The king-list of the Historia was, therefore, in that work, only incidental to Buchanan's purpose in the book, whatever later uses it may have been put to. After the later scholarly work of Thomas Innes, this list was given little credence in its initial parts. It was, however, the culmination of centuries of development of king-lists for the Kingdom of Scotland. Much fictional material had been introduced into these lists by the humanist Hector Boece, writing half a century before Buchanan. Peter Hume Brown in his biography of Buchanan describes him as somewhat more sceptical than Boece in what he accepted as historical; but less so than John Mair, writing earlier. Buchanan has been called inconsistent in his treatment of classical sources since his rejection of the legend of Gathelus does not extend to the early Scottish kings, who are equally unsupported by classical authors.

Writers who perpetuated the Boece tradition, as put into form by Buchanan, included:

- Alexander Gardyne, Theatre of the Scotish Kings [sic], published 1709 by James Watson
- David Hume of Godscroft
- Gilbert Gray
- James Ussher
- James Wallace, The History of the Kingdom of Scotland from Fergus the First King to the Union (1724)
- John Johnston, Inscriptiones Historicæ Regum Scotorum, continuata annorum serie a Fergusio I. ad Jacobum VI. (1602)

The antiquity of the line was attacked by William Lloyd, who argued that Scotland was not settled before the 6th century; George Mackenzie published the 1685 Defence of the Antiquity of the Royal Line of Scotland against Lloyd, and a sequel the next year against Edward Stillingfleet, who had given a sceptical account of Boece's history in Chapter V of his Origines Britannicae. The work of Innes, which in effect terminated the scholarly debate, was published in 1729, but the tradition continued.

- Francis Nichols, The British Compendium (1741)
- James Anderson, Royal Genealogies (1732). This book was based on a work of Johann Hübner, but with Anderson's additions. The king-list is Table 499, attributed to Boece and Buchanan.
- William Guthrie.

Subsequently, John Pinkerton and William Forbes Skene contributed to the study of the king-lists. Reference works continued, however, to copy Buchanan's list, and the mythological history took many years to drop out of circulation, persisting in print as factual well into the 19th century (for example the fourth edition of the Encyclopædia Britannica (1810), the Encyclopædia Perthensis (1816), the London Encyclopedia (1829), and the individual kings in reference books by George Crabb and John Platts).

== Legendary content ==
See list of Scottish monarchs for the view of contemporary historians of Scotland. The first historical figure in Buchanan's list is Caratacus. The rediscovery of the works of Tacitus prompted Boece to include this well-attested figure from the period of the Roman occupation of Britain.

The last legendary figure is more complex to discuss. The kings in the list from about the 6th century (in the Fifth Book of Buchanan) onwards may have some relationship to historical figures in the Kingdom of Dalriada, extending in present-day terms from western Scotland to part of Ireland. See list of Kings of Dál Riata. But the Kingdom of Scotland (i.e. Alba) was not a historical reality until Kenneth MacAlpin created it in the year 843, and what was said about his predecessors in the list by Buchanan may have little historical foundation.

The list of Kings of the Picts includes other historical figures reigning in parallel with the Dalriada kings, in other areas of what is now Scotland. The critical Essay (1729) of Innes, while demolishing the king-list going back to Boece, substituted in part kings of the Picts, and is now regarded as questionable in its own way. Innes was a Jacobite and concerned therefore to lay emphasis on legitimacy of descent and primogeniture.

== Legendary kings (Buchanan), BC ==
Numbering (Buchanan)	Name	Accession date (Buchanan)	Alternate names	Comments
1	Fergus I	330 BC		The first king of Scotland, according to the fictitious chronology of Boece and Buchanan. He is said to have come to Scotland from Ireland about 330 BC to assist the Scots already settled in Scotland against the joint attack of the Picts and Britons. He is then said to have gone back to Ireland to quell disturbances, and to have been drowned in the passage off the rock or port which got the name of Carrick Fergus from him. According to John Fordoun, Andrew of Wyntoun, and most of the earlier genealogical lists of Scottish kings, the same account is given of the settlement of the Scots from Ireland by a King Fergus, son of Ferchard. According to other lists, Ferchard or Feardach, the father of Fergus, was the first and Fergus the second king.
2	Feritharis	305 BC	Ferithais (Bellenden)	Brother of Fergus, and in Buchanan's view elected king.
3	Mainus	290 BC		
4	Dornadilla	262 BC	Dorvidilla (Bellenden)	The identification of Dun Dornaigil as Dornadilla's castle is mentioned in Itinerarium septentrionale (1726) by Alexander Gordon. Dorvidilla, in Boece, was fond of hunting dogs, and made laws regulating hunting.
5	Nothatus	233 BC	Nathak (Bellenden)	In legend, killed by Dovallus; a story adopted by Clan Macdowall for their ancestry.
6	Reutherus	213 BC	Reuther (Boece), Rewthar (Bellenden)	Claimed as the eponym of Rutherglen.
7	Reuthra	187 BC	Rewtha (Bellenden)	
8	Thereus	173 BC		
9	Josina	161 BC	Josyne (Bellenden)	
10	Finnanus	137 BC	Fynnane (Bellenden)	
11	Durstus	107 BC		
12	Evenus I	98 BC		
13	Gillus	79 BC		
14	Evenus II	77 BC		
15	Ederus	60 BC		
16	Evenus III	12 BC		
17	Metallanus	5 BC		According to Boece, he received Roman ambassadors.

== Legendary kings (Buchanan), Caratacus to Eugenius I ==
Numbering (Buchanan)	Name	Accession date (Buchanan)	Alternate names	Comments
18	Caractacus	35		
19	Corbredus I	55		
20	Dardannus	72		
21	Corbredus II Galdus	76		
22	Luctacus	110	Lugthacus (Boece)	Boece says some of his crimes must go unmentioned (and then mentions them).
23	Mogaldus	113	Mogallus (Boece)	
24	Conarus	149		
25	Ethodius I	163		
26	Satrael	195	Satrahel (Boece)	
27	Donaldus I	199		Boece makes him the first Christian king.
28	Ethodius II	216		
29	Athirco	231	Athircon, son of Echodius (James Ussher)	
30	Nathalocus	242		A usurper killed by a servant, a story which was the subject of an 1845 poem by James Clerk Maxwell.
31	Findochus	253	Findocus (Boece)	
32	Donaldus II	264		
33	Donaldus III	265		
34	Crathilinthus	277	Crathlinthus (Boece)	
35	Fincormachus	301		
36	Romachus	348		
37	Angusianus	351		
38	Fethelmachus	354	Fethelmacus (Boece)	
39	Eugenius I	357	Evenus I	Thought to have possibly been the same person as Eochaid Muinremuir father of Erc of Dalriada

== Buchanan's Fifth Book, Fergus II to Kenneth II ==
Numbering (Buchanan)	Name	Accession date (Buchanan)	Alternate names	Comments
40	Fergusius II	404	Fergus II, Fergus the Great	See Fergus Mór.
41	Eugenius II	420	Evenus II	
42	Dongardus	452	Domangart	See Domangart Réti.
43	Constantine I	457		Polydore Vergil (Anglica Historia, 1555) gives from here a succession close to Buchanan.
44	Congallus I	479		See Comgall mac Domangairt.
45	Goranus	501	Gabhran Goranus, Conranus (Boece).	See Gabrán mac Domangairt.
46	Eugenius III	535		Father of St Kentigern; see Owain mab Urien.
47	Congallus II	558	Convallus (Boece).	See Conall mac Comgaill.
48	Kinnatellus	569	Kynnatillus (Boece), Cumatillus, Amtillus.	
49	Aidanus	570		See Áedán mac Gabráin
50	Kennethus I	605	Kenneth I Keir (Boece)	See Connad Cerr
51	Eugenius IV	606		See Eochaid Buide.
52	Fearchair I	621	Ferquart	See Ferchar mac Connaid
53	Donaldus IV	632		See Domnall Brecc
54	Ferchardus II	646	Ferquhardus I (Boece), Fearchair Fada.	See Ferchar Fota.
55	Maldvinus	664	Malduinus (Boece)	See Máel Dúin mac Conaill
56	Eugenius V	684		See Eochaid mac Domangairt.
57	Eugenius VI	688		Boece calls him the son of Ferchar
58	Amberkelethus	697	Ambirkelethus (Boece), Ainbhealach, Ambercletus in Polydore Vergil.	See Ainbcellach mac Ferchair.
59	Eugenius VII	699		Likely duplicates Eugenius VI. Also see Eochaid mac Echdach
60	Mordacus	715		See Muiredach mac Ainbcellaig.
61	Etfinus	730	Ethfinus (Boece)	See Áed Find
62	Eugene VIII	761		See Eógan mac Muiredaig.
63	Fergus III	764		See Fergus mac Echdach
64	Solvathius	767	Selvach.	See Selbach mac Ferchair and the legend of Sholto Douglas. Boece calls him the son of Eógan mac Muiredaig
65	Achaius	787		See Eochaid mac Áeda Find. Also supposed to have concluded a treaty with the Emperor Charlemagne
66	Congallus III	819	Convallus II (Boece)	See Conall Crandomna but at a great chronological distance. Boece calls him the cousin Eochaid mac Áeda Find, son of Domhnall brother of Áeda Find.
67	Dongallus	824		Boece calls him the son of Solvathius and that he rejected the offer to cede the kingdom to the Picts and to Alpin, the rightful heir of Achaius, deciding instead to go to gathered his forces at the River Spey, but died. He is also from a collateral line to the Cenel Loairn Mormaers of Moray. Prof Hudon, in 'Kings of Celtic Scotland', has him as the father of Giric.
68	Alpinus	831		See Alpín mac Echdach.
69	Kennethus II	834		See Kenneth MacAlpin.

== Sixth Book, later kings ==
- (73) Grig/Gregory the Great: see Giric
