= Reiter (surname) =

Reiter is a German surname. The surname is relatively frequent in Germany, and in most cases is locational, derived from places called Reit or Reith (with an original meaning of "clearing"). A variant of the same name is Reuter. In some cases the name may also be occupational, derived from Reitherr, the office of treasurer in Upper German towns, or from makers of winnowing sieves (Reiter), or from the term Reiter "horseman, cavalryman, curassier".

People with the surname include:

- Andre Reiter (born 1967), Canadian Painter/Plasterer, Background Actor, Singer
- Charlie Reiter (born 1988), American soccer player
- Dieter Reiter, German politician
- Elizabeth Reiter, American operatic soprano
- Ernst Reiter, German biathlete
- Ester Reiter (born 1941), American-Canadian historian and sociologist
- Hans Reiter (disambiguation), several people
- Jeannot Reiter, Luxembourg footballer
- Jonas Reiter (born 1996), German politician
- Josef Reiter (composer), Austrian composer
- Josef Reiter (judoka) (born 1959), Austrian judoka
- Justin Reiter, American snowboarder
- Ľubomír Reiter, Slovak footballer
- Madelyn Reiter (1942-2020), American politician
- Mario Reiter, Austrian alpine skier
- Mario Reiter (footballer), Austrian footballer
- Michael K. Reiter, American computer scientist
- Michael Reiter (police officer), American security advisor and police chief
- Paul Reiter, medical entomologist
- Philipp Reiter (born 1991), German ski mountaineer and mountain runner
- Raymond Reiter, computer scientist
- Thomas Joseph Reiter (1940-2022), American author and poet
- Thomas Reiter, German astronaut
- William J. Reiter (1889–1979), American assistant director
