= John Johnston (poet) =

Scottish poet

John Johnston (c.1570–1611) was a Scottish poet.

== Life ==
He was born not later than 1570. He styled himself Aberdonensis, i.e. "from Aberdeen". After studying at King's College, Aberdeen, he spent eight years at continental universities, sending home in 1587 from the University of Helmstadt a manuscript copy of George Buchanan's Sphæra, along with two of his own epigrams. At the University of Rostock he formed a lasting friendship with Justus Lipsius.

The influence of Andrew Melville may have helped Johnston to obtain the professorship of divinity at the University of St Andrews, about 1593. His career became closely linked with Melville's. In 1598, when the general assembly of the Scottish church was sitting at Dundee, both were ordered from the town together, because of their opposition to church representation in parliament. In 1603 they jointly appealed with success to Philippe de Mornay against a decision of the synod of Gap on a polemical question. Johnston had been offered the position of second minister in Haddington, East Lothian, but he retained his university chair till his death in October 1611. Johnston's wife, Catharine Melville, and two children predeceased him, and he enshrined their memories in epigrams.

== Works ==
In 1602 Johnston published at Amsterdam Inscriptiones Historicæ Regum Scotorum, continuata annorum serie a Fergusio I. ad Jacobum VI.; præfixus est Gathelus, sive de gentis origine Fragmentum Andreæ Melvini; additæ sunt icones omnium regum nobilis Familiæ Stuartorum. The Inscriptiones are a series of epigrammatic addresses to the Scottish kings from Fergus I to James VI; to the latter the work is dedicated. It was followed by a similar work, Heroes ex omni Historia Scotica lectissimi, Leyden, 1603. Both series are included in Arthur Johnston's Deliciæ Poetarum Scotorum. Johnston's other works were:

- Consolatio Christiana sub Cruce, et Iambi de Felicitate Hominis Deo reconciliati, Leyden, 1609.
- Iambi Sacri, Leyden, 1611.
- Tetrasticha et Lemmata Sacra, item Cantica Sacra, item Icones Regum Judæ et Israelis, Leyden, 1612.

He also wrote an unpublished work on Scottish and English martyrs, and he contributed to William Camden's Britannia epigrams on Scottish towns. Letters of his occur in Camden's correspondence and in Robert Wodrow's Life of Robert Boyd, one of which shows that some of his writings were printed at Saumur.

== Notes ==
Attribution

This article incorporates text from a publication now in the public domain: "Johnston, John (1570?-1611)". Dictionary of National Biography. London: Smith, Elder & Co. 1885–1900.
