= Jacob de Wet II =

Dutch Golden Age painter (1641–1697)

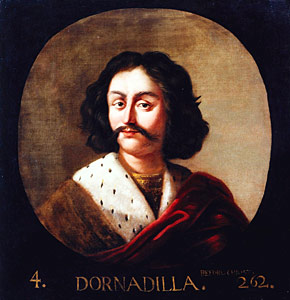
Dornadilla, legendary king of Scotland, fourth in the king list of George Buchanan, 1684-6

Jacob Jacobsz de Wet II (1641, Haarlem – 1697, Amsterdam), also known as James de Witt, was a Dutch Golden Age painter known for a series of 110 portraits of Scottish monarchs, many of them mythical, produced for the Palace of Holyroodhouse, Edinburgh during the reign of Charles II.

== Biography ==
According to the Netherlands Institute for Art History (RKD), he was one of five children of the painter Jacob Willemszoon de Wet. His father taught him to paint and he was first recorded in his father's notebook at age 16 when his father wrote that he sold one of his son's paintings. In 1668 he moved to Amsterdam and married Helena Stalmans, with whom he had five children. In 1673 he secured the patronage of Sir William Bruce, King’s Surveyor and Master of Works in Scotland, and was brought to Edinburgh to work on Charles II's restoration of the Palace of Holyroodhouse. For two years, de Wet painted decorative historical, mythical and allegorical scenes for the newly rebuilt state apartments at Holyrood, whilst also decorating his patron Bruce's house in Balcaskie, Fife.

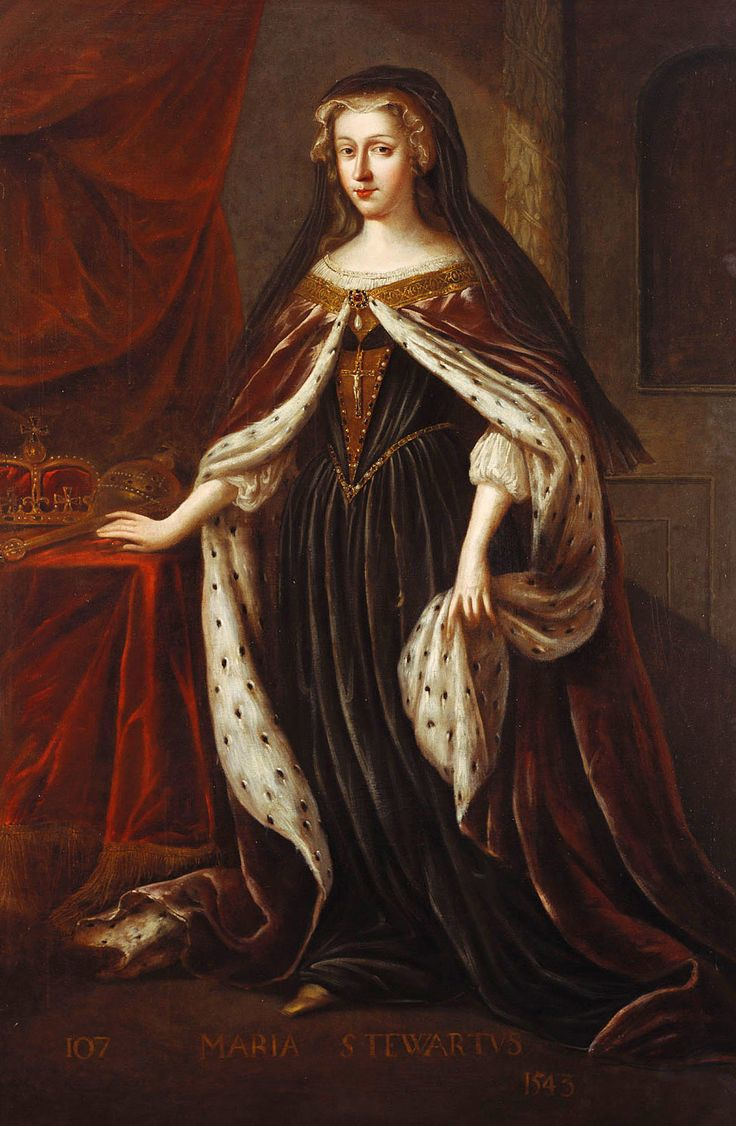
Mary Stewart, Queen of Scots. The only woman in de Wet's Scottish monarchs series for Holyrood Palace.

In 1684 de Wet returned to work at Holyrood and signed a contract with Hugh Wallace, the Royal Cashkeeper, on 26 February which bound him to produce, for £120 per annum and within the period of two years, 110 portraits of Scottish monarchs from the legendary King Fergus to the reigning Charles II. The contract stated that:

The said James de Witte binds and obleidges him to compleately draw, finish, and perfyte The Pictures of the haill Kings who have Reigned over this Kingdome of Scotland, from King Fergus the first King, to KING CHARLES THE SECOND, OUR GRACIOUS SOVERAIGNE who now Reignes Inclusive, being all in number One hundred and ten

For the next two years, de Wet worked in his Canongate studio painting a portrait a week for the royal collection. An earlier series of Scottish royal portraits, painted by George Jamesone for Charles I's Scottish coronation in 1633 and of which 26 currently survive, were sent to Holyrood and used by de Wet as a source for his own portraits. The inscriptions of names and accession dates follow George Buchanan's list of Scottish kings, however the dates are considerably muddled, either by a later restorer or the artist himself. The completed set (a portrait of James VII was also added upon his accession) was hung in the Great Gallery of Holyroodhouse and 97 are still on display today. Eleven of the portraits have disappeared, possibly destroyed by Lieutenant General Henry Hawley’s Dragoons, who were stationed at Holyrood after their defeat by Bonnie Prince Charlie at Falkirk in 1746.

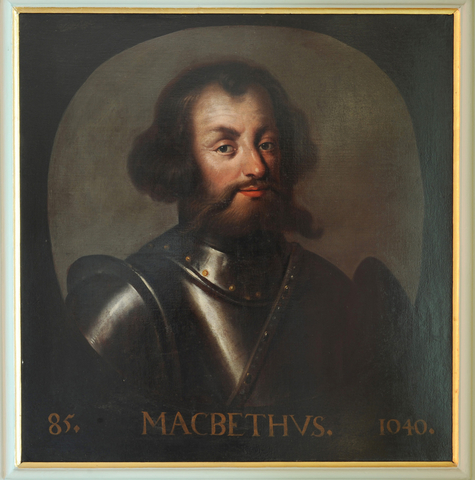
Macbeth, King of Scotland, from de Wet's royal portrait series in Holyrood.

After completing his royal portrait series, and after a further two years in Scotland which included painting 34 scenes from the Life of Christ for Patrick Lyon, 3rd Earl of Strathmore and Kinghorne on the ceiling of the Chapel of Glamis Castle, de Wet again returned to Amsterdam. He is known for religious works done in his father's workshop for the Catholic community of Haarlem, portraits of wealthy Catholics of Amsterdam such as Jan Six, as well as hunting still lifes and landscapes with figures. He died in Amsterdam and was buried there in the Nieuwe Kerk on 16 November 1697. His widow Helena dying in Haarlem on 27 October 1707.
