= Reitter =

Reitter is a German occupational surname, which means a "mounted soldier" or "knight", from the Middle High German ritære ("horseman"). Notable people with the surname include:

- Edmund Reitter (1845–1920), a Moravia-born Austrian-German entomologist, writer, collector, beetle expert
- Edmund Reitter (sculptor) (1904–2005), an Austrian sculptor
- Ferenc Reitter (1813–1874), a Hungarian architect and engineer
- Johann Daniel von Reitter (1759–1811), German forester and botanist
- Brauerei Reitter, a brand of German micro-brew

== See also ==
- Reiter (surnames)
- Reiter
