= Ruether =

Ruether is a surname. Notable people with the surname include:

== People ==
- Dutch Ruether (1893–1970), American baseball player
- Mike Ruether (born 1962), American football player
- Rosemary Radford Ruether (1936–2022), American theologian

== See also ==
- Reuther
