= Fergus I (mythological king) =

Legendary king of Scotland

- Legendary King of Scotland
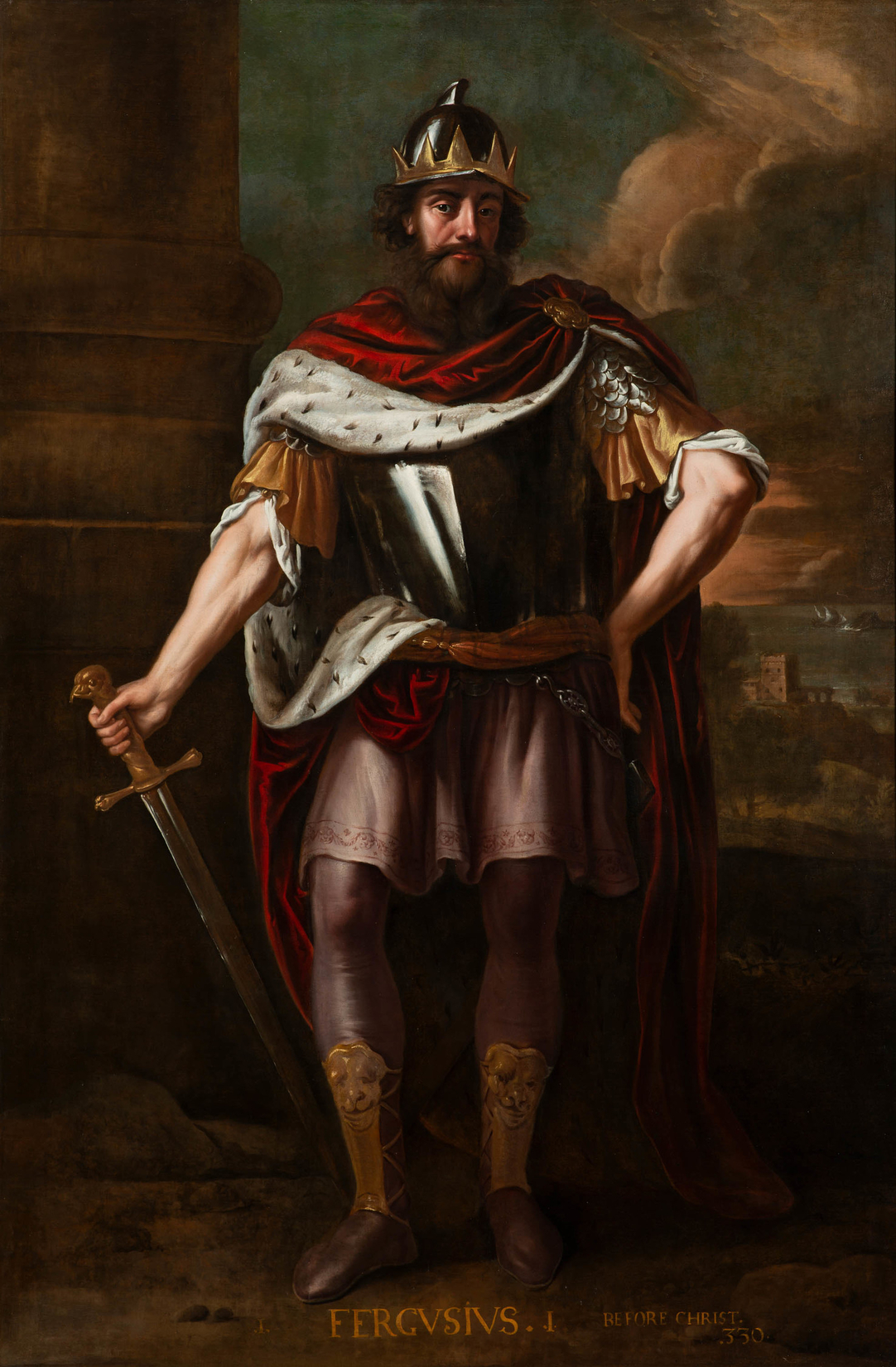
- Fergus depicted in a c. 1685 painting by Jacob de Wet II
- Reign: 330 - 305 BC
- Died: c. 305 BC; Carrickfergus

King Fergus I (fl. c. 330 B.C.), is generally identified as the son of Ferchard, Prince of Scots in Ireland and is the first of the line of Legendary kings of Scotland.

The "first king of Scotland", according to the fictitious chronologies of Boece and Buchanan, is said to have come to Scotland from Ireland about 330 B.C. to assist the Scots already settled in Scotland against the joint attack of the Picts and Britons. After succeeding in this he is further said to have gone back to Ireland to quell disturbances which had arisen in his absence, and to have been drowned in the passage off the port which got the name of Carrickfergus from him. According to Fordoun, Wyntoun, and most of the earlier genealogical lists of Scottish kings, the same account is given of the settlement of the Scots from Ireland by a King Fergus, son of Ferchard. According to others of the lists, Ferchard or Feardach, the father of Fergus, was the first and Fergus the second king. There follows a series of thirty-nine or forty-five kings between Fergus I and Fergus II, son of Earc. The critical insight of Father Innes demolished these fabulous lists of kings, and put the chronology of Scottish history on a sound foundation, by his proof that Fergus II, son of Earc, who came to Scotland about the end of the fifth century A.D., was in reality the first Dál Riata king in Scotland. Innes's results have been adopted by subsequent historians.

The invention and persistent acceptance during so many centuries, from the twelfth to the eighteenth, of a fabulous series of kings is, though not unparalleled, a singular specimen of the genealogical myth which flatters the vanity of nations as of families. It is supposed to have been due to the desire to establish a higher antiquity for the Scottish peoplehood, royal line, and church, than could be claimed for the Irish or English. It is of course not inconsistent with the rectified chronology of Innes that even prior to 503 A.D. there may have been Celts of the Scottic culture settled in Scotland. Scots had aided the Picts in opposing the Romans in the fourth century, and Bede evidently inclines to an earlier date for the Scottish settlement. All that can be safely said is that there is no proof of any Dál Riata kingdom till the commencement of the sixth century, and that the account given by Boece and Buchanan of Fergus, the son of Ferchard, and his successors, is as devoid of historical foundation as the statement that "his coming into Albion was at the time when Alexander the Great took Babylon, about 330 years before the birth of Christ".

Buchanan, from whom this sentence is quoted, attempts to save his own credit by prefixing the words "historians say that", but by adopting it he became himself one of these historians, and gave the fabulous narrative a prolonged existence. Father Innes presses somewhat hardly on Boece, for the origin of this narrative dates back at least as early as the twelfth century, but the special blame undoubtedly attaches to Boece and still more to Buchanan that they clothed the dry list of names with characters, and invented events or incidents which gave the narrative more of the semblance of history.

A portrait of Fergus I by Dutch painter Jacob de Wet II, who painted many mythical Scottish kings, hangs in the Great Gallery of Holyrood Palace. An engraving of Fergus and his genealogy is housed in the National Portrait Gallery, London.

== See also ==
- Goídel Glas
