= King's Gallery, Edinburgh =

Royal art gallery in Edinburgh

Coordinates: 55.9526°N 3.1739°W

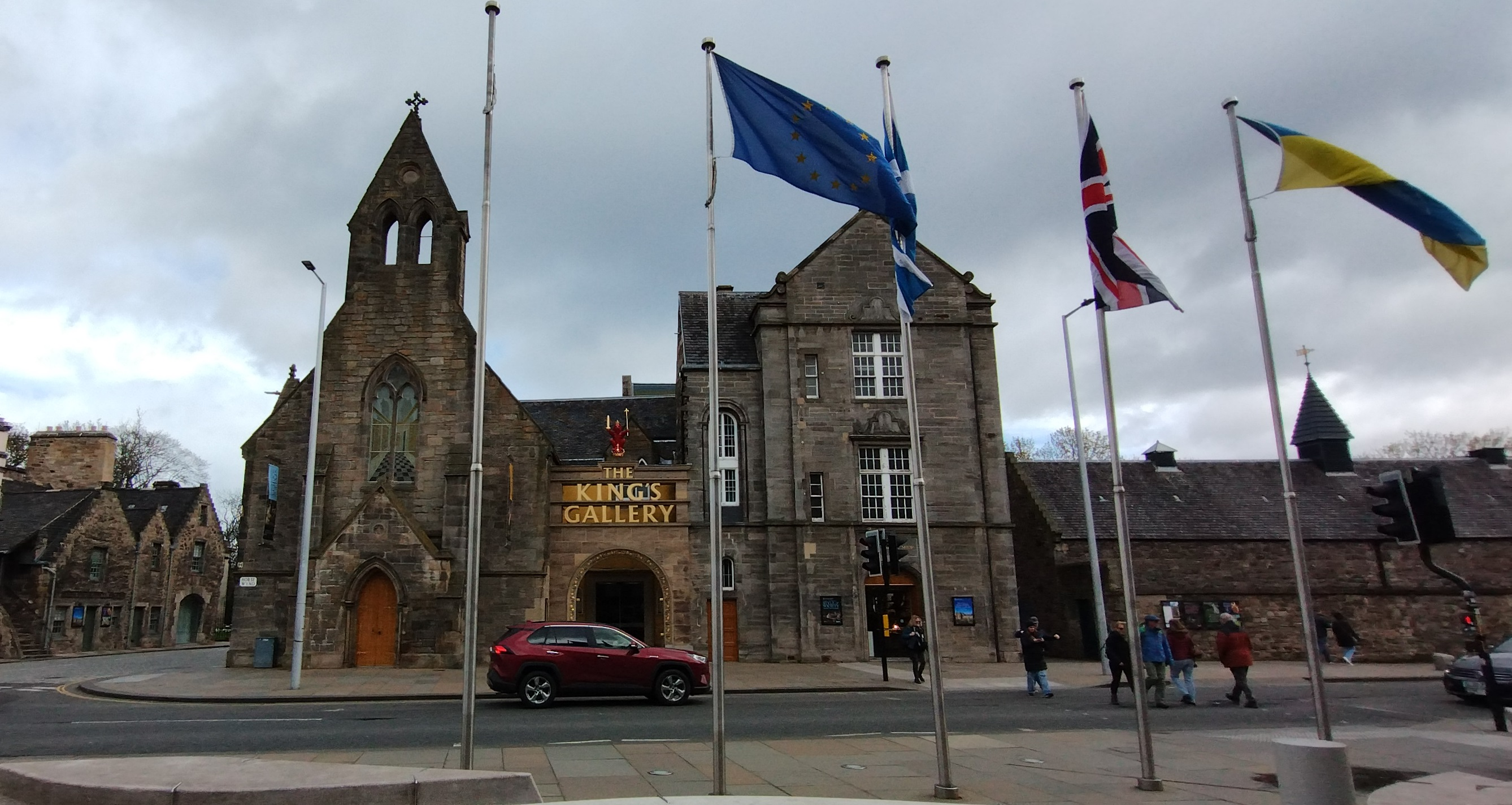
King's Gallery, Edinburgh

The King's Gallery, previously known as the Queen's Gallery, is an art gallery in Edinburgh, Scotland. It forms part of the Palace of Holyroodhouse complex. It was opened in 2002 by Queen Elizabeth II, and exhibits works from the Royal Collection.

It is open to the public daily. The building is Category B listed.

== History ==
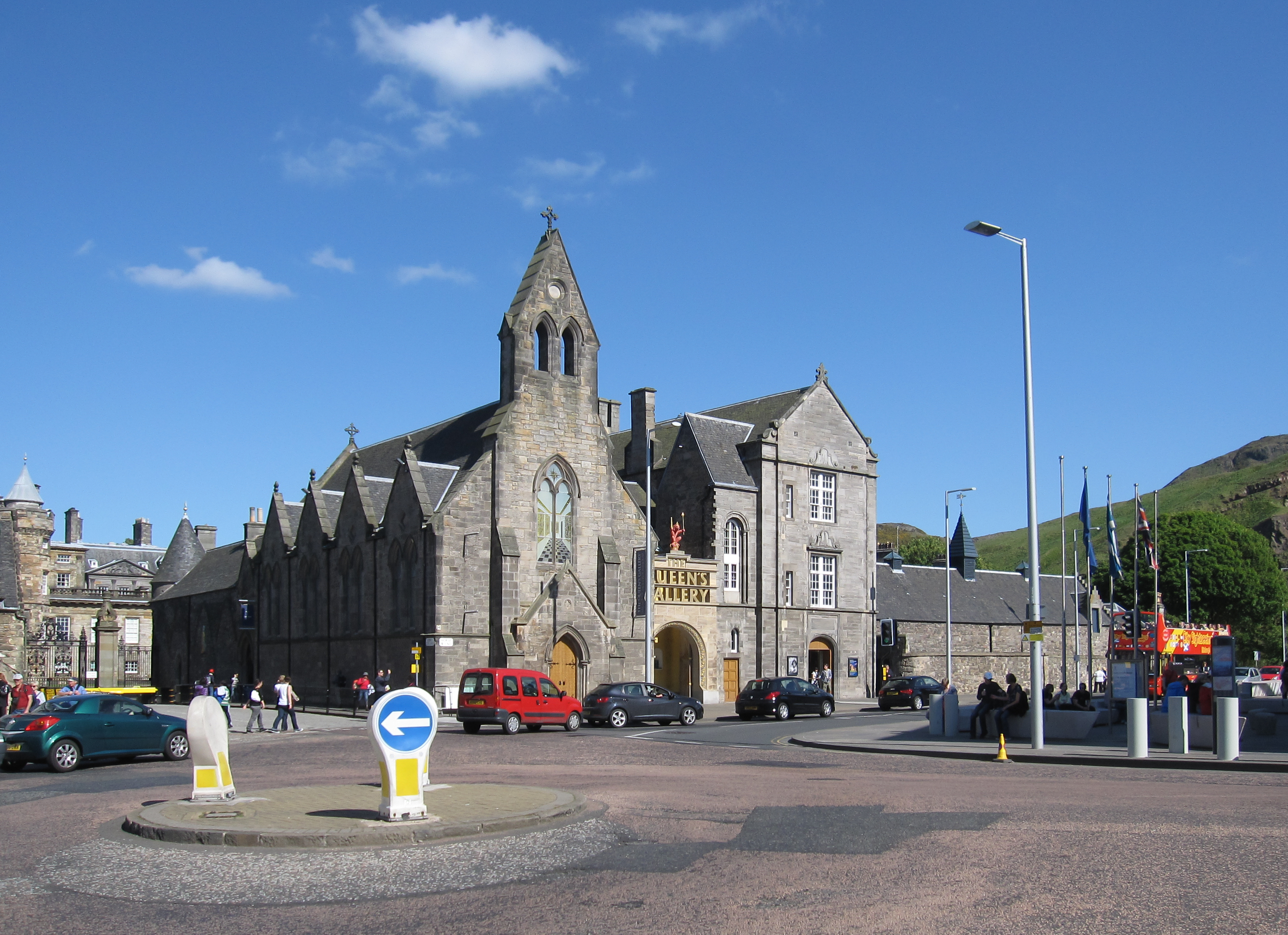
Queen's Gallery, Edinburgh (2011)

The King's Gallery is housed primarily in a Gothic building that was originally built between 1846 and 1850 as Holyrood Free Church, a parish church of the Free Church of Scotland then, from 1900, of the United Free Church of Scotland). The church was last used for worship in 1915, when it became a redundant church. Prior to its conversion to a gallery, the church building was used as a storeroom. The Gallery also comprises the neo-Jacobean building that housed the former Free Church School, which was built at the same time as the church. The building of the church and the school was funded by Elizabeth Gordon, Duchess of Gordon, who was an early supporter of the Free Church. The former school was converted into accommodation for the palace's chauffeurs in the 1920s. In 2002, the buildings were converted to form what is now the King's Gallery under plans by Benjamin Tindall Architects. The gallery is primarily housed on the first floor in a large space with an open timber roof.

In 2019, the former Scottish National Party MP George Kerevan claimed that, if Scotland gained Independence, the gallery building would be demolished to create an uninterrupted "Freedom square" between Holyrood Palace and the Scottish Parliament Building.

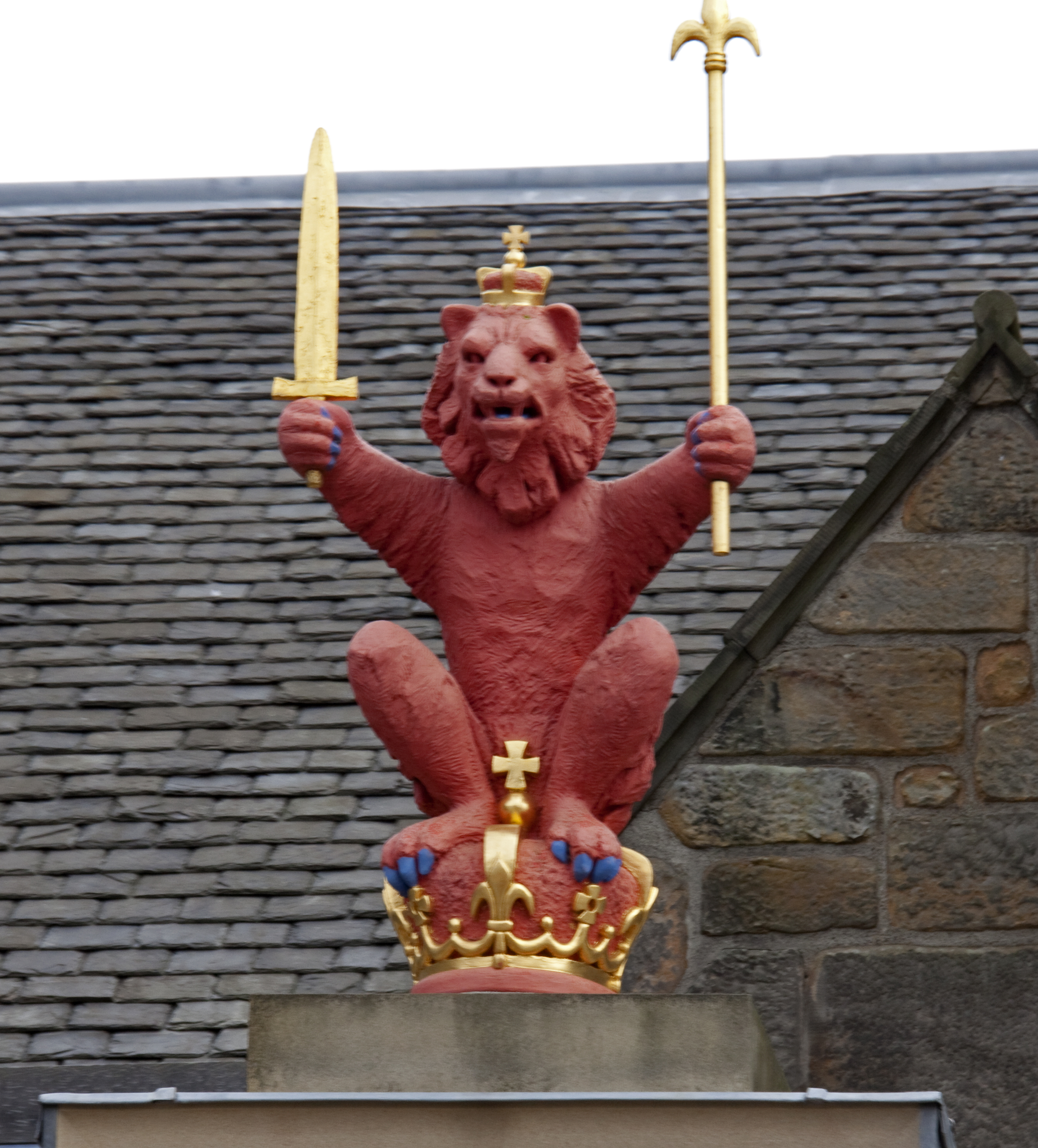
Scotland's heraldic lion above the entrance of the King's Gallery

== Exhibitions ==
The gallery houses temporary exhibitions throughout the year which are drawn from the Royal Collection.

Current exhibition: The Edwardians: The Age of Elegance - running from the 24th April 2026 to the 6th December 2026.

Past exhibitions have included:

- 17th October 2025 - 8th March 2026 - Drawing the Italian Renaissance.
- 2022 – Masterpieces from Buckingham Palace, including paintings by Sir Anthony van Dyck, Rembrandt and Peter Paul Rubens.
- 2021 – Watercolour paintings from the personal collections of Queen Victoria and Prince Albert.
- 2019/2020 – Drawings by Leonardo da Vinci. The exhibition was the largest collection of works by Leonardo assembled in Scotland to date.
- 2019 – Russian art, including photographs, objects and paintings.

== See also ==
- King's Gallery at Buckingham Palace
