= Thomas Joseph Reiter =

American poet and academic

Thomas J. Reiter
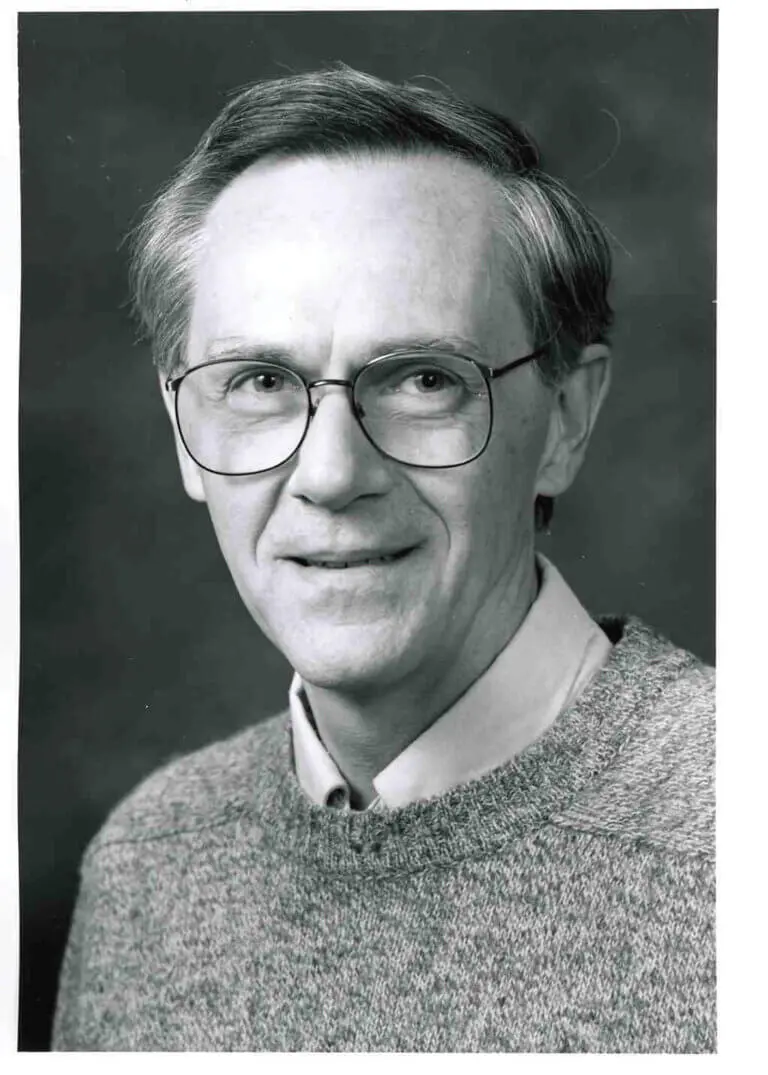
- Born: March 7, 1940; Dubuque, Iowa
- Died: April 24, 2022 (aged 82); Neptune, New Jersey
- Education: Loras College, BA University of Virginia, MA University of Massachusetts, Ph.D.
- Occupation: Poet/Author/Scholar
- Notable work: Pearly Everlasting
- Spouse(s): JoNell Reed, m 1965
- Children: 2

Thomas Joseph Reiter (March 7, 1940 – April 24, 2022) was an American poet, author, scholar, critic and lecturer. At the time of his death, he was emeritus professor of humanities at Monmouth University, where he had been a professor of English and the Wayne D. McMurray Endowed Chair of the Humanities. Reiter was the author of ten collections of poetry.

== Early life and education ==
Reiter was born on March 7, 1940, in Dubuque, Iowa. He was the third and final child of Gilbert Reiter and Alice (Miller) Reiter. Gilbert was of German ancestry and Alice was of German and French ancestry, her grandparents having emigrated from Alsace Lorraine.

Reiter attended Loras Academy (Dubuque, IA) from which he graduated in 1958. He went on to receive a Bachelors of Arts in English Literature (Magna Cum Laude) from Loras College (Dubuque, IA) in 1962, a Master of Arts in English Literature from the University of Virginia in 1962 on a Woodrow Wilson Fellowship, and a Ph.D. from the University of Massachusetts in 1970, where he wrote his dissertation on poet Glenway Wescott.

== Adult life and career ==
Reiter was an instructor of English at Siena College (NY) from 1963-1966.

In 1968, he joined the faculty of the English department of Monmouth University, and was eventually promoted to associate and then full professor. He also served as Monmouth's poet in residence.

In 1985, Reiter was appointed the Wayne D. McMurray Chair of the Humanities, making him the first recipient of an endowed chair in Monmouth University history. He served in that position until his retirement in 2005.

Reiter is the author of ten collections of narrative and lyric poems, whose settings were a wide variety of locales such as the Midwest, the prairie, the Mississippi River, the Pine Barrens, and the Caribbean. Reiter's poetic signature and trademark is his vast knowledge of botany, and poet Brendan Galvin referred to him as "probably the finest poet-botanizer since Robert Frost."

Reiter served as the editor of the Cimarron Review.

Reiter retired in 2005 and died on April 24, 2022, at his home in Neptune, New Jersey.

== Published works ==
Reiter is the author of a number of books, and he also frequently contributed to anthologies and magazines. In 2000, his eighth collection of poetry, Pearly Everlasting, was submitted by Louisiana State University Press for the 2001 Pulitzer Prize in Original Verse.

- River Route. Cedar Creek Press. 1977
- The Zelenka Poems. 1981.
- Starting from Bloodroot 1982.
- Rain Poems and Rain Drawings, 1985
- Time in the Air, 1990
- Crossovers. Cheney, Washington: Eastern Washington University Press, 1995
- Prairie of the Universe, 1996
- Pearly Everlasting. Baton Rouge: Louisiana State University Press, 2000
- Powers and Boundaries. Baton Rouge: Louisiana State University Press, 2004
- Catchment. Baton Rouge: Louisiana State University Press, 2009

=== Contributions to anthologies ===
- Heart of the Order: Baseball Poems, 2014.
- The Poets of New Jersey: From Colonial to Contemporary, 2005
- Anthology of Magazine Verse & Yearbook of American Poetry, 1997
- The Great Machines: Poems and Songs of the American Railroad, 1996
- Under a Gull's Wings: Poems and Photographs of the Jersey Shore, 1996
- Sweet Nothings: An Anthology of Rock and Roll in American Poetry, 1994
- A Good Man: Fathers and Sons in Poetry and Prose, 1993
- 80 and the 80s: A Decade's History in Verse, 1990
- Wetting our Lines Together: An Anthology of Recent North American Fishing Poems, 1982
- The Diamond Anthology, The Poetry Society of America, 1971

== Fellowships and awards ==
Reiter received a number of fellowships, which enabled travel to places that served as the source of some of his writing.

- Creative Writing Fellowship, National Endowment for the Arts, 2003
- Poetry Fellowship, New Jersey State Council on the Arts, 1981, 1985, 1990, 1995, 2003
- Woodrow Wilson Foundation, 1962
- The James Boatwright Poetry Prize, Shenandoah Magazine, 2017
- Emeritus Professor of Humanities at Monmouth University, 2005
- The Appalachia Poetry Prize, 1993
- The Wayne D. McMurray Endowed Chair of the Humanities at Monmouth University, 1985-2005.
- The Academy of American Poets Prize, University of Virginia, 1963
- The Daily News Poetry Prize, The Caribbean Writer, 1990
