= Reuter =

Reuter or Reutter is a surname. Notable people with the surname include:

== Reuter ==
- Christian Reuter (1665– c. 1712), writer
- Edzard Reuter (1928–2024), Daimler-Benz manager
- Émile Reuter (1874–1973), Luxembourgian politician
- Enzio Reuter (1867–1951), entomologist
- Ernst Reuter (1889–1953), mayor of Berlin
- Fritz Reuter (1810–1874), poet
- Gabriele Reuter (1859–1941), writer
- George François Reuter (1805–1872), French botanist
- Irving Jacob Reuter (1885–1972), president of Oldsmobile, philanthropist
- James B. Reuter (1916–2012), Jesuit priest
- Ludwig von Reuter (1869–1943), admiral
- Manuel Reuter (born 1961), race driver
- Milly Reuter (1904–1976), athlete
- Odo Morannal Reuter (1850–1913), Finnish zoologist and poet
- Otto Sigfrid Reuter (1876–1945), German writer and neopagan organiser
- Paul Reuter (1816–1899), founder of Reuters news agency
- Peter Reuter (born 1944), American criminologist
- Renan Soares Reuter (born 1990), Brazilian footballer
- Renee Reuter, American politician
- Stefan Reuter (born 1966), football (soccer) player
- Timothy Reuter (1947–2002), German-British historian
- Walter Reuter (1906–2005), photographer and resistance fighter
- Willem Reuter (c. 1642–1681), Flemish painter

== Reutter ==
- Georg Reutter II, (1708–1772), Austrian composer
- Hermann Reutter (1900–1985), German composer and pianist
- Katherine Reutter (born 1988), American short track skater
- Otto Reutter (1870–1931), comedian
- Wilhelm Reutter, founder of Reutter Carosserie-Werke in Stuttgart, now Porsche and Recaro seats

== Other uses ==
- Reuters, international news agency founded by Reuter
- Reuter Organ Company

== See also ==
- Reuther (surname)
- Reiter (surname)
