= Eógan mac Muiredaig =

Supposed king of Dál Riata

Eógan mac Muiredaig is named in some Scots sources as a king of Dál Riata, probably in the 730s.

Presumed to be the son of Muiredach mac Ainbcellaig, and thus a king of the Cenél Loairn, Eógan is not named in any surviving Irish annals, nor does he appear in the Duan Albanach, which passes from Muiredach to Áed Find. The Chronicle of the Kings of Dál Riata names Eógan son of Muiredach as king after Muiredach, and the king-list in the Chronicle of Melrose includes him.

Later genealogies of the Mormaers of Moray trace their descent from the Cenél Loairn through one Ruadrí, a presumed brother of Eógan's father.

Eógan's reign falls in the period when Dál Riata was invaded and conquered by the Picts under Óengus mac Fergusa. The name of his successor is unknown, and the next king to appear in the record is Áed Find of the Cenél nGabráin, some three decades after Eógan's time.

Regnal titles
Preceded by Muiredach mac Ainbcellaig	King of Dál Riata; 730s	Unknown
