= Hans Reiter =

Hans Reiter may refer to

- Hans Reiter (physician) (1881–1969), German Nazi physician, head of the German Office of Public Health from 1933 to 1945
- Hans J. Reiter (1921–1992), Austrian mathematician
- Hans Reiter (sailor), competed in the Tornado sailing race at the 1988 Summer Olympics
