= Reiter, Washington =

Unincorporated community in Washington, United States

- Unincorporated community
- Location within Washington (state) Location within the United States
- Coordinates: 47°50′28″N 121°37′51″W
- Country: United States
- State: Washington
- County: Snohomish
- Time zone: UTC-8 (Pacific (PST))
  - Summer (DST): UTC-7 (PDT)

Reiter is an unincorporated community in Snohomish County, in the U.S. state of Washington.

== History ==
A post office called Reiter was established in 1906, and remained in operation until 1918. The community was named after Charles G. Reiter, a businessperson in the mining industry.
