= Holyrood Palace =

Official Scottish residence of the British monarch

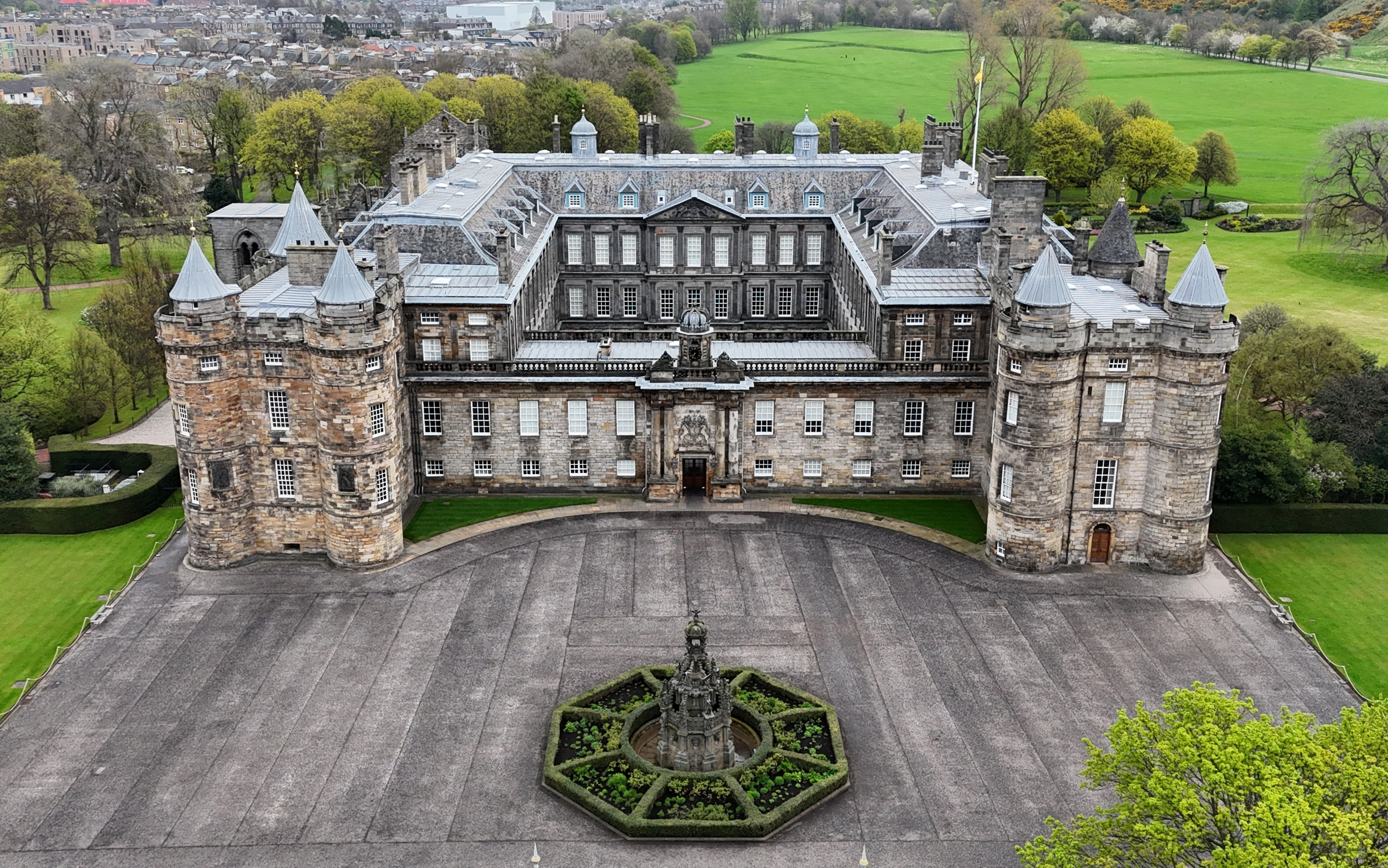
- Aerial view of Holyrood Palace in 2025

- Location within Edinburgh Location within Scotland

General information
- Type: Official residence
- Architectural style: Classical
- Location: Royal Mile, Edinburgh, Scotland
- Coordinates: 55°57′09″N 3°10′21″W
- Construction started: 1671 (north-west tower, 1528)
- Completed: 1678 (north-west tower, 1536)
- Owner: King Charles III in right of the Crown

Listed Building – Category A
- Official name: Holyroodhouse, Palace of Holyroodhouse Including Gates, Gatepiers, Boundary Walls and Railings
- Designated: 13 December 1970
- Reference no.: LB28022

Inventory of Gardens and Designed Landscapes in Scotland
- Official name: Palace of Holyroodhouse
- Designated: 30 June 1987
- Reference no.: GDL00308

The Palace of Holyroodhouse (/ˈhɒlɪruːd/ or /ˈhoʊlɪruːd/), also known as Holyrood Palace, is the official residence of the monarch of the United Kingdom in Scotland. Located at the bottom of the Royal Mile in Edinburgh, at the opposite end to Edinburgh Castle, Holyrood has served as the principal royal residence in Scotland since the 16th century, and is a setting for state occasions and official entertaining.

The palace adjoins Holyrood Abbey, and the gardens are set within Holyrood Park. The King's Gallery was converted from existing buildings at the western entrance to the palace and was opened in 2002 to exhibit works of art from the Royal Collection.

King Charles III spends one week in residence at Holyrood at the beginning of summer, where he carries out a range of official engagements and ceremonies. The 16th-century historic apartments of Mary, Queen of Scots, and the State Apartments, used for official and state entertaining, are open to the public throughout the year, except when members of the royal family are in residence. The palace also serves as the official residence of the Lord High Commissioner to the General Assembly of the Church of Scotland during the annual meeting of the General Assembly.

== History ==
=== 12th–15th centuries ===
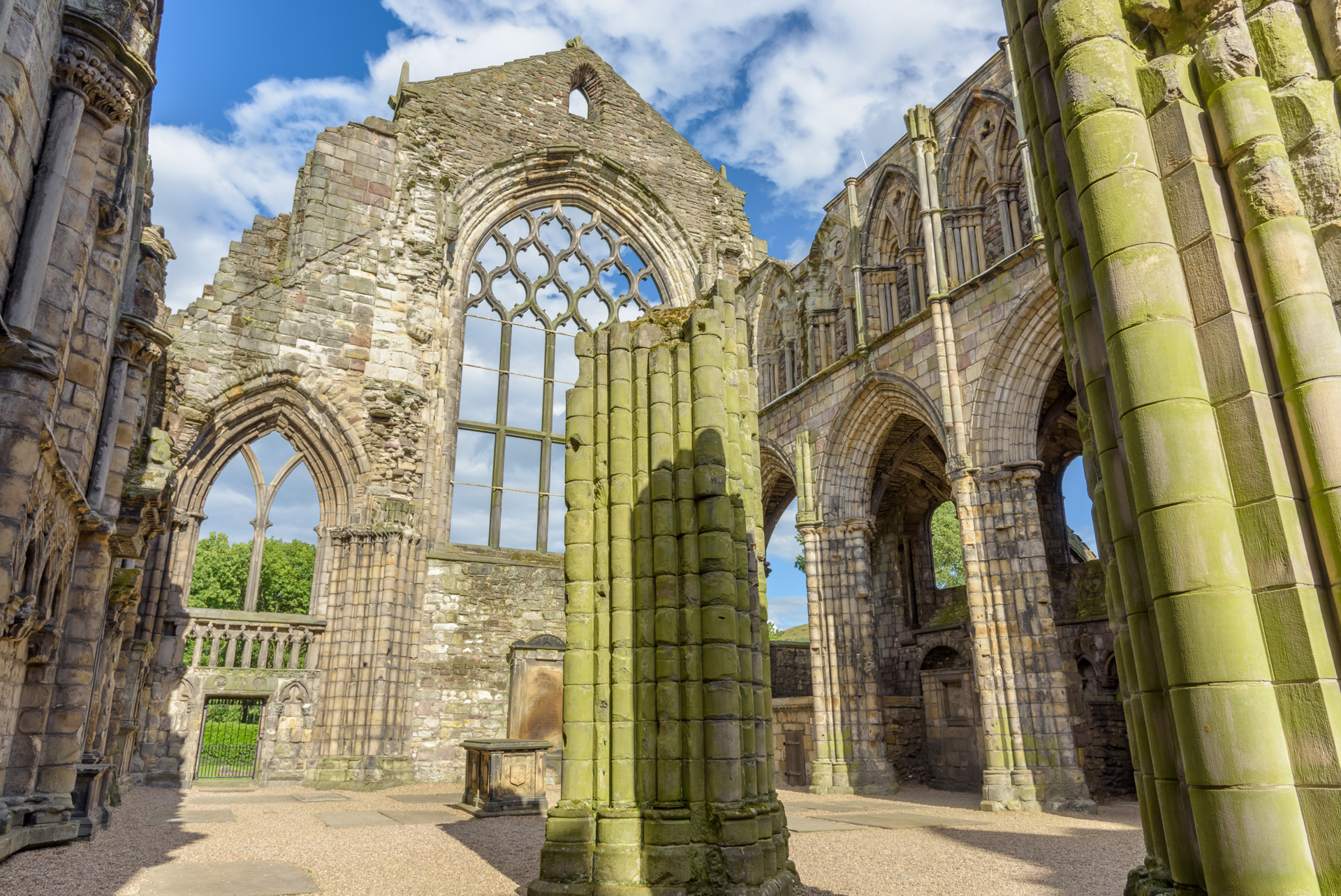
The ruined nave of Holyrood Abbey

The ruined Augustinian Holyrood Abbey that stands next to the palace was founded in 1128 on the orders of King David I. The name derives either from a legendary vision of the cross witnessed by David I, or from a relic of the True Cross known as the Holy Rood or Black Rood, which had belonged to Saint Margaret, David's mother. As a royal foundation, and sited close to Edinburgh Castle, it became an important administrative centre. A Papal legate was received here in 1177, while in 1189 a council of nobles met to discuss a ransom for the captive William the Lion. The Parliament of Scotland met at the abbey seven times between 1256 and 1410, and in 1328 the Treaty of Edinburgh–Northampton was signed by Robert the Bruce in the 'King's Chamber' at the abbey, indicating that it may already have been in use as a royal residence. In 1371, David II became the first of several kings to be buried at Holyrood Abbey, and James II was born, crowned, married, and buried there. James III and Margaret of Denmark were married at Holyrood in 1469. The early royal residence was in the abbey guesthouse, and by the later 15th century the king occupied dedicated royal lodgings.

=== 16th century ===
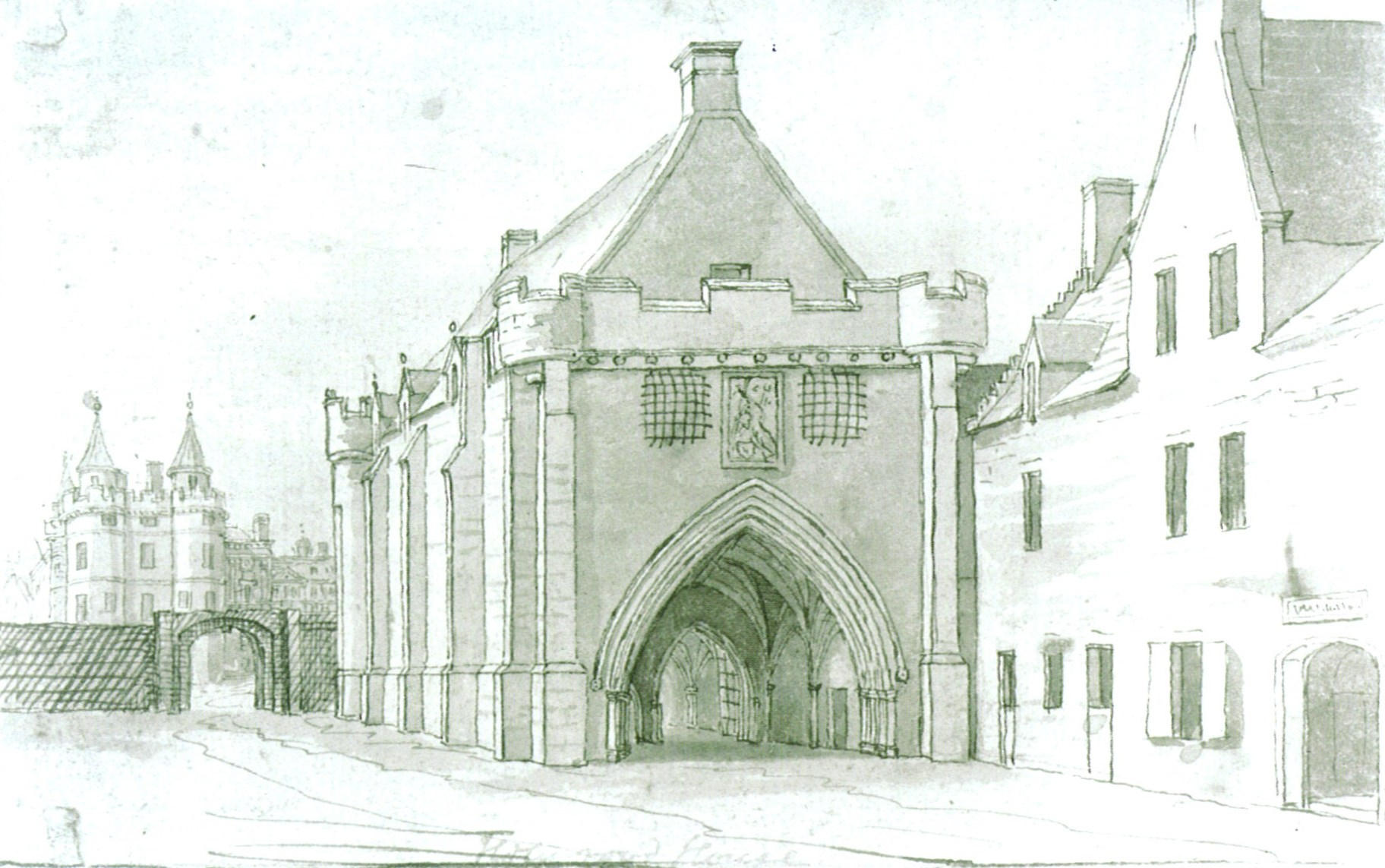
The gatehouse built by James IV, with the palace's James V's Tower behind, in a 1746 drawing by Thomas Sandby.

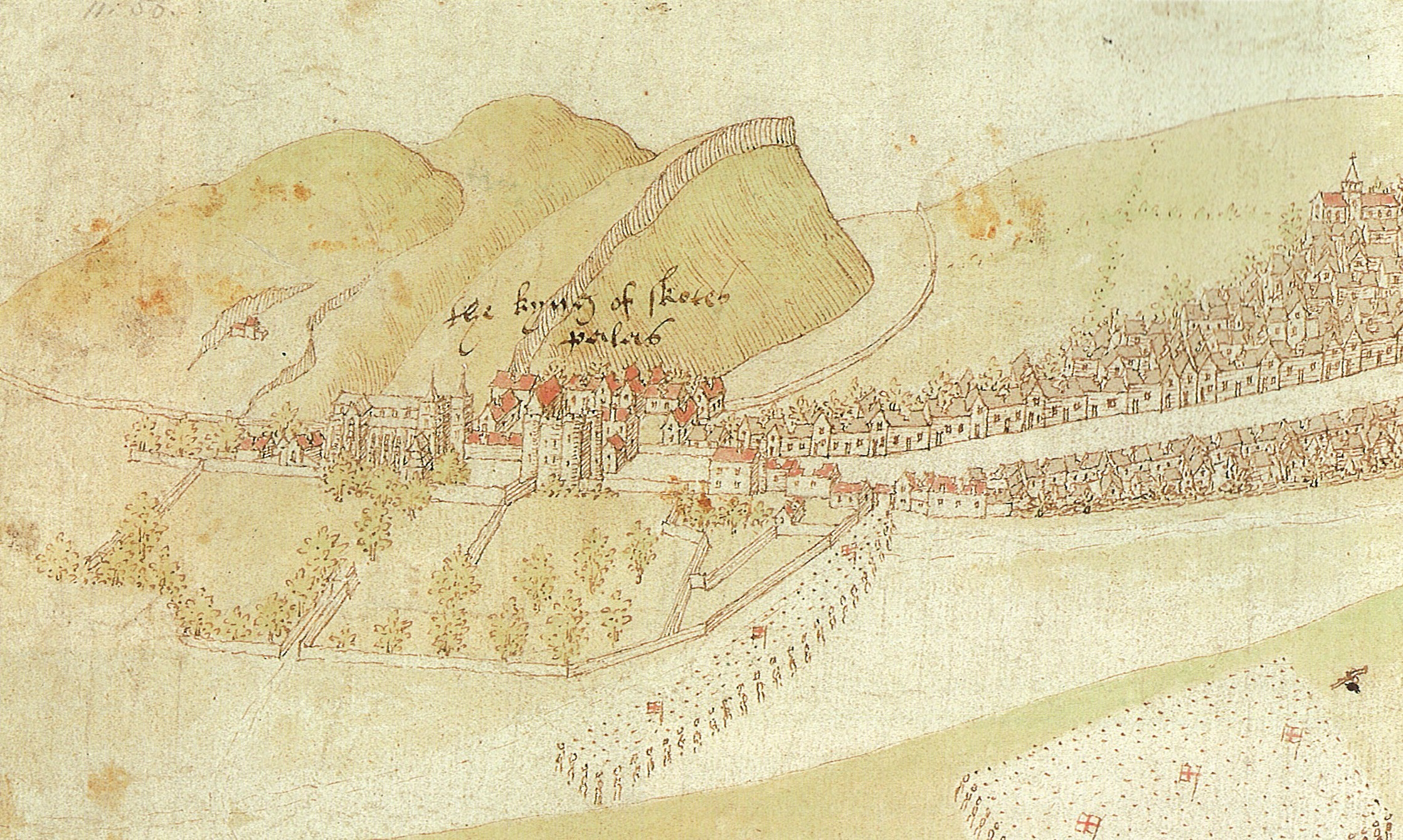
Detail of a sketch made by an English soldier in 1544, showing the palace and abbey in front of Arthur's Seat. The Royal Mile is at right.

Between 1501 and 1505, James IV constructed a Gothic palace adjacent to the abbey. The impetus for the work probably came from the marriage of James IV to Margaret Tudor, which took place in the abbey in August 1503 while work was still ongoing. The palace was built around a quadrangle, situated west of the abbey cloister. It contained a chapel, gallery, royal apartments, and a great hall. The chapel occupied the north range of the quadrangle, with the queen's apartments occupying part of the south range. The west range contained the king's lodgings and the entrance to the palace. The master mason Walter Merlioun built a two-storey gatehouse, which was demolished in 1753, although fragments of it remain in the 19th-century Abbey Court House which stands on Abbey Strand. The upper floor of the gatehouse was a workshop for the glazier Thomas Peebles until 1537, when it was converted into a space for mending the royal tapestries. In 1512 a lion house and menagerie were constructed in the palace gardens to house the king's lion, civet, tigers, lynx, and bears. James IV held tournaments of the Wild Knight and the Black Lady in Edinburgh in 1507 and 1508. These events concluded with banquets in the great hall. As the final act of these theatrical events, the Black Lady came into the hall with her Spanish page "Little Martin". A cloud descended from the roof and swept them both away.

James V added to the palace between 1528 and 1536, beginning with the present James V's Tower, which is the oldest surviving part of the palace. This huge rectangular tower, rounded at the corners, provided new royal lodgings at the north-west corner of the palace. Originally equipped with a drawbridge leading to the main entrance (protected with a yett) on the first floor, it may also have been protected by a moat, and provided a high degree of security. The south range was remodelled, and the old queen's apartments were converted into a new chapel, and the former chapel in the north range was converted into the Council Chamber, where ceremonial events normally took place. James IV's west range was demolished and a new west range in the Renaissance style was built to house new state rooms, including the royal library. The symmetrical composition of the west range suggested that a second tower at the south-west was planned, though this was never executed at the time. Around a series of lesser courts were ranged the Governor's Tower, the armoury, the mint, a forge, kitchens, and other service quarters. James V's first wife, Madeleine of Valois, died at Holyrood in 1537.

The English armies of the Earl of Hertford sacked Edinburgh and caused extensive damage to the palace and the abbey in 1544 and 1547 during the War of the Rough Wooing. Repairs were made by Mary of Guise, and in May 1559 she had a new altarpiece installed in the chapel royal, featuring paintings from Flanders set in a frame made by a French carpenter Andrew Mansioun. The altars were destroyed by a Protestant mob later in the same year, and after the Scottish Reformation was formalised, the abbey buildings were neglected. The choir and transepts of the abbey church were pulled down in 1570. The nave was retained as the parish church of the Canongate. The royal apartments in James V's Tower were occupied by Mary, Queen of Scots from her return to Scotland in 1561 to her forced abdication in 1567. The palace was heated with coal from Wallyford in East Lothian. The queen had archery butts erected in the south gardens to allow her to practise, and she hunted deer in Holyrood Park. There was also a flock of sheep in the park which were managed for the queen by the keeper, John Huntar. Some of her French servants formed relationships with women in the Canongate. The Kirk authorities disapproved and made five of these unmarried women stand with bared heads at the cross near the palace for three hours in December 1564. The series of famous audiences Mary gave to John Knox took place in her audience chamber at Holyrood, and she married her second husband, Henry Stewart, Lord Darnley, in her private chapel in July 1565. It was in the royal apartments that Mary witnessed the murder of David Rizzio, her private secretary, on 9 March 1566. Darnley and several nobles entered the queen's apartments via the private stair from Darnley's own apartments below. Bursting in on the queen, Rizzio and four other courtiers, who were at supper, they dragged Rizzio through the bedchamber and into the outer chamber, where he was stabbed to death, allegedly receiving fifty-seven dagger wounds. Mary married her third husband, James Hepburn, 4th Earl of Bothwell, at the palace in May 1567.

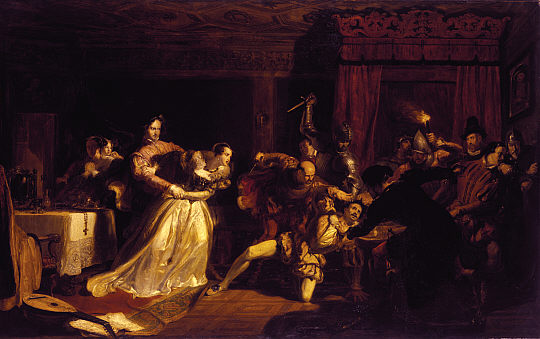
The Murder of David Rizzio, painted in 1833 by William Allan

During the subsequent Marian civil war, on 25 July 1571, William Kirkcaldy of Grange bombarded the king's men garrisoned inside the palace with cannon positioned in the Black Friar Yard, near the Pleasance. Parliament met in the Palace on 30 April 1573. James VI took up residence at Holyrood in 1579 when he began his personal rule. The palace was refurbished by William MacDowall with a new north gallery painted by Walter Binning, and an apartment for the king's favourite, Esmé Stewart. The coronation of James's queen, Anne of Denmark, took place in Holyrood Abbey in 1590, at which time the royal household at the palace numbered around 600 persons.

James VI kept a menagerie of animals at Holyrood including a lion, a tiger, and a lynx. The palace was not however secure enough to prevent the king and queen being surprised in their lodgings during two raids in December 1591 and July 1593 by Francis Stewart, 5th Earl of Bothwell, a nobleman implicated by the North Berwick Witch Trials. Three of James VI's children, Elizabeth, Margaret, and Charles, were baptised in the chapel royal. The Parliament of Scotland met at Holyrood on 29 occasions between 1573 and 1630.

=== 17th century ===
James VI was in residence at Holyrood on 26 March 1603 when Sir Robert Carey arrived at the palace to inform the King of Scots that Elizabeth I had died two days earlier, and that James was now King of England and Ireland. With James's accession to the English throne and his move south to reside in London, the palace was no longer the seat of a permanent royal court. James visited in 1617, and the Chapel Royal was redecorated for the occasion. The west front was remodelled in 1633 in preparation for the coronation of Charles I at Holyrood Abbey, and Charles resided at the palace again from August to November 1641. In 1646 he conferred on James Hamilton, 1st Duke of Hamilton and his descendants the office of Hereditary Keeper of the palace. In November 1650, the palace was damaged extensively by fire while it was occupied by Oliver Cromwell's troops. After this, much of the palace was abandoned.

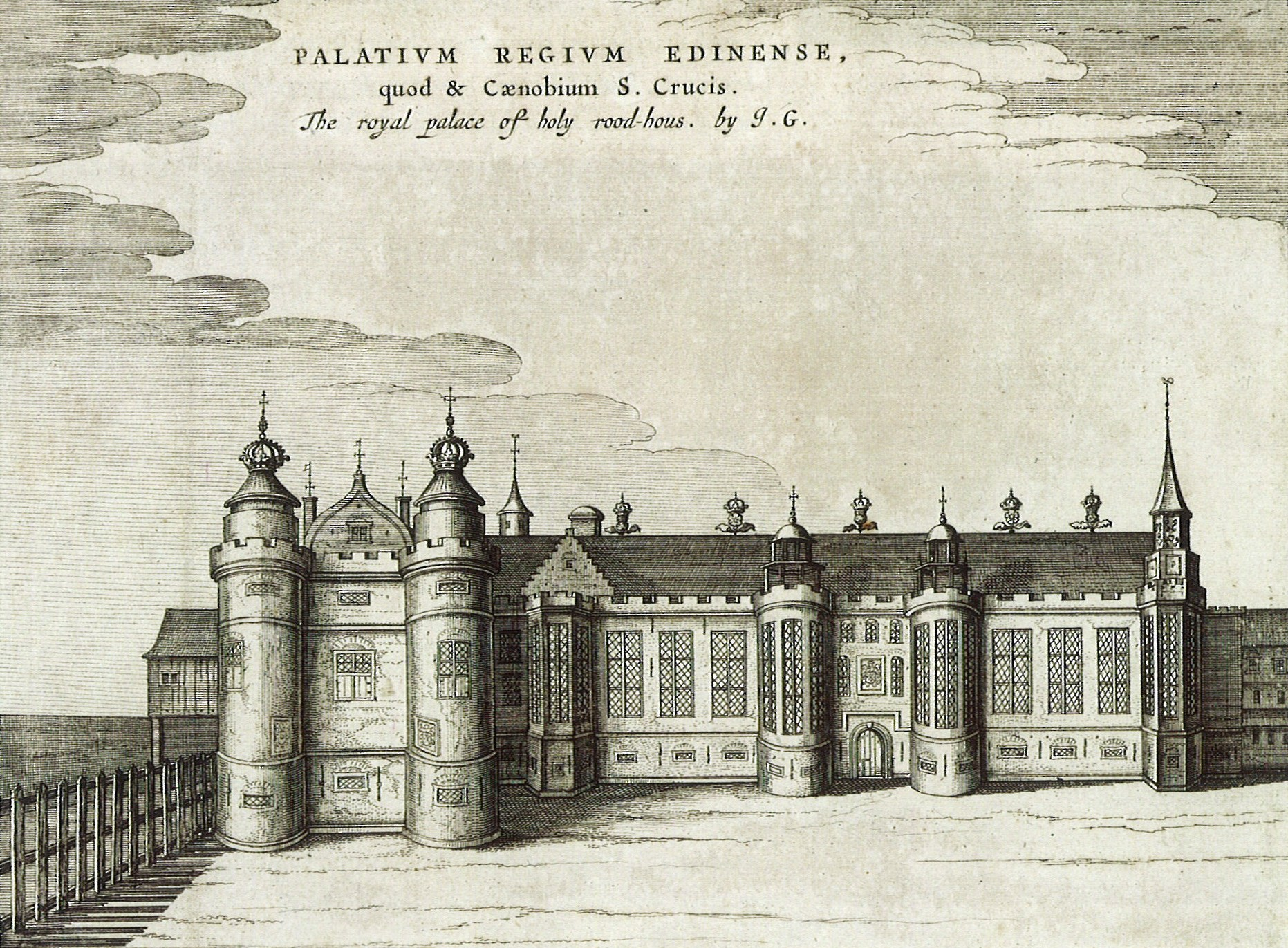
The west range of the palace drawn around 1649 by James Gordon of Rothiemay, prior to reconstruction in the 1670s

Following the restoration of Charles II in 1660, Holyrood once again became a royal palace and the meeting place of the reconstituted Privy Council. Repairs were put in hand to allow use of the palace by the Earl of Lauderdale, the Secretary of State, and a full survey was carried out in 1663 by John Mylne. In 1670, the Privy Council decided to almost completely rebuild the palace. Apart from Holyrood and Windsor Castle, Charles II failed to complete any of his palace modernisation schemes, largely due to lack of money. The reason that Holyrood was seen as a priority and was completed was that the rebuilding of the palace was paid for by the Privy Council. Following the failure of proposals for political union with England in 1669, the Council wanted to emphasise Edinburgh's position as a royal capital and seat of government. At the time, it seemed unlikely that Charles II would ever visit Edinburgh. In practice, the royal apartments would be occupied by the Lord High Commissioner, and the other apartments were to be given over as lodgings for various officers of state.

As Lord High Commissioner from 1669 to 1678, John Maitland, 1st Duke of Lauderdale was vicegerent in Scotland and, as the principal occupant of the new palace, he closely supervised the building operations. Plans for complete reconstruction were drawn up by Sir William Bruce, the Surveyor General of the King's Works, and Robert Mylne, the King's Master Mason. The design included a gothic south-west tower to mirror the existing north-west tower, a plan which had existed since at least Charles I's time. Following criticism of Bruce's initial plans for the internal layout from Charles II, Bruce redesigned the layout to provide suites of royal apartments on the first floor, with the Queen's Apartments (built for Catherine of Braganza) in the west range and the King's Apartments in the south and east ranges. The two were linked by the Great Gallery to the north, and the Council Chamber occupied the south-west tower.

Construction began in July 1671, starting at the north-west, which was ready for use by Lauderdale the following year, and by 1674 much of the work was complete. In 1675 Lord Haltoun became the first of many nobles to take up a grace-and-favour apartment in the palace. A second phase of work started in 1676, when the Duke of Lauderdale ordered Bruce to demolish and rebuild the main west façade, resulting by 1679 in the present west front which forms the main entrance. Bruce also constructed a kitchen block to the south-east of the Quadrangle. By 1679 the palace had been reconstructed, largely in its present form. Craftsmen employed included the Dutch carpenters Alexander Eizat and Jan van Santvoort, and their compatriot Jacob de Wet who painted several ceilings. The elaborate plasterwork was carried out by the English plasterers John Houlbert and George Dunsterfield. In November 1679, James, Duke of Albany, the future James VII, and his wife, Mary of Modena, took up residence at Holyrood following James's appointment as Lord High Commissioner. They resided at the palace until February 1680, and then again from October 1680 to May 1682, and during this period culture flourished in Edinburgh under the patronage of James's vice-regal court. His daughter Anne also resided at Holyrood between 1681 and 1682. When James acceded to the throne in 1685, the Catholic king set up a Jesuit college in the Chancellor's Lodging to the south of the palace. James VII founded the Order of the Thistle in May 1687 and Holyrood Abbey was designated as the chapel for the new order. The interiors of the chapel, and the Jesuit College, were subsequently destroyed by an anti-Catholic mob in December 1688, following the beginning of the Glorious Revolution.

=== 18th century ===
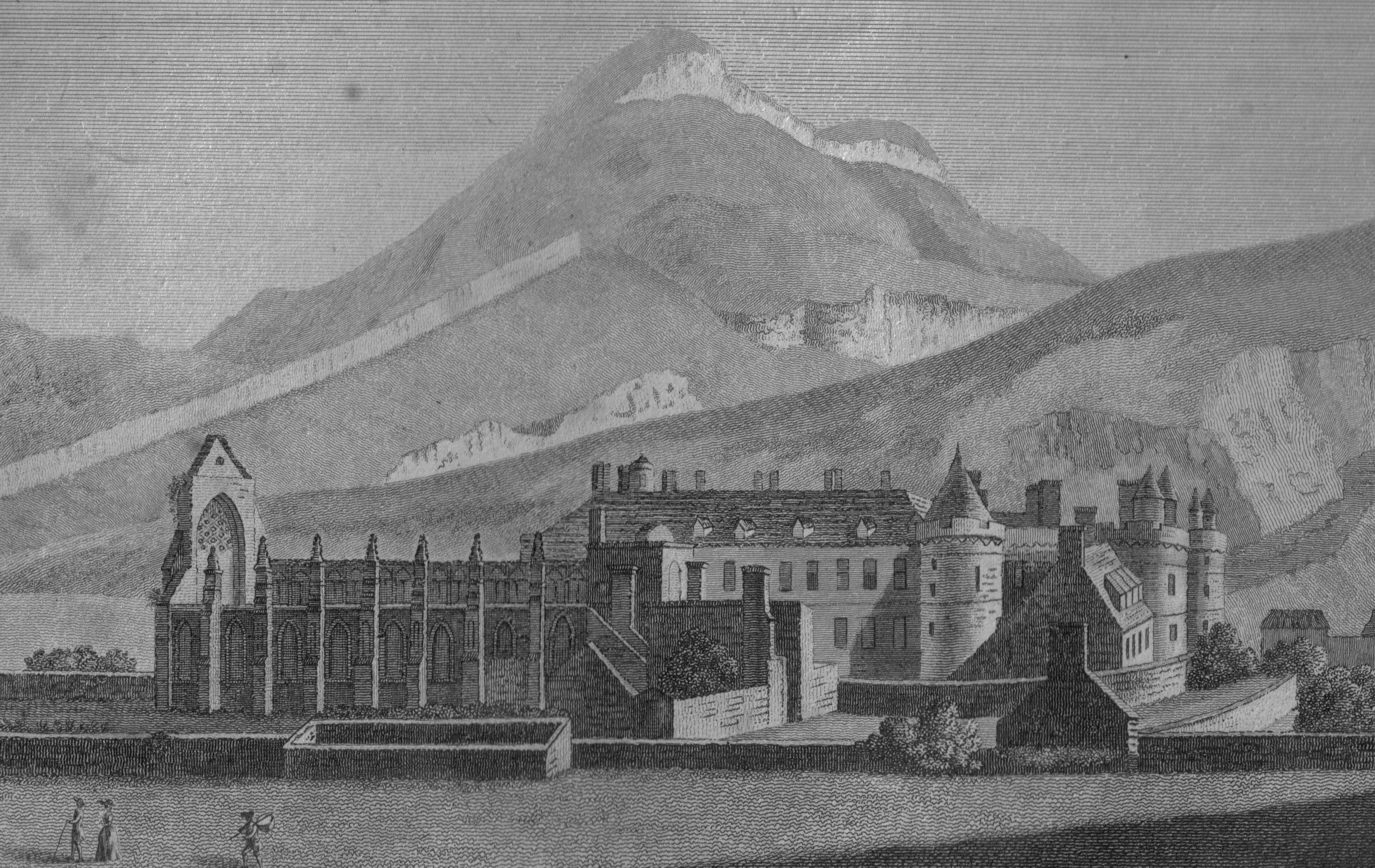
A view of the palace and abbey in 1789

After the Union of Scotland and England in 1707 the palace lost its principal functions. The office of Lord High Commissioner ceased to exist, and with the abolition of the Privy Council in 1708 the Council Chamber became redundant. The Dukes of Hamilton, as Hereditary Keepers, had already taken over the Queen's Apartments in James V's Tower 1684, while the King's Apartments were neglected, and various nobles occupied the grace-and-favour apartments in the palace.

Holyrood briefly became a royal palace once again when Charles Edward Stuart, as 'Prince Regent' for his father, set up court at the palace for six weeks in September and October 1745, during the Jacobite Rising. Charles occupied the Duke of Hamilton's apartments rather than the King's Apartments, and held balls and other entertainments in the Great Gallery. In January 1746, following their defeat by the Jacobite army at the Battle of Falkirk Muir, the government troops of Henry Hawley who were billeted in the palace damaged the royal portraits in the Gallery. The Duke of Cumberland also occupied the apartments in James V's Tower during his march north to Culloden. The potential of the palace as a tourist attraction was already being recognised, with the Duke of Hamilton allowing paying guests to view Mary, Queen of Scots´ apartments in James V's Tower. The precincts of Holyrood Abbey, extending to the whole of Holyrood Park, had been designated as a debtors' sanctuary since the 16th century. Those in debt could escape their creditors, and imprisonment, by taking up residence within the sanctuary, and a small community grew up to the west of the palace. The residents, known colloquially as "Abbey Lairds", were able to leave the sanctuary on Sundays, when no arrests were permitted. The area was controlled by a baillie, and by several constables, appointed by the Keeper of Holyroodhouse. The constables now form a ceremonial guard at the palace.

=== 19th century ===
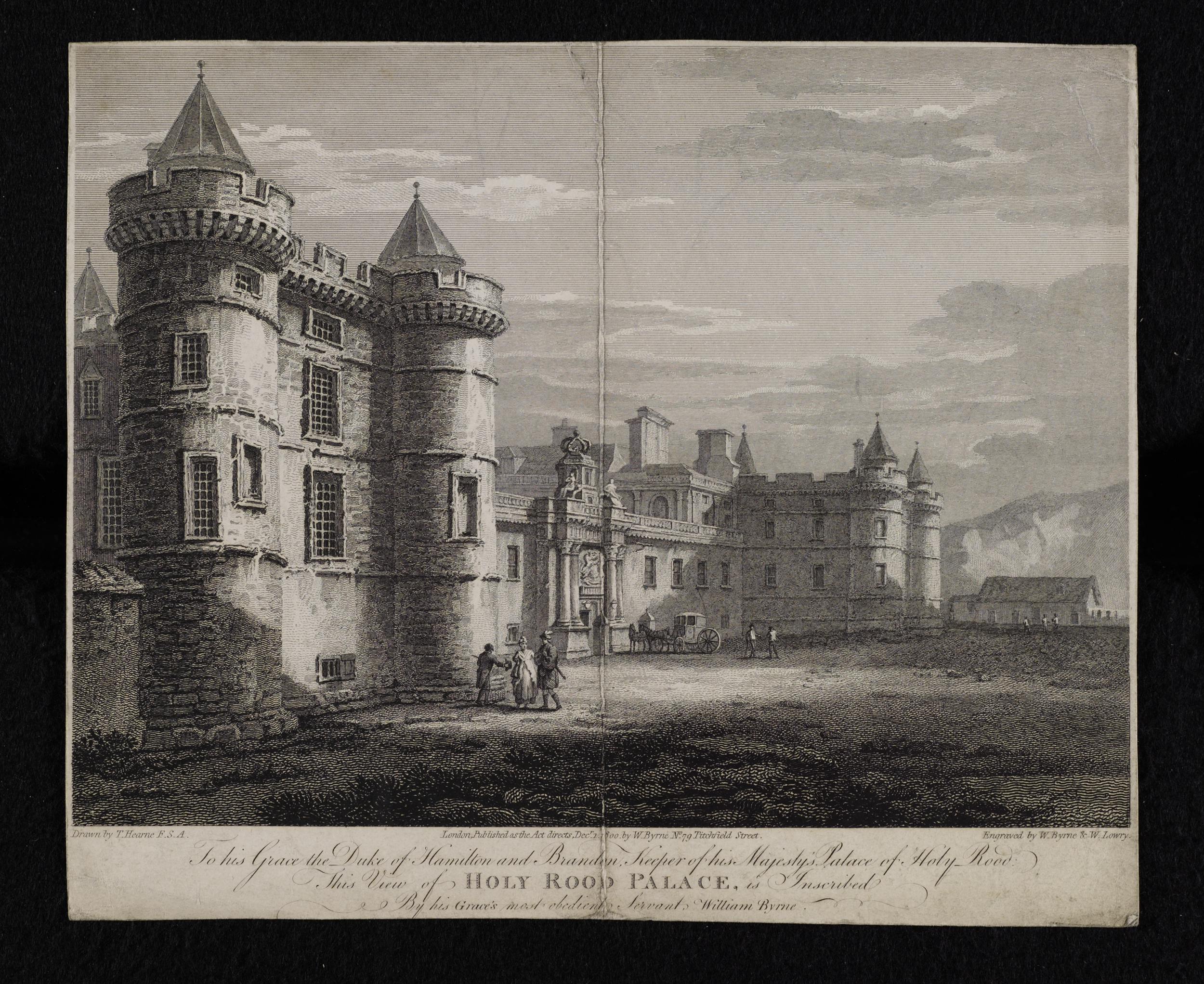
Engraving of Holy Rood Palace by Thomas Hearne, drawn in 1778, engraving published 1800.

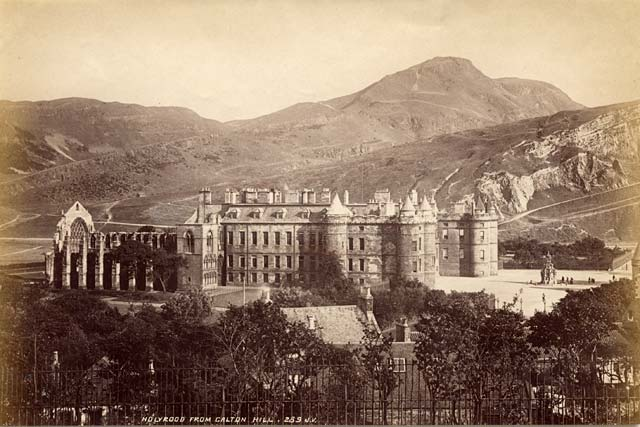
19th-century view of the palace from Calton Hill

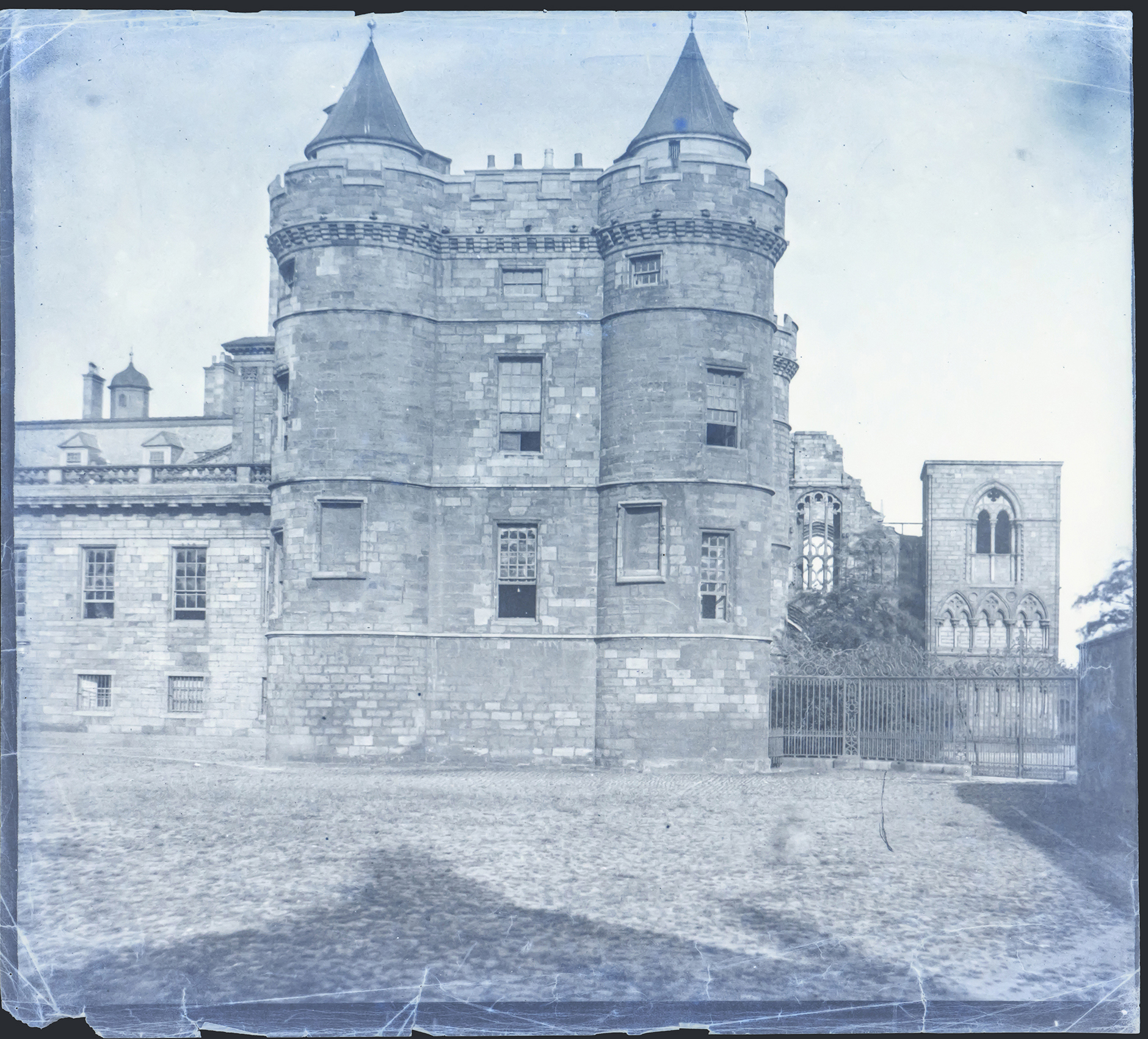
Holyrood Palace, waxed-paper negative by Thomas Keith, c. 1856 Department of Image Collections, National Gallery of Art Library, Washington DC

Following the French Revolution, George III allowed the Comte d'Artois, the exiled younger brother of Louis XVI of France, to live at the palace. Artois – who would accede to the French throne in 1824 as Charles X – resided at Holyrood from 1796 to 1803. He occupied the King's Apartments, and during this period the palace was refurbished. Artois took advantage of the sanctuary provided by the abbey to avoid his creditors. His sons, Louis Antoine and Charles Ferdinand, also spent periods at Holyrood with their father.

William Murray Nairne, 5th Lord Nairne, was appointed Assistant Inspector-General of Barracks in Scotland in 1806 and he and his wife, the songwriter and avid Jacobite Carolina Oliphant, enjoyed the use of the Royal Apartments as one of the perks of the post.

During his visit to Scotland in 1822, King George IV became the first reigning monarch since Charles I in 1641 to visit Holyrood. Although he was lodged at Dalkeith Palace, the king held a levée at Holyrood, received addresses, and was shown the historic apartments of Mary, Queen of Scots. He ordered repairs to the palace but declared that Queen Mary's rooms should be protected from any future changes. Between 1824 and 1834, Robert Reid oversaw works including the demolition of all the outlying buildings to the north and south of the quadrangle, and the refacing of the south front. Following the July Revolution of 1830, Charles X of France went into exile again, and he arrived to reside at Holyrood again in October, along with his grandson and heir, Henri, Count of Chambord, the Duke and Duchess of Angoulême, the Duchess of Berry, Louise Marie Thérèse d'Artois, and their household. The Bourbons remained in Edinburgh until September 1832, when they moved to Prague. In 1834 William IV agreed that the Lord High Commissioner to the General Assembly of the Church of Scotland could make use of the palace during the General Assembly's annual meeting, and this tradition continues today.

On the first visit of Queen Victoria to Scotland in 1842, she also stayed at Dalkeith Palace, and was prevented from visiting Holyrood due to an outbreak of scarlet fever in the vicinity. Renovations were carried out by Robert Matheson of the Office of Works in preparation for the queen and Prince Albert's 1850 residence at the palace, and the King's Apartments were refurbished by David Ramsay Hay: the King's Closet was used as the queen's breakfast room, the King's Ante-Chamber as the queen's bedroom, and the King's Bedchamber became Prince Albert's dressing room. A statue of Victoria was erected in the forecourt in 1851 (it was replaced by the fountain in 1858), and in 1855–56 the King's Drawing Room (the present Throne Room) was refitted by Robert Matheson. Over the next few years, the lodgings of the various nobles were gradually repossessed and, in 1871, Victoria was able to take possession of the second-floor apartments formerly occupied by the Dukes of Argyll (by virtue of their position as Masters of the Household) as her private apartments, freeing up the King's Apartments to be used as public apartments. From 1854 the historic apartments in James V's Tower were formally opened to the public. Victoria last resided at the palace in November 1886.

=== 20th century to the present day ===
Although Edward VII visited briefly in 1903, it was George V who transformed Holyrood into a modern palace, with the installation of central heating, electric lighting, the modernisation of the kitchens, and the addition of new bathrooms and a lift. In 1922 the palace was selected as the site of the Scottish National Memorial to Edward VII and a statue of Edward was erected on the forecourt, facing the abbey. As part of the memorial, the forecourt was also enclosed with boundary walls, richly decorated wrought-iron railings and gates. The palace was formally designated as the monarch's official residence in Scotland and became the location for regular royal ceremonies and events.

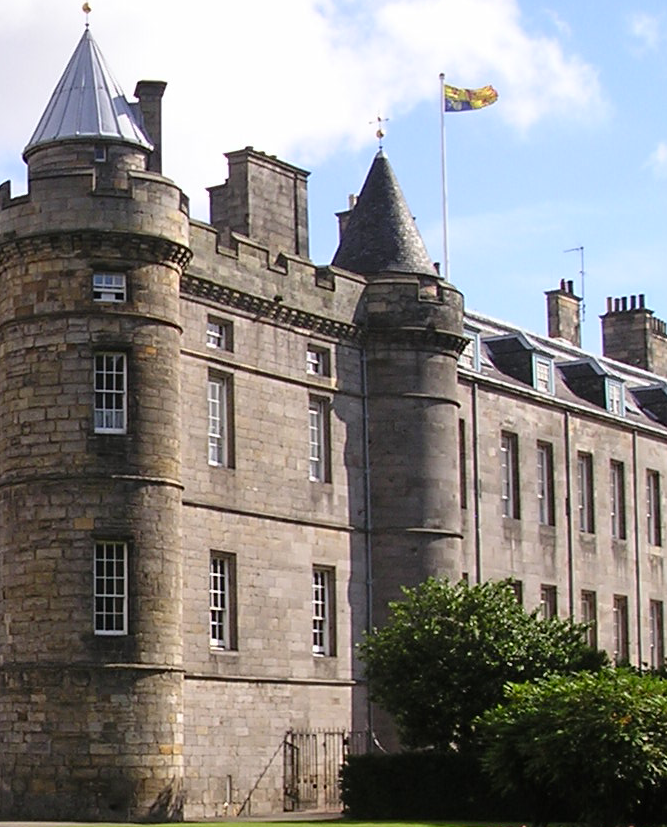
The Royal Standard used in Scotland is flown when the monarch is in residence.

The British monarch spends one week (known as "Royal Week") at the palace each summer. While serving as Duke of Rothesay, Charles III also stayed at Holyrood for one week a year, carrying out official duties. Following the death of Queen Elizabeth II at Balmoral Castle in September 2022, her coffin was transported to the palace, where it lay in repose in the Throne Room from 11 to 12 September, before being taken in procession to St Giles' Cathedral. These were the first obsequies held in Scotland for a monarch since the burial of James V at Holyrood Abbey in January 1543.

Investitures and banquets are held in the palace's Great Gallery, audiences are held in the Morning Drawing Room, lunch parties and receptions take place in the Throne Room, dinner parties are held in the State Dining Room, and annual garden parties are hosted in the gardens. When the King is in residence, the Scottish version of the Royal Standard of the United Kingdom is flown; at all other times, the Royal Banner of Scotland is displayed. During the King's visits, the Royal Company of Archers form his ceremonial bodyguard and the High Constables of Holyroodhouse provide a guard of honour. The Ceremony of the Keys, in which the King is formally presented with the keys of Edinburgh by the Lord Provost of Edinburgh, is held on the forecourt on his arrival. The wedding reception of Zara Phillips and Mike Tindall was held in the palace following their wedding at the Canongate Kirk in 2011.

In its role as the official residence of the monarch in Scotland, Holyrood has hosted a number of foreign visitors and dignitaries, including kings Olav V and Harald V of Norway, King Carl XVI Gustaf of Sweden, Mikhail Gorbachev, François Mitterrand, Helmut Kohl, Nelson Mandela, Vladimir Putin, Mary McAleese, Pope Benedict XVI, and Justin Trudeau. A meeting of the European Council was held at the palace in December 1992 during the British presidency of the council. Queen Elizabeth II gave a dinner at Holyrood for the Commonwealth heads of government in October 1997 during the Commonwealth Heads of Government Meeting in Edinburgh. Since 1834 the Lord High Commissioner to the General Assembly of the Church of Scotland resides at the palace for a week each year while the General Assembly is meeting.

Holyrood Palace remains the property of the Crown. As the official royal residence in Scotland, building conservation and maintenance work on the palace and abbey falls to the Scottish Government and is delivered on their behalf by the Conservation Directorate of Historic Environment Scotland. Public access is managed by the Royal Collection Trust, with revenues used to support the work of the trust as custodians of the Royal Collection. In April 2016, the Royal Collection Trust announced it was to fund a £10m project to redevelop the outside space at Holyrood, including the abbey, grounds and forecourt. The project was completed at the end of 2018 in partnership with Historic Environment Scotland, and included the restoration of the Abbey Strand buildings which now house a learning centre.

== Architecture ==
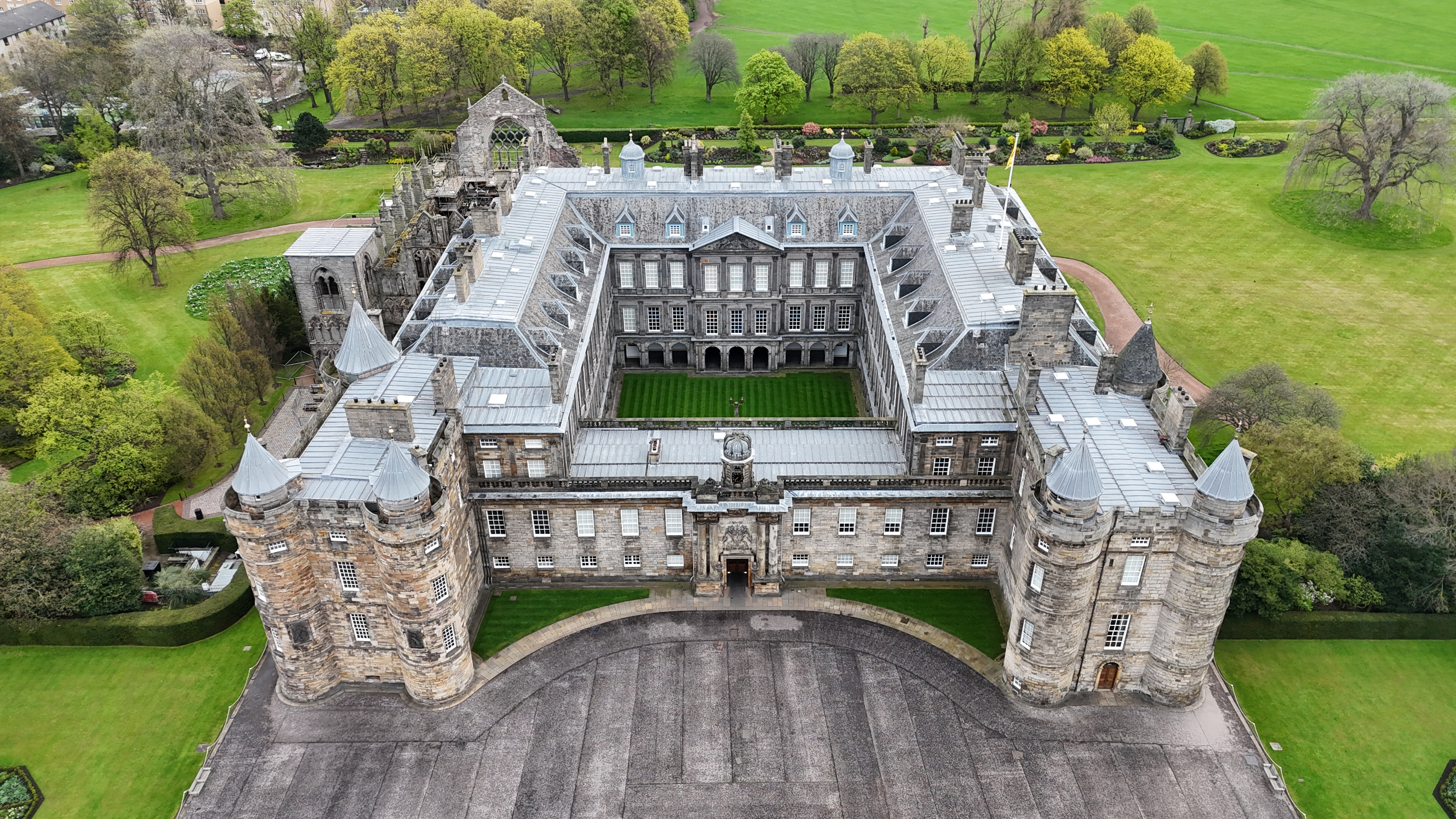
Aerial view of Holyrood Palace

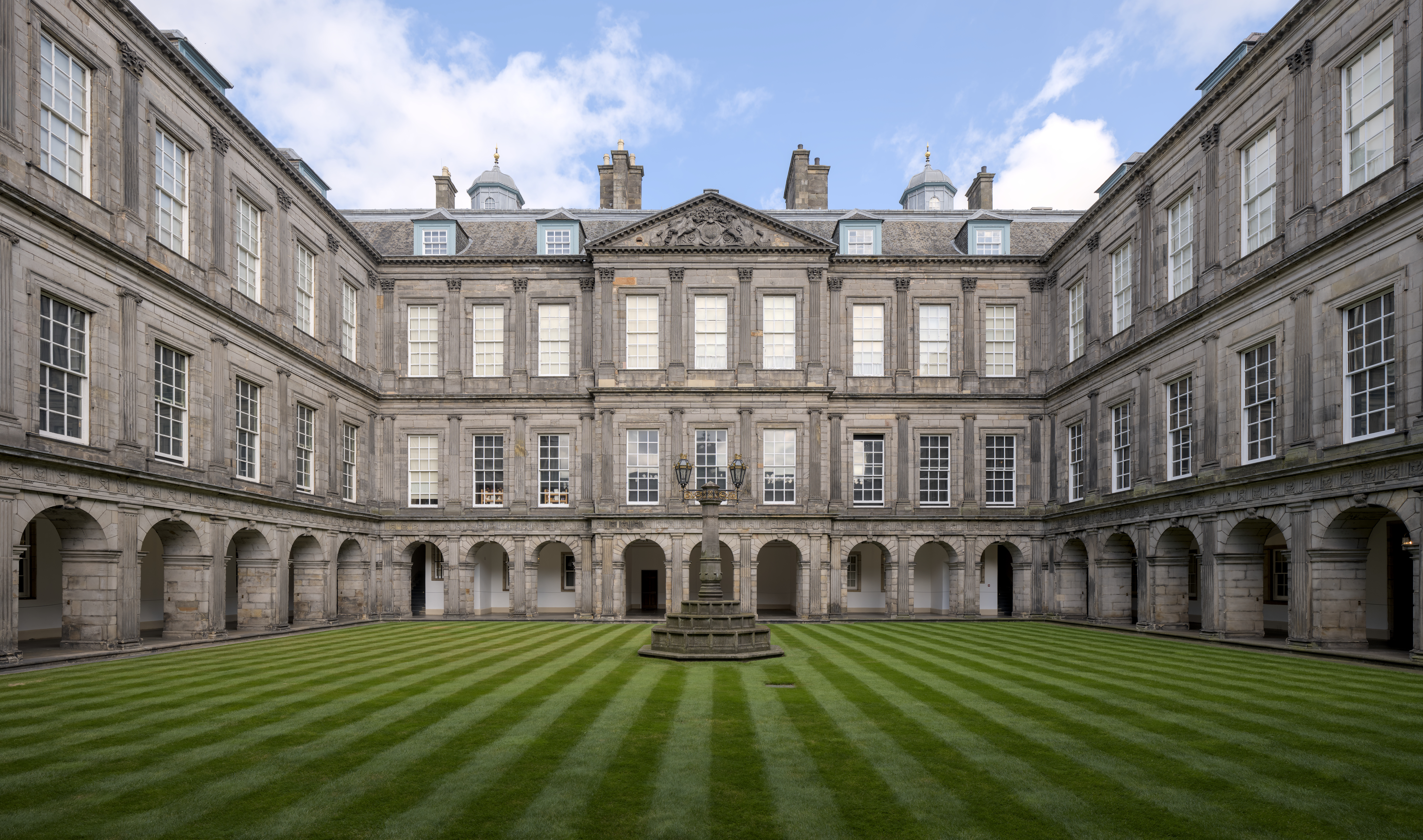
The Quadrangle, designed by Sir William Bruce, reflects the Palace's monastic origins with its cloister-like layout

The palace as it stands today was designed by Sir William Bruce and built between 1671 and 1678, with the exception of the 16th-century north-west tower built by James V. The palace is laid out round a central, classical-style three-storey plus attic quadrangle layout. The palace extends approximately 230 feet (70 m) from north to south and 230 feet (70 m) from east to west. The 16th-century north-west tower is balanced with a matching south-west tower, each with a pair of circular angle turrets with ball-finialled, conical bell-cast roofs. The towers are linked by a recessed two-storey front, with the central principal entrance framed by giant Doric columns and surmounted by the carved Royal arms of Scotland. Above the arms a crowned cupola with a clock rises behind a broken pediment supported by dolphins, on which are two reclining figures.

The north and south fronts have symmetrical three-storey facades that rise behind to far left and right of the two-storey west front with regular arrangement of bays. General repairs were completed by the architect Robert Reid between 1824 and 1834 that included the partial rebuilding of the south-west corner tower and refacing of the entire south front in ashlar to match that of the east. The east (rear) elevation has 17 bays with lightly superimposed pilasters of the three classical orders on each floor. The ruins of the abbey church connect to the palace on the north-east corner. For the internal quadrangle, Bruce designed a colonnaded piazza of nine arches on the north, south and east facades with pilasters, again from the three classical orders, to indicate the importance of the three main floors. The plain Doric order is used for the services of the ground floor, the Ionic order is used for the State Apartments on the first floor, while the elaborate Corinthian order is used for the royal apartments on the second floor.

Architectural historian Dan Cruickshank selected the palace as one of his eight choices for the 2002 BBC book The Story of Britain's Best Buildings.

== Interior ==
The palace covers 87,120 square feet (8,093 m2) of floor space and contains 289 rooms. The private apartments of the King and the other members of the Royal Family are located on the second floor of the south and east wings. The 17 rooms open to the public include the 17th-century State Apartments, the Great Gallery, and the 16th-century apartments in James V's Tower. The painting An Incident in the Rebellion of 1745 by David Morier is in the lobby of the Palace.

=== State Apartments ===
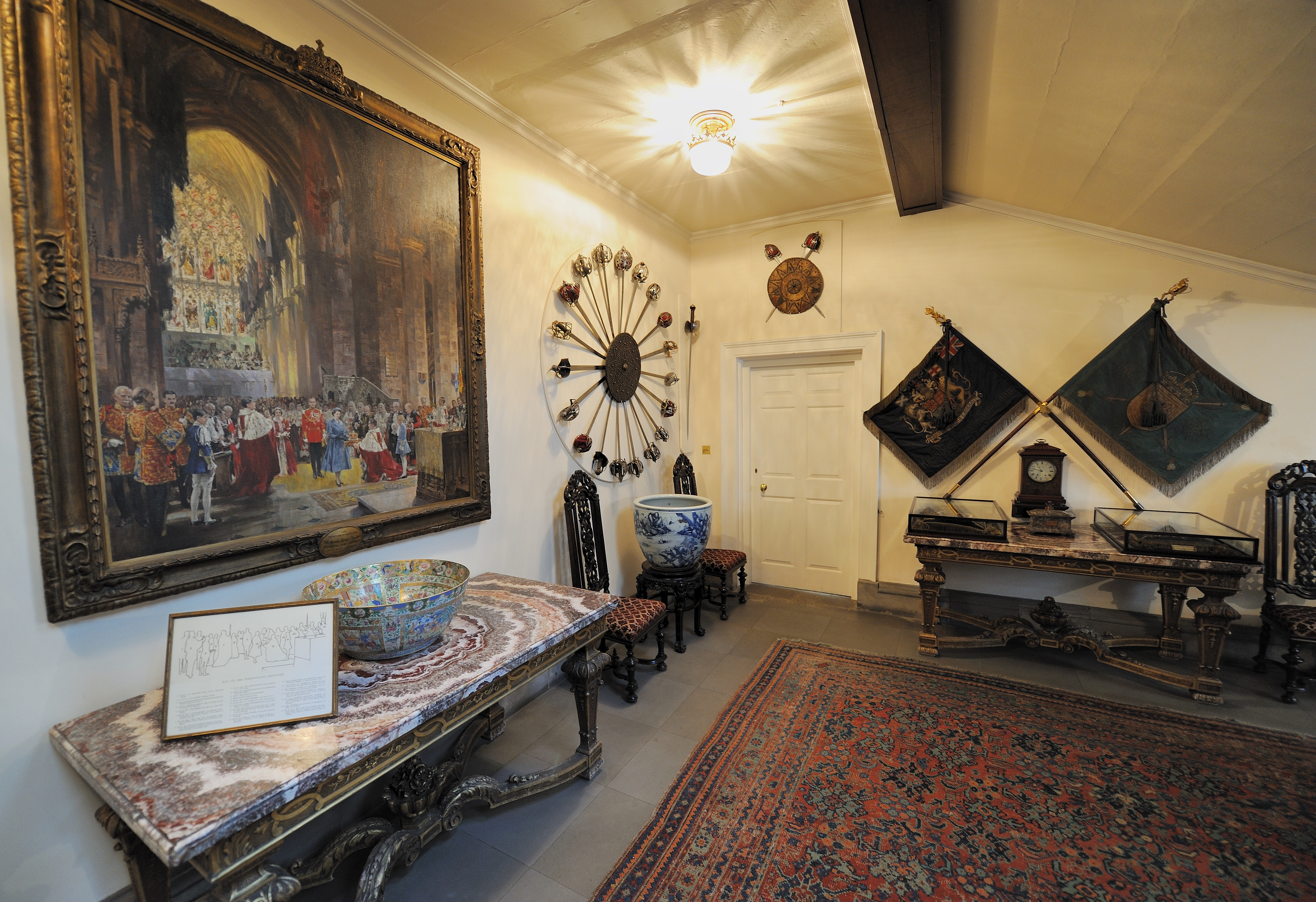
The lobby of the Great Stair.

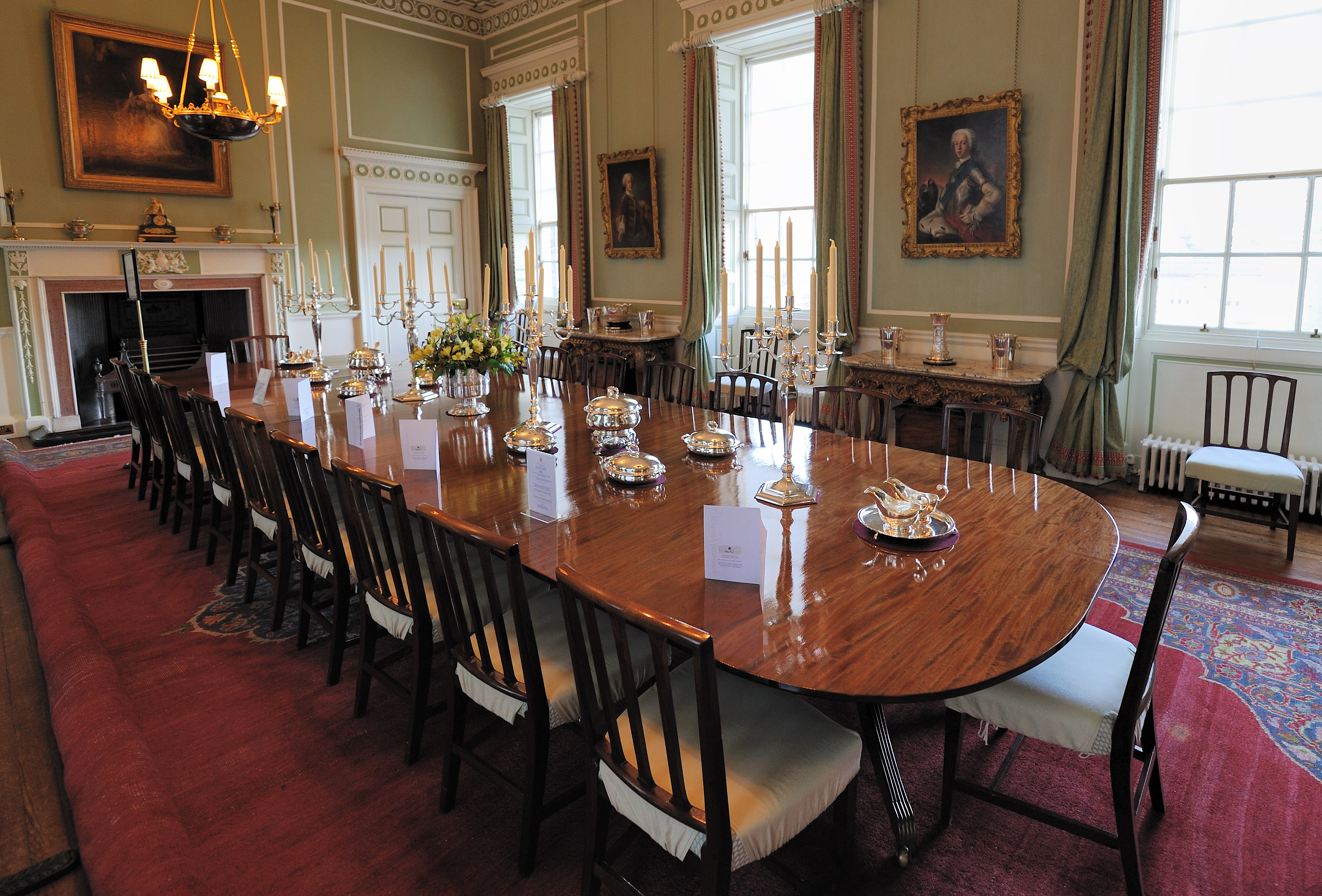
The Royal Dining Room.

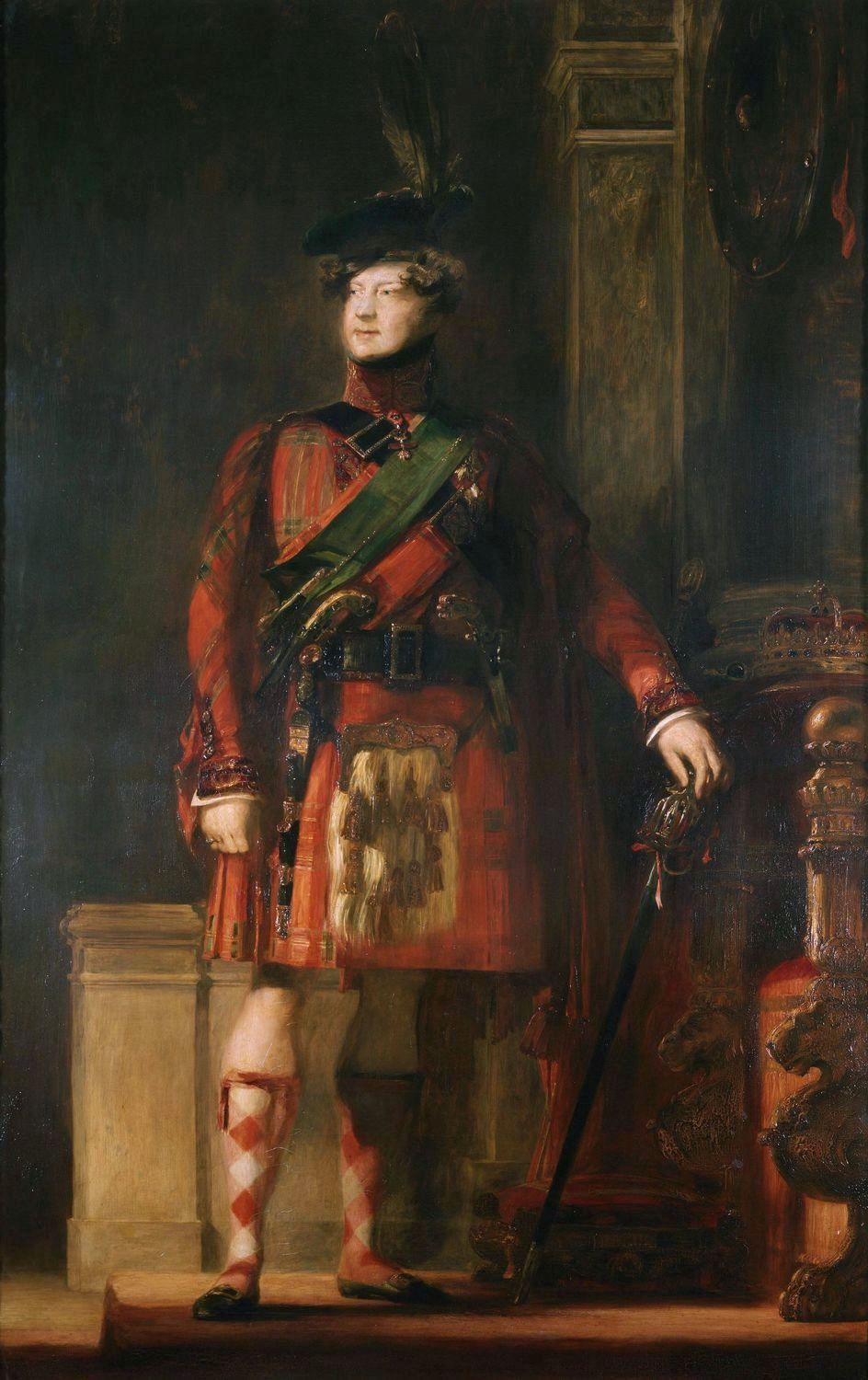
George IV in Highland Dress, 1829. Sir David Wilkie's portrait of the kilted king hangs in the Royal Dining Room.

The Great Stair in the south-west corner of the Quadrangle has a 17th-century Baroque ceiling featuring plaster angels holding the Honours of Scotland. The Italian paintings on the walls are fragments of frescoes painted circa 1550 by Lattanzio Gambara, illustrating scenes from Ovid's Metamorphoses. They were bought by Prince Albert in 1856, and placed here in 1881. At the top of the stair are the entrances to the West Drawing Room - the former Council Chamber - and the Royal Dining Room. The latter was originally the Queen's Guard Chamber and formed part of the Queen's Apartments. The Dining Room's Adam style decoration dates from around 1800, when this was part of the Duke of Hamilton's apartments. The room was first used as a dining room at the end of Queen Victoria's reign, and continues to be used as such. The room features portraits of Bonnie Prince Charlie, George IV, Victoria and Elizabeth II, along with the 3,000-piece silver banqueting service commissioned to mark the Silver Jubilee of George V in 1935.

The King's Apartments occupied the whole of the south and east sides of the Quadrangle. Accessed from the Great Stair, the suite of rooms comprised a guard chamber, presence chamber, privy chamber, antechamber, bedchamber and closet. The level of privacy, as well as the richness of decoration, increased in sequence. The Throne Room was originally the King's Guard Chamber, but was used as the King's Drawing Room from the visit of George IV in 1822, when a throne and canopy of state were erected at the west end of the room for the levees hosted there. Queen Victoria used the room as a dining room, before it became the Throne Room in 1871. The 1822 throne was replaced in 1911 by a pair of throne chairs made for George V and Queen Mary, which sit upon the dais beneath the Royal Arms of Scotland. In 1929 a new ceiling was installed that matched the others in the King's Apartments, and oak-panelled walls which incorporate paintings were installed. The paintings include the John Michael Wright portrait of Charles II and Peter Lely's portraits of Catherine of Braganza, James VII and Mary of Modena.

The Evening Drawing Room was originally Charles II's Presence Chamber, where important visitors would have been received by the king. The ornate plasterwork ceiling is one of the original series designed to mark the processional route to the King's Bedchamber. The Royal Family use the room for receptions. The Morning Drawing Room was Charles II's Privy Chamber. The ceiling is decorated in the corners with cherubs and eagles bearing the cipher of Charles II and the Honours of Scotland, while the long central panels feature heraldic lions and unicorns. The French tapestries purchased for Charles II in 1668 tell the story of Diana, the goddess of the hunt. Charles III uses the Morning Drawing Room to give private audiences to the First Minister, the Presiding Officer of the Scottish Parliament, and other visiting dignitaries.

The King's Antechamber, Bedchamber and Closet are laid out along the east side of the palace. The King's Bedchamber, at the centre of the east façade, has the finest of the 17th-century plaster ceilings, augmented by paintings of Hercules by Jacob de Wet II. The 17th-century State Bed has been in the palace since 1684, and was probably made for the Dukes of Hamilton, although it was long referred to as "Queen Mary's Bed" when it occupied Mary, Queen of Scots' rooms. The King's Closet was designed to be the king's study.

=== The Great Gallery ===
The Great Gallery, at 150 feet (45 m) in length, is the largest room in the palace and connects the King's Closet on the east side with the Queen's Lobby in James V's Tower to the west. The Gallery features a pair of black marble chimneypieces within Doric surrounds, framed by Ionic pilasters. The most notable decorative features of the gallery are 96 of the 111 original portraits of the Scottish monarchs, beginning with the legendary Fergus I, who supposedly ruled from 330 BC. The Dutch painter Jacob de Wet was commissioned by Charles II to paint the portraits, illustrating both real and legendary monarchs, from Fergus I to James VII. The portraits were completed between 1684 and 1686, and celebrate the royal bloodline of Scotland which the Scots upheld for its continuity and antiquity as an important part of their national identity in the seventeenth century. The Great Gallery has served many purposes over the centuries. Following the Union of 1707 it was the venue for the election of Scottish representative peers in the House of Lords until 1963. Bonnie Prince Charlie held evening balls in the Gallery during his brief occupation, and following his victory at the Battle of Falkirk Muir in January 1746, the defeated government troops were quartered in the Gallery. While the Comte d'Artois was in residence it served as a Catholic chapel, and in the early 20th century it was used as the State Dining Room. Today it is used for large functions including investitures and banquets. The Gallery contains the Tam o' Shanter Chair, a Gothic-style oak armchair which celebrates the work of Robert Burns. It was made by John Underwood of Ayr from a portion of the roof of Alloway Auld Kirk, which is the setting for much of the poem "Tam o' Shanter". By the time that Burns was at the height of his fame, the Kirk had become a ruin and the timbers of the roof were used to make a number of Burns-related memorabilia and souvenirs. The chair was presented to George IV in 1822.

=== James V's Tower ===
The suite of rooms on the first floor of James V's Tower is accessed from the Queen's Lobby and comprises the Queen's Antechamber and the Queen's Bedchamber, leading from which are two turret rooms or closets. During the 1560s these rooms were occupied by Lord Darnley and, following the rebuilding of the palace in the 1670s, they became part of the Queen's Apartments. The Duke of Hamilton took over the rooms in James V's Tower from 1684, and the Ante-Chamber became the Duke's dining room. Much of the decoration of this room dates from the mid nineteenth century, when the historical apartments in James V's Tower were opened to visitors. The room also contains a series of tapestries and portraits of Elizabeth, Queen of Bohemia, the daughter of James VI.

The Queen's Bedroom (also known as Lord Darnley's Bedchamber) is dominated by the so-called 'Darnley' bed. The bed was actually supplied to the Duke of Hamilton in 1682. The Stuart connection was provided by Bonnie Prince Charlie, who occupied the Duke of Hamilton's apartments in 1745, and slept in this bed. The room is linked by a small spiral staircase to Mary, Queen of Scots' Bedchamber on the second floor.

The suite of rooms on the second floor of James V's Tower was occupied by Mary, Queen of Scots from 1561 until 1567. Mary Queen of Scots' Outer Chamber was where Mary, Queen of Scots received her visitors and where her famous audiences with John Knox took place. It is also the room in which David Rizzio, Mary's private secretary, was stabbed and his alleged bloodstain can be seen in the place where his body was left. The room is now used to display a range of Stuart and Jacobite relics that have been collected by successive monarchs. Among the relics associated with Queen Mary are an embroidery of a cat and a mouse, made whilst she was in captivity in England. This possibly alludes to her relationship with her cousin, Elizabeth I of England, with Mary as the mouse and Elizabeth the cat. The so-called 'Darnley Jewel', was probably made for Margaret, Countess of Lennox, mother of Queen Mary's second husband, Lord Darnley. The emblems and inscriptions refer to the countess's hopes and ambitions for her grandson, the future James VI. The Jewel was purchased by Queen Victoria from the collection of Horace Walpole in 1842. The Memorial to Lord Darnley was also commissioned by Lord Darnley's parents, after his murder, and may implicate Queen Mary in his death. Several of the inscriptions have been removed, possibly by James VI, depicted as a child in the picture, mourning his father. The compartmented oak ceiling in Mary, Queen of Scots' Bedchamber dates from Queen Mary's time, and the monograms IR (Jacobus Rex) and MR (Maria Regina) refer to her parents, James V and Mary of Guise. Below the ceiling is a frieze, painted in grisaille with the Honours of Scotland.

== Gardens and grounds ==
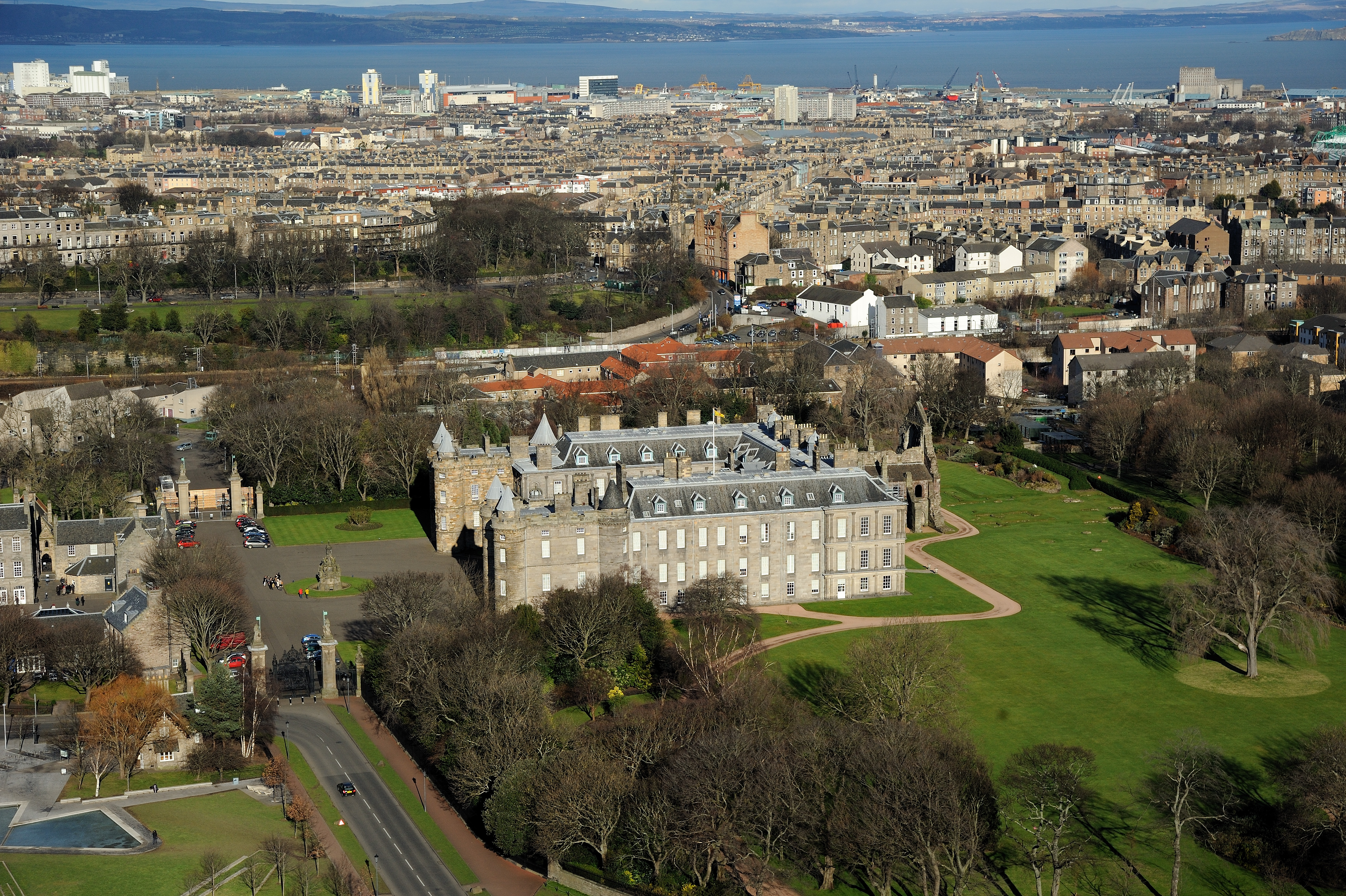
Bird's-eye view of the palace and abbey, including the western towers

The gardens of the palace extend to some 10 acres (4.0 ha), set within the much larger Holyrood Park. In the 16th century, a privy garden was located to the north of the palace, accessed via a wooden gallery from the north-west tower. This was removed in 1857 when Prince Albert took an interest in the grounds, forming a new carriage drive to the north to avoid the Canongate slums and laying out the garden in its present form.

A small garden building, surviving from the 16th century, is known as Queen Mary's Bath House, although it is not thought to have been used for bathing. The sundial to the north of the palace was carved in 1633 by John Mylne, while the sandstone fountain in the centre of the forecourt was erected in 1858 by Robert Matheson and is based on the design of the 16th-century fountain at Linlithgow Palace. The ornamental screens and the decorative wrought-iron entrance gates to the north, west and south of the forecourt were designed by George Washington Browne and were erected in 1920 as a memorial to Edward VII, along with a statue of Edward by Henry Snell Gamley which was unveiled by George V in 1922. The buildings to the west of the forecourt are the Gatehouse and former Guard Rooms (1861) (which replaced the tenements of debtors' sanctuary), the Palace Coach House, the former stables (1861), the Café at the Palace in the Mews Courtyard, and the King's Gallery.

In 1987 the Holyrood Palace and Park were added to the Inventory of Gardens and Designed Landscapes in Scotland.

=== "Big Royal Dig" ===
Holyrood Palace, along with Buckingham Palace Garden and Windsor Castle, was excavated on 25–28 August 2006 as part of a special edition of Channel 4's archaeology series Time Team. The archaeologists uncovered part of the cloister of Holyrood Abbey, running in line with the existing abbey ruins, and a square tower associated with the 15th-century building works of James IV was discovered. The team failed to locate evidence of the real tennis court used by Queen Mary to the north of the palace, as the area had been built over in the 19th century. An area of reddened earth was discovered, which was linked with the Earl of Hertford's burning of Holyrood during the Rough Wooing of 1544. Among the objects found were a seal matrix used to stamp the wax seal on correspondence or documents, and a French double tournois coin, minted by Gaston d'Orléans in 1634.

== See also ==
- Holyrood (disambiguation)
- Historic Environment Scotland (Executive agency of the Scottish Government responsible for Holyrood Abbey)
