= 650s =

Decade

The 650s decade ran from January 1, 650, to December 31, 659.

== Events ==
=== By place ===
==== Europe ====
- The Khazar Khaganate extends from the Dnieper to the Caspian Sea, and establishes the city, Itil, as its capital on the shore of the Caspian. Northward it extends to the headwaters of the Volga. Their rulers accept the Jewish religion, apparently to assert their independence from both Muslims and Christians (approximate date).
- A Rashidun army under Abd al-Rahman ibn Rabi'a is annihilated by the Khazars, near the city of Balanjar (Northern Caucasus). During the battle, both sides use catapults against the other (approximate date).

==== Britain ====
- The Mercians under King Penda move on East Anglia, destroy the monastery at Burgh Castle and expel King Anna who probably flees to Magonsæte (approximate date).
- King Oswiu of Bernicia seeks Irish support against the forces of Penda. While in Ireland he has a liaison with Fín, the granddaughter of King Colmán Rímid Uí Néill (approximate date).
- King Cloten of Dyfed (Southern Wales) marries Princess Ceindrech of Brycheiniog, and unites the two kingdoms (approximate date).

==== Asia ====
- The first Chinese paper money is issued, yet these banknotes will not become government-issued until the Song dynasty era Sichuan province issues them in the year 1024, with the central government of China following suit in the 12th century.
- Emperor Kōtoku is presented a white pheasant; he is pleased and begins a new Japanese era name (nengō) to be called Hakuchi, meaning 'The White Pheasant'.

==== Americas ====
- Earliest confirmed date of habitation in the area around what is now Bluff, Utah by humans.
- Yuknoom Chʼeen II, ruler of Calakmul, attacks Dos Pilas and forces its leader, Bʼalaj Chan Kʼawiil, and a likely heir to the throne of Tikal, to take refuge at Aguateca, beginning the Second Tikal–Calakmul War.
- Jamaica is settled by the Ostinoid people, ancestors of the Taíno. They were farmers, potters, and villagers with socially complex societies. These people lived near the coast and extensively hunted turtles and fish.

==== Oceania ====
- According to legend, the Polynesian traveller Ui-te-Rangiora sailed south into the Southern Ocean where they sighted ice floes and icebergs, eventually naming the area Te tai-uka-a-pia.

=== By topic ===
==== Religion ====
- St. Martin's Church is built in Canterbury, England (approximate date).

==== Art and science ====
- The panel of the Tamamushi Shrine, the so called "Hungry Tigress Jataka", is made during the Asuka period (Japan). It is now kept at Horyu-ji Treasure House (approximate date).

=== By place ===
==== Europe ====
- King Clovis II of Neustria and Burgundy marries Balthild, said to be an Anglo-Saxon aristocrat sold into slavery in Gaul. She has been owned by Clovis' mayor of the palace, Erchinoald, who gives her to him to garner royal favour (approximate date).

==== Britain ====
- King Oswiu of Bernicia declares war on his rival, King Oswine of Deira. Oswine refuses to engage him in battle, and retreats to Gilling (North Yorkshire). Oswine is betrayed by a friend, and murdered by Oswiu's soldiers.
- Œthelwald succeeds his uncle Oswine as king of Deira, and allies himself with Oswiu's enemy, King Penda of Mercia. Queen Eanflæd of Bernicia donates the estate of Gilling for the foundation of a monastery.

==== Persia ====
- King Yazdegerd III of Persia is murdered in a miller's hut near Merv by his followers, ending both Persian resistance to Arab conquest, and the Sassanid Empire.

==== Arabian Caliphate ====
- The Rashidun army under Abdullah ibn Aamir invades Afghanistan, and captures the main forts in Khorasan (modern Iran). The Muslim Arabs occupy the cities of Balkh and Herat, which surrender peacefully.
- An embassy led by Sa`d ibn Abi Waqqas arrives in the capital Chang'an via an oversea route. They are greeted by Emperor Gao Zong, who orders the establishment of the first Chinese mosque.
- The Quran is compiled by Caliph Uthman ibn Affan in its modern-day form. The text becomes the model from which copies are made and promulgated throughout the urban centers of the Arab world.

=== By topic ===
==== Religion ====
- The Hôtel-Dieu de Paris is founded by bishop Landry (Landericus). It becomes the first major hospital in Paris.

=== By place ===
==== Europe ====
- King Rothari dies after a 16-year reign, and is succeeded by his son Rodoald as king of the Lombards.

==== Britain ====
- King Penda of Mercia invades Bernicia, and besieges King Oswiu at Bamburgh, in North East England.

==== Arab Empire ====
- Arab–Byzantine War: An Arab fleet under Abdullah ibn Sa'ad defeats the Byzantine fleet (500 ships) off the coast of Alexandria.
- Siege of Dongola: A Rashidun army (5,000 men) under Abdullah ibn Sa'ad besieges Dongola in the Kingdom of Makuria (modern Sudan).
- Uthman ibn Affan establishes a treaty (the Baqt) between the Christian Nubians and the Muslims in Egypt, that lasts for six centuries, including the tribute of 400 slaves annually.
- Abdel al Rahman ibn Awf, companion (sahabah) of Muhammad, frees 30,000 slaves at his death (approximate date).

==== Asia ====
- The registers of population are prepared in Japan. Fifty houses are made a township, and for each township there is appointed an elder. The houses are all associated in groups of five for mutual protection, with one elder to supervise them one with another. This system prevails until the era of World War II.
- The Giant Wild Goose Pagoda is constructed in Chang'an (modern Xi'an), during the Tang dynasty (China). It is completed in the same year, during the reign of Emperor Gao Zong.

=== By place ===
==== Byzantine Empire ====
- Emperor Constans II voluntarily surrenders Armenia to the Arabs, following a truce with Muawiyah, governor of Syria. Muawiyah grants the Armenians virtual autonomy, and appoints the nakharar Theodor Rshtuni as ruler of Armenia.
- Muawiyah leads a raid against Rhodes, taking the scattered pieces of the Colossus of Rhodes (one of the Seven Wonders of the Ancient World) and shipping it back to Syria, where he destroys the bronze scrap to make coins.

==== Europe ====
- King Rodoald is murdered after a six-month reign, and is succeeded by Aripert I, who is elected as king of the Lombards. He spreads Catholicism over the Lombard realm and builds many new churches through the kingdom.
- Atto succeeds Theodelap as duke of Spoleto, in Central Italy (approximate date).

==== Britain ====
- King Penda of Mercia secures dominance over the area of Middle Anglia, where he establishes his son Peada as ruler.
- Peada marries Alchflaed, daughter of King Oswiu of Bernicia, and is baptised at Ad Murum (in the region of Hadrian's Wall) by bishop Finan.
- King Œthelwald of Deira rejects Oswiu's overlordship, and turns to Penda instead. Penda mounts another attack against Bernicia (approximate date).
- Talorgan I, nephew of Oswiu, is crowned king of the Picts. He probably accepts Northumbrian overlordship and pays tribute.
- King Sigeberht I of Essex dies after a 36-year reign, and is succeeded by his relative Sigeberht II.
- Sigeberht II is persuaded by Oswiu to adopt Christianity, as part of a mobilization against Penda.

==== Asia ====
- Emperor Kōtoku sends an embassy to the court of the Tang dynasty in China. Japanese ambassadors, priests and students sail for the capital Chang'an, but some of the ships are lost en route.
- Prince Tenji of Japan changes his residence to Asuka (Nara Prefecture), with other imperial family members and ministers. Only Emperor Kōtoku stays in the Naniwa Palace (approximate date).

=== By topic ===
==== Religion ====
- June 17 – Pope Martin I is arrested in the Lateran in Rome, along with Maximus the Confessor, on the orders of Emperor Constans II, and taken to imprisonment in Constantinople.
- Northumbrian missionaries under St. Cedd are despatched to Essex, to found the monastery at Bradwell-on-Sea.
- The Temple of Sinheungsa in Gangwon Province (South Korea) is constructed by the Buddhist monk Jajang.

=== By place ===
==== Byzantine Empire ====
- Emperor Constans II appoints his son Constantine IV, age 2, co-emperor (Augustus). He is too young to rule as monarch of the Byzantine Empire, and his title remains a given name.

==== Europe ====
- King Recceswinth draws up the Liber Judiciorum at Toledo, a Visigothic code based on Roman law, that establishes equality between Goths and Hispano-Romans without regard to racial or cultural differences.

==== Britain ====
- King Penda of Mercia defeats the East Anglians at Bulcamp near Blythburgh (Suffolk). King Anna of East Anglia and his son Jurmin are killed.
- Æthelhere succeeds his brother Anna as king of East Anglia, and accepts Mercian overlordship (approximate date).

==== Arabian Caliphate ====
- Muawiyah, governor of Syria, stations a large garrison on Cyprus. He conquers the Greek island of Kos in the Dodecanese.
- Arab invaders cross the Oxus River, in what later will be Uzbekistan. Nomadic Turkic tribes continue to control Central Asia.

==== Asia ====
- November 24 – Emperor Kōtoku dies after a 9-year reign; Kōgyoku (his elder sister) is restored on the throne under the name Saimei.
- Takamuko no Kuromaro, a Japanese diplomat, is sent to the Tang dynasty again, but dies upon his arrival in Chang'an.
- Nakatomi no Kamatari, the inner minister (naidaijin) of Japan, is granted the Shikwan (the Purple Cap). ^{[Ambiguous; Significance of this is unclear]}
- Muyeol becomes king of the Korean kingdom of Silla.

=== By topic ===
==== Religion ====
- August 10 – The exiled Pope Martin I is deposed, and succeeded by Eugene I, as the 75th pope of the Roman Catholic Church. On September 17, Martin is taken to Constantinople and publicly humiliated, for having condemned the Byzantine Emperor Constans II in 649.
- Philibert, Frankish abbot, receives a gift from King Clovis II of Neustria, and founds Jumièges Abbey in Normandy.

=== By place ===
==== Byzantine Empire ====
- Battle of the Masts: Emperor Constans II personally commands the Byzantine fleet (500 ships), and sets off to challenge the Arab navy. He sails to the province of Lycia (now in Turkey) in the southern region of Asia Minor. The two forces meet off the coast of Mount Phoenix, near the harbour of Phoenix (modern Finike). The Arabs under Abdullah ibn Sa'ad are victorious in battle, although losses are heavy for both sides. Constans barely escapes to Constantinople.

==== Britain ====
- November 15 – Battle of the Winwaed: King Oswiu of Bernicia defeats his rival, King Penda of Mercia at Cock Beck, near what later will be Leeds (Yorkshire). Kings Cadafael Cadomedd of Gwynedd and Œthelwald of Deira, allies of Mercia, withdraw their forces before the battle begins. It marks the defeat of the last credible pagan force in England. It also sows the seeds which will lead to Anglo-Saxon acceptance of the Catholic Church (approximate date).
- Oswiu becomes overlord (bretwalda) over much of Great Britain. He establishes himself as king of Mercia, setting up his son-in-law, Penda's son Peada, as a subject king over Middle Anglia.

==== Asia ====
- Empress Kōgyoku re-ascends to the throne of Japan, beginning a new reign as Saimei-tennō.
- Arab armies conquer Khurasan (Iran), and the Silk Road along Transoxiana (Central Asia).
- King Vikramaditya I of Chalukya (India) re-unites the kingdom, after defeating his brothers.

=== By topic ===
==== Religion ====
- May 15 – Pope Martin I is banished to Chersonesos Taurica (Ukraine). He dies later in the Crimean Peninsula after a 6-year reign, leaving Eugene I as the uncontested pope (see 654).
- Peada founds Peterborough Cathedral (Province of Canterbury). It becomes one of the first centres of Christianity in England. Deusdedit is consecrated as archbishop of Canterbury.

=== By place ===
==== Europe ====
- February 1 – King Sigebert III of Austrasia, age 25, dies after a 22-year reign. His 5-year-old son Dagobert II is kidnapped by the court chancellor, Grimoald the Elder, who makes his own son king, and exiles him to an Irish monastery. Dagobert is placed with Bishop Dido of Poitiers, while Grimoald's son Childebert the Adopted assumes the Austrasian throne.

==== Britain ====
- King Oswiu of Northumbria invades Pengwern (modern Wales) and kills King Cynddylan in battle, near the River Trent. Cynddylan's brother Morfael and the rest of the royal family flee to Glastening (Wessex).
- King Œthelwald of Deira is removed from office by his uncle Oswiu, because of his desertion at the Battle of the Winwaed, and replaced by the latter's son Alhfrith, as subject king in a united Northumbria.

==== Arabian Empire ====
- First Islamic Civil War: An armed revolt erupts in Egypt; several Muslim sympathisers travel to Medina to rally support, beginning the fitna (literally meaning the 'trail of faith'). The Muslim expansion comes to a halt as the martial energies of the Islamic forces are directed inwards.
- June 17 – Uthman ibn Affan is murdered at Medina after an 11-year reign. He is succeeded by Muhammad's cousin and son-in-law Ali ibn Abi-Talib, who becomes the fourth caliph of the Rashidun Caliphate. He makes Kufah (Iraq) his capital, but the succession is disputed.
- December 8 – Battle of the Camel: Rebel Arabs under Aisha (widow of Muhammad) begin a revolt against Ali. They are defeated at Basra, and Aisha is exiled to Medina. During the battle 10,000 people lose their lives, with each party bearing equal loss.
- Abdullah ibn Sa'ad, governor of Upper Egypt, dies after a 12-year regime in which he has defeated neighboring Nubia.

==== Asia ====
- Empress Saimei of Japan builds a new palace at Asuka (Nara Prefecture), because her former residence caught fire. This construction is called the "Mad Canal" by the people of that day, wasting the labor of tens of thousand workers and a large amount of money.

==== Polynesia ====
- September 24 – A total solar eclipse is observable from Easter Island. The next at this location would not occur until July 11, 2010.

=== By topic ===
==== Religion ====
- Li Xiăn, seventh son of the Chinese emperor Gao Zong, is made crown prince. His lavish palatial mansion in Chang'an is converted into a Daoist abbey during the Tang dynasty (approximate date).
- The Yasaka Shrine is constructed in the Gion district of Kyoto (Japan).

=== By place ===
==== Europe ====
- Grimoald the Elder, mayor of the palace of Austrasia, is deposed by Clovis II, king of Neustria. Clovis also captures Grimoald's son Childebert the Adopted, executing them both.
- Clovis II dies and is succeeded by his eldest son Chlothar III, age 5, who becomes king of Neustria and Burgundy, under the regency of his mother Balthild.

==== Arab Empire ====
- July 26 - July 28 – Battle of Siffin: Muslim forces under Ali ibn Abi-Talib fight an inconclusive battle against Mu'awiya I, on the banks of the Euphrates, near Raqqa (Syria).

==== Asia ====
- Tang campaigns against the Western Turks: Emperor Gao Zong dispatches a military campaign led by Su Dingfang. He annexes the Western Turkic Khaganate.
- Gao Zong commissions the pharmacology publication of an official materia medica, documenting the use of 833 different substances for medicinal purposes.

==== Americas ====
- In the course of the Second Tikal–Calakmul War, the Snake Lord (Yuknoom Ch'een II) makes a direct attack against Tikal itself, driving out its new ruler Nuun Ujol Chaak, and establishing Calakmul as the regional superpower. Bʼalaj Chan Kʼawiil, the one time heir apparent to rule Tikal, swears his allegiance to the new overlord.

=== By topic ===
==== Religion ====
- June 1 – Pope Eugene I dies at Rome after a reign of nearly 2½ years. He is succeeded by Vitalian as the 76th pope.
- Hilda, Anglo-Saxon abbess, founds a monastery at Streaneshalch, on the Yorkshire coast at Whitby (England).

=== By place ===
==== Byzantine Empire ====
- Emperor Constans II undertakes an expedition to the Balkan Peninsula, and defeats the Avars in Macedonia. He temporarily reasserts Byzantine rule, and resettles some of them in Anatolia to fight against the Rashidun Caliphate (approximate date).

==== Europe ====
- The confederation of Slavic tribes falls apart after the death of King Samo. A Slav principality is formed from the kingdom's remnants in Carinthia (modern Austria), and the Avars capture most of its territory in Hungary (approximate date).

==== Britain ====
- Battle of Peonnum: King Cenwalh and the Wessex Saxons make a push against Dumnonia (South West England). They are victorious at Penselwood in Somerset, and the Dumnonia-Wessex border is set at the River Parrett (approximate date).
- A revolt led by three Mercian noblemen (Immin, Eata, and Eadberht) installs Wulfhere (son of king Penda) as ruler of Mercia, and drives out the supporters of King Oswiu of Northumbria.

==== Asia ====
- The Chinese Buddhist monks Zhi Yu and Zhi You recreate several south-pointing chariots, for the Japanese prince Tenji. This is a 3rd-century device made by Ma Jun, and acts as a mechanical-driven directional-compass vehicle (according to the Nihon Shoki).
- Chinese forces defeat the Western Turkic Kaganate (Central Asia). The West kaganate becomes a vassal of the Tang dynasty. During the power vacuum, Turgesh tribes emerge as the leading power (approximate date).

=== By place ===
==== Byzantine Empire ====
- Arab–Byzantine War: Emperor Constans II signs a peace treaty with the Rashidun Caliphate. He uses the pause to strengthen his defences, and consolidates Byzantine control over Armenia. Constans establishes the themata, dividing territorial command in Anatolia.
- Constans II elevates his son Heraclius to the rank of co-emperor (Augustus), alongside his brother Tiberius.

==== Asia ====
- A Japanese embassy is sent to the Chinese Empire, and received in an audience by Emperor Gao Zong. The Tang dynasty is determined in the next year to take administrative measures in regard to Japan. The envoys are detained.

=== By topic ===
==== Religion ====
- March 17 – Gertrude of Nivelles, daughter of Pepin of Landen (mayor of the palace of Austrasia), requests on her deathbed a burial wearing a plain linen shroud. This is the traditional (pagan) practice of a 'furnished' grave.
- Leodegar, an opponent of Ebroin (mayor of the palace), is appointed bishop of Autun in Burgundy.

== Significant people ==
- Popes: Martin I, Eugene I, Vitalian
- Byzantine Emperor: Constans II

== Births ==
650

- Anastasia, Byzantine empress (approximate date)
- Dagobert II, king of Austrasia (approximate date)
- Frithuswith, Anglo-Saxon abbess (approximate date)
- Giles, Frankish abbot (approximate date)
- Jarir ibn Atiyah, Arab poet and satirist (approximate date)
- Sergius I, pope of Rome (approximate date)
- Shen Quanqi, Chinese poet and official (approximate date)
- Werburgh, Anglo-Saxon princess (approximate date)
- Yao Chong, chancellor of the Tang dynasty (d. 721)

652

- Chlothar III, king of Neustria and Burgundy (d. 673)
- Constantine IV, Byzantine emperor (d. 685)
- Li Hong, prince of the Tang dynasty (d. 675)

653

- Childeric II, king of the Franks (approximate date)
- Li Xian, prince of the Tang dynasty (d. 684)

654

- Takechi, Japanese prince (approximate date)
- Theuderic III, king of the Franks (d. 691)
- Princess Si of Anding, Princess of the Tang dynasty of China

655

- John VI, pope of Rome (d. 705)

656

- Hubertus, bishop of Liège (approximate date)
- Zhong Zong, emperor of the Tang dynasty (d. 710)

657

- Ansprand, king of the Lombards (approximate date)

658

- Willibrord, Anglo-Saxon missionary

659

- Ali ibn Husayn Zayn, great-grandson of Muhammad and Shia Imam
- Cædwalla, king of Wessex (approximate date)
- Fujiwara no Fuhito, Japanese statesman (d. 720)
- He Zhizhang, Chinese poet (approximate date)

== Deaths ==
650

- Candrakīrti, Indian Madhyamaka philosopher (approximate date)
- Chen Yueyi, empress of Northern Zhou (approximate date)
- Ferchar mac Connaid, king of Dál Riata (modern Scotland)
- Fursey, Irish missionary (approximate date)

651

- August 20 – Oswine, king of Deira (England)
- August 31 – Aidan, Irish-born bishop of Lindisfarne
- Braulio, bishop of Zaragoza (b. 590)
- Dayi Daoxin, Chán Buddhist patriarch (b. 580)
- Grasulf II, duke of Friuli (approximate date)
- Radoald, duke of Benevento (Italy)
- Yazdegard III, king of the Sassanid Empire
- Apranik, Sasanian female military commander.

652

- Abbas ibn Abd al-Muttalib, uncle of Muhammad (approximate date)
- Abdel Rahman ibn Awf, companion of Muhammad (approximate date)
- Abu Sufyan ibn Harb, Arabic leader (b. 560)
- Emmeram, bishop of Regensburg (approximate date)
- Itta of Metz, widow of Pippin of Landen (b. 592)
- Li Tai, prince of the Tang dynasty (b. 618)
- Olympius, exarch of Ravenna
- Rothari, king of the Lombards

653

- March 6 – Li Ke, prince of the Tang dynasty
- September 30 – Honorius, archbishop of Canterbury
- Abbas ibn Abd al-Muttalib, uncle of Muhammad (approximate date)
- Chen Shuozhen, Chinese rebel leader
- Chindasuinth, king of the Visigoths
- Marcán mac Tommáin, king of Uí Maine (Ireland)
- Plato, exarch of Ravenna
- Rodoald, king of the Lombards
- Romaric, Frankish nobleman
- Sigeberht I, king of Essex
- Talorc III, king of the Picts
- Theodelap, duke of Spoleto (approximate date)
- Zhang Xingcheng, chancellor of the Tang dynasty (b. 587)

654

- January 16 – Gao Jifu, chancellor of the Tang dynasty (b. 596)
- June 1 – Pyrrhus, patriarch of Constantinople
- November 24 – Kōtoku, emperor of Japan (b. 596)
- Anna, king of East Anglia (approximate date)
- Conall Cóel, high king of Ireland
- Dúnchad mac Conaing, king of Dál Riata (modern Scotland)
- Jindeok of Silla, queen of Silla
- Jurmin, Anglo-Saxon prince (approximate date)
- Takamuko no Kuromaro, Japanese diplomat
- Princess Si of Anding, Princess of the Tang dynasty of China

655

- September 16 – Pope Martin I
- November 15 – Æthelhere, king of East Anglia
- November 15 – Penda, king of Mercia
- Cadafael Cadomedd, king of Gwynedd
- Didier of Cahors, Frankish bishop
- Foillan, Irish missionary (approximate date)
- Loingsech mac Colmáin, king of Connacht (Ireland)
- Theodore Rshtuni, Armenian general
- Wang, empress of the Tang dynasty
- Xiao, concubine of Gao Zong

656

- June 20 – Uthman ibn Affan, Muslim Caliph (b. 577) (martyred)
- Abdullah ibn Sa'ad, Arab governor
- Crundmáel Erbuilc, king of the Uí Ceinnselaig (Ireland)
- Cui Dunli, general of the Tang dynasty (b. 596)
- Cynddylan, king of Pengwern (Wales)
- Li Daozong, prince of the Tang dynasty
- Peada, king of Mercia (Midlands)
- Sigebert III, king of Austrasia (or 660)
- Zubayr ibn al-Awwam, Arab general (b. 594) (martyred)

657

- June 2 – Pope Eugene I
- November 12 – Livinus, Irish apostle
- Ammar ibn Yasir, companion of Muhammad and Ali ibn Abi Talib (b. 570)
- Childebert the Adopted, king (usurper) of Austrasia
- Clovis II, king of Neustria and Burgundy (or 658)
- Grimoald the Elder, Mayor of the Palace (b. 616)
- Talorgan I, king of the Picts

658

- Cellach mac Máele Coba, high king of Ireland
- Chu Suiliang, chancellor of the Tang dynasty (b. 597)
- Clovis II, king of Neustria and Burgundy (or 657)
- Du Zhenglun, chancellor of the Tang dynasty
- Erchinoald, mayor of the Palace of Neustria
- Jajang, Korean Buddhist monk (b. 590)
- Judicael, high king of Domnonée
- Samo, king of the Slavs (Carinthia)
- Yuchi Gong, general of the Tang dynasty (b. 585)

659

- March 17 – Gertrude of Nivelles, Frankish abbess (b. c.628)
- November 3 – Denha I of Tikrit, Syriac Orthodox Grand Metropolitan of the East.
- Bavo of Ghent, Frankish nobleman and saint (b. 622)
- Han Yuan, chancellor of the Tang dynasty (b. 606)
- Ishoyahb III, patriarch of the Church of the East
- Liu Shi, chancellor of the Tang dynasty
- Zhangsun Wuji, chancellor of the Tang dynasty
