= 637 =

Calendar year

637 in various calendars
Gregorian calendar	637; DCXXXVII
Ab urbe condita	1390
Armenian calendar	86; ԹՎ ՁԶ
Assyrian calendar	5387
Balinese saka calendar	558–559
Bengali calendar	43–44
Berber calendar	1587
Buddhist calendar	1181
Burmese calendar	−1
Byzantine calendar	6145–6146
Chinese calendar	丙申年 (Fire Monkey); 3334 or 3127 — to — 丁酉年 (Fire Rooster); 3335 or 3128
Coptic calendar	353–354
Discordian calendar	1803
Ethiopian calendar	629–630
Hebrew calendar	4397–4398
- Hindu calendars
Vikram Samvat	693–694
Shaka Samvat	558–559
Kali Yuga	3737–3738
Holocene calendar	10637
Iranian calendar	15–16
Islamic calendar	15–16
Japanese calendar	N/A
Javanese calendar	527–528
Julian calendar	637; DCXXXVII
Korean calendar	2970
Minguo calendar	1275 before ROC 民前1275年
Nanakshahi calendar	−831
Seleucid era	948/949 AG
Thai solar calendar	1179–1180
Tibetan calendar	མེ་ཕོ་སྤྲེ་ལོ་ (male Fire-Monkey); 763 or 382 or −390 — to — མེ་མོ་བྱ་ལོ་ (female Fire-Bird); 764 or 383 or −389

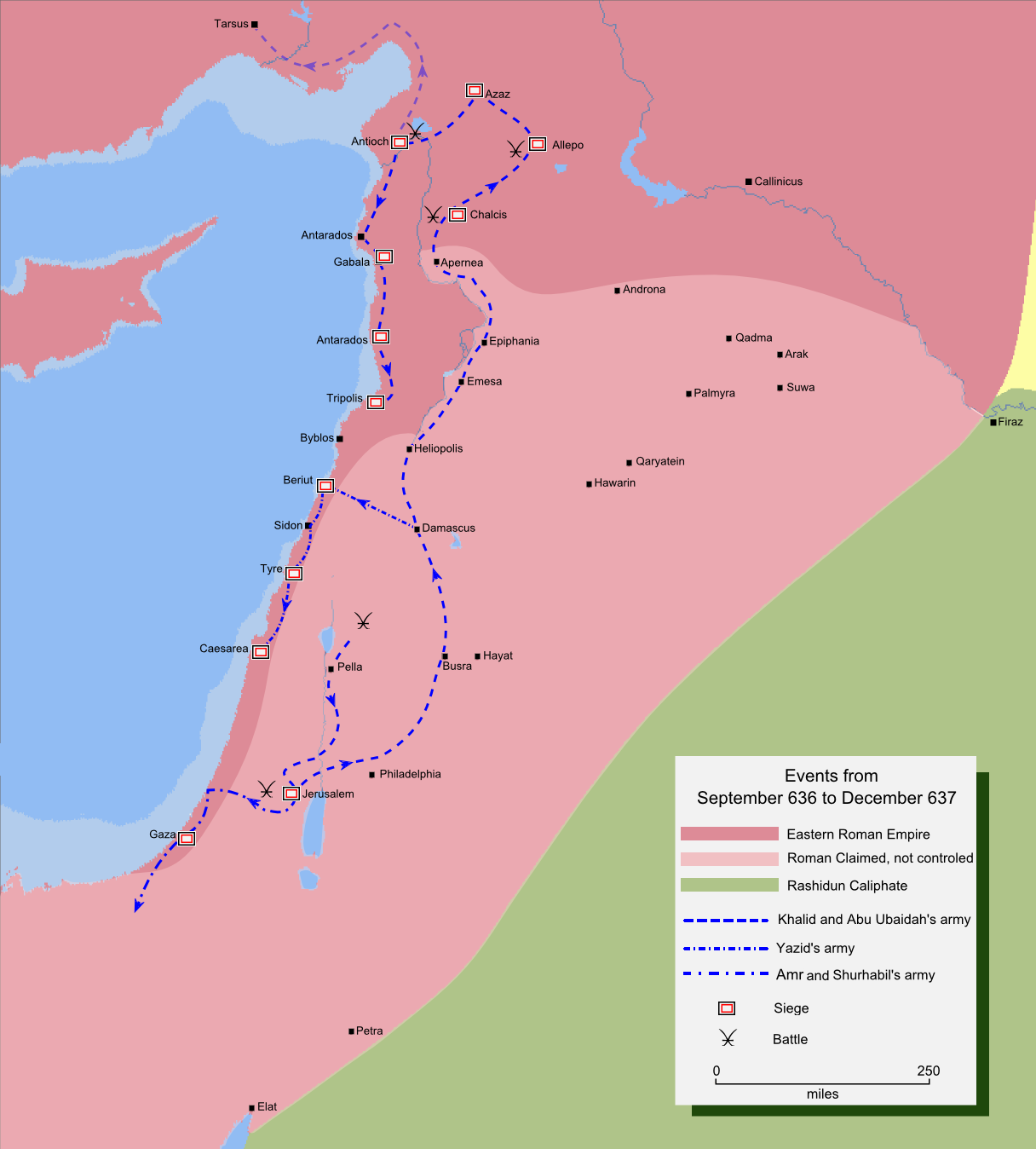
The Muslim invasion of Northern Syria

Year 637 (DCXXXVII) was a common year starting on Wednesday of the Julian calendar. The denomination 637 for this year has been used since the early medieval period, when the Anno Domini calendar era became the prevalent method in Europe for naming years.

== Events ==
=== By place ===
==== Britain ====
- June 24 – Battle of Mag Rath: King Oswald of Northumbria sends troops to Ireland, to assist Domnall Brecc King of Dál Riata in his alliance with King Congal Cáech of Ulaid against Domnall mac Áedo High King of Ireland, during the Irish dynastic wars. Domnall Brecc, Congal and their forces are defeated near Moira. At the Mull of Kintyre (southwest Scotland), Domnall mac Áedo's fleet destroys Domnall Brecc's naval force of Dál Riata.

==== Persia ====
- March – Siege of Ctesiphon: The Rashidun army (15,000 men) under Saʿd ibn Abi Waqqas occupies the Persian capital of Ctesiphon, after a two-month siege. King Yazdegerd III flees with the imperial treasure eastward into Media. Muslim forces conquer the Persian provinces as far as Khuzestan (modern Iran).
- Battle of Jalula: Muslim Arabs defeat the Persian forces (20,000 men) under Farrukhzad at the Diyala River. The cities Tikrit and Mosul are captured, completing the conquest of Mesopotamia. The region west of the Zagros Mountains is annexed by the Rashidun Caliphate.

==== Arabian Empire ====
- April – Siege of Jerusalem: The Rashidun army (20,000 men), led by 'Amr ibn al-'As, conquers Jerusalem after a six-month siege. The Byzantine garrison surrenders to Caliph Umar I, who is invited by Sophronius, patriarch of Jerusalem, to pray in the Church of the Holy Sepulchre. Umar declines, fearing that accepting the invitation might endanger the church's status, and turn the Christian holy site into a mosque.
- Battle of Hazir: Muslim Arab forces (17,000 men) under Khalid ibn al-Walid defeat the Byzantine army near Qinnasrin (Northern Syria). The cities of Beirut and Tyre are captured by Yazid ibn Abi Sufyan after a short siege.
- October – Siege of Aleppo: Muslim Arabs under Khalid ibn al-Walid conquer the Byzantine stronghold Aleppo; the large walled city surrenders after a four-month siege. A column of troops under Malik al-Ashtar is sent to take Azaz.
- Battle of the Iron Bridge: Rashidun forces under Khalid ibn al-Walid defeat the Byzantine army and Christian Arabs near Antioch, at the Orontes River. It marks the complete annexation of Syria into the Rashidun Caliphate.

==== Asia ====
- Chang'an, capital of the Tang dynasty (China), becomes the largest city of the world, taking the lead from Ctesiphon, capital of Persia.
- Queen Seondeok of Silla (Korea) builds an astronomical observatory near Gyeongju (Cheomseongdae), one of the oldest in East Asia.
- King Songtsän Gampo builds the first palace on the site of the Potala Palace in Lhasa (Tibet).

=== By topic ===
==== Religion ====
- The Muslims replace Zoroastrianism with Islam in Mesopotamia (later Iraq); they do not force their conquered subjects to embrace the Islamic faith, but they do require acceptance of the Quran as the doctrine of divine teaching, and will oblige their subjects to learn Arabic (approximate date).

== Births ==
People who are the subjects of Wikipedia articles can be found here.

== Deaths ==
- Andreas of Caesarea, bishop and writer (b. 563)
- Congal Cáech, high king of Dál nAraidi (Ireland)
- John Athalarichos, illegitimate son of Heraclius
- Maria al-Qibtiyya, concubine of Muhammad
- Menas, Byzantine general
- Mo Chua, Irish bishop and founder of Balla
- Mo Chutu, Irish abbot and founder of Lismore Abbey
- Rostam Farrokhzād, Persian general (or 636)
- Wen Yanbo, chancellor of the Tang dynasty (b. 575)
