= 654 =

Calendar year

654 in various calendars
- Gregorian calendar: 654; DCLIV
- Ab urbe condita: 1407
- Armenian calendar: 103; ԹՎ ՃԳ
- Assyrian calendar: 5404
- Balinese saka calendar: 575–576
- Bengali calendar: 60–61
- Berber calendar: 1604
- Buddhist calendar: 1198
- Burmese calendar: 16
- Byzantine calendar: 6162–6163
- Chinese calendar: 癸丑年 (Water Ox); 3351 or 3144 — to — 甲寅年 (Wood Tiger); 3352 or 3145
- Coptic calendar: 370–371
- Discordian calendar: 1820
- Ethiopian calendar: 646–647
- Hebrew calendar: 4414–4415
- Hindu calendars
- Vikram Samvat: 710–711
- Shaka Samvat: 575–576
- Kali Yuga: 3754–3755
- Holocene calendar: 10654
- Iranian calendar: 32–33
- Islamic calendar: 33–34
- Japanese calendar: Hakuchi 5 (白雉５年)
- Javanese calendar: 545–546
- Julian calendar: 654; DCLIV
- Korean calendar: 2987
- Minguo calendar: 1258 before ROC 民前1258年
- Nanakshahi calendar: −814
- Seleucid era: 965/966 AG
- Thai solar calendar: 1196–1197
- Tibetan calendar: ཆུ་མོ་གླང་ལོ་ (female Water-Ox); 780 or 399 or −373 — to — ཤིང་ཕོ་སྟག་ལོ་ (male Wood-Tiger); 781 or 400 or −372

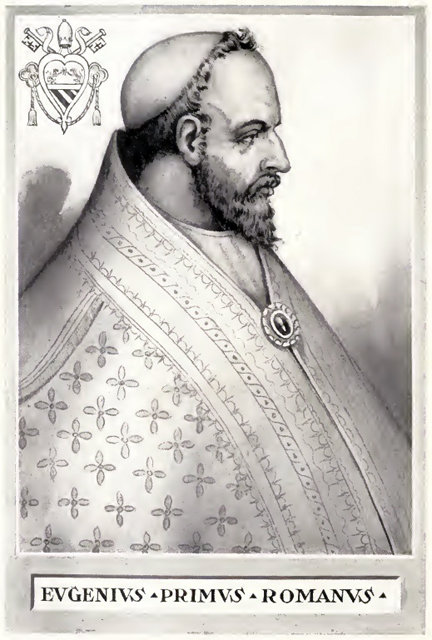
Pope Eugene I (654–657)

Year 654 (DCLIV) was a common year starting on Wednesday of the Julian calendar. The denomination 654 for this year has been used since the early medieval period, when the Anno Domini calendar era became the prevalent method in Europe for naming years.

== Events ==
=== By place ===
==== Byzantine Empire ====
- Emperor Constans II appoints his son Constantine IV, age 2, co-emperor (Augustus). He is too young to rule as monarch of the Byzantine Empire, and his title remains a given name.

==== Europe ====
- King Recceswinth draws up the Liber Judiciorum at Toledo, a Visigothic code based on Roman law, that establishes equality between Goths and Hispano-Romans without regard to racial or cultural differences.

==== Britain ====
- King Penda of Mercia defeats the East Anglians at Bulcamp near Blythburgh (Suffolk). King Anna of East Anglia and his son Jurmin are killed.
- Æthelhere succeeds his brother Anna as king of East Anglia, and accepts Mercian overlordship (approximate date).

==== Arabian Caliphate ====
- Muawiyah, governor of Syria, stations a large garrison on Cyprus. He conquers the Greek island of Kos in the Dodecanese.
- Arab invaders cross the Oxus River, in what later will be Uzbekistan. Nomadic Turkic tribes continue to control Central Asia.

==== Asia ====
- November 24 – Emperor Kōtoku dies after a 9-year reign; Kōgyoku (his elder sister) is restored on the throne under the name Saimei.
- Takamuko no Kuromaro, a Japanese diplomat, is sent to the Tang dynasty again, but dies upon his arrival in Chang'an.
- Nakatomi no Kamatari, the inner minister (naidaijin) of Japan, is granted the Shikwan (the Purple Cap). ^{[Ambiguous; Significance of this is unclear]}
- Muyeol becomes king of the Korean kingdom of Silla.

=== By topic ===
==== Religion ====
- August 10 – The exiled Pope Martin I is deposed, and succeeded by Eugene I, as the 75th pope of the Roman Catholic Church. On September 17, Martin is taken to Constantinople and publicly humiliated, for having condemned the Byzantine Emperor Constans II in 649.
- Philibert, Frankish abbot, receives a gift from King Clovis II of Neustria, and founds Jumièges Abbey in Normandy.

== Births ==
- Takechi, Japanese prince (approximate date)
- Theuderic III, king of the Franks (d. 691)
- Princess Si of Anding, Princess of the Tang dynasty of China

== Deaths ==
- January 16 – Gao Jifu, chancellor of the Tang dynasty (b. 596)
- June 1 – Pyrrhus, patriarch of Constantinople
- November 24 – Kōtoku, emperor of Japan (b. 596)
- Anna, king of East Anglia (approximate date)
- Conall Cóel, high king of Ireland
- Dúnchad mac Conaing, king of Dál Riata (modern Scotland)
- Jindeok of Silla, queen of Silla
- Jurmin, Anglo-Saxon prince (approximate date)
- Takamuko no Kuromaro, Japanese diplomat
- Princess Si of Anding, Princess of the Tang dynasty of China
