= 629 =

Calendar year

629 in various calendars
Gregorian calendar	629; DCXXIX
Ab urbe condita	1382
Armenian calendar	78; ԹՎ ՀԸ
Assyrian calendar	5379
Balinese saka calendar	550–551
Bengali calendar	35–36
Berber calendar	1579
Buddhist calendar	1173
Burmese calendar	−9
Byzantine calendar	6137–6138
Chinese calendar	戊子年 (Earth Rat); 3326 or 3119 — to — 己丑年 (Earth Ox); 3327 or 3120
Coptic calendar	345–346
Discordian calendar	1795
Ethiopian calendar	621–622
Hebrew calendar	4389–4390
- Hindu calendars
Vikram Samvat	685–686
Shaka Samvat	550–551
Kali Yuga	3729–3730
Holocene calendar	10629
Iranian calendar	7–8
Islamic calendar	7–8
Japanese calendar	N/A
Javanese calendar	519–520
Julian calendar	629; DCXXIX
Korean calendar	2962
Minguo calendar	1283 before ROC 民前1283年
Nanakshahi calendar	−839
Seleucid era	940/941 AG
Thai solar calendar	1171–1172
Tibetan calendar	ས་ཕོ་བྱི་བ་ལོ་ (male Earth-Rat); 755 or 374 or −398 — to — ས་མོ་གླང་ལོ་ (female Earth-Ox); 756 or 375 or −397

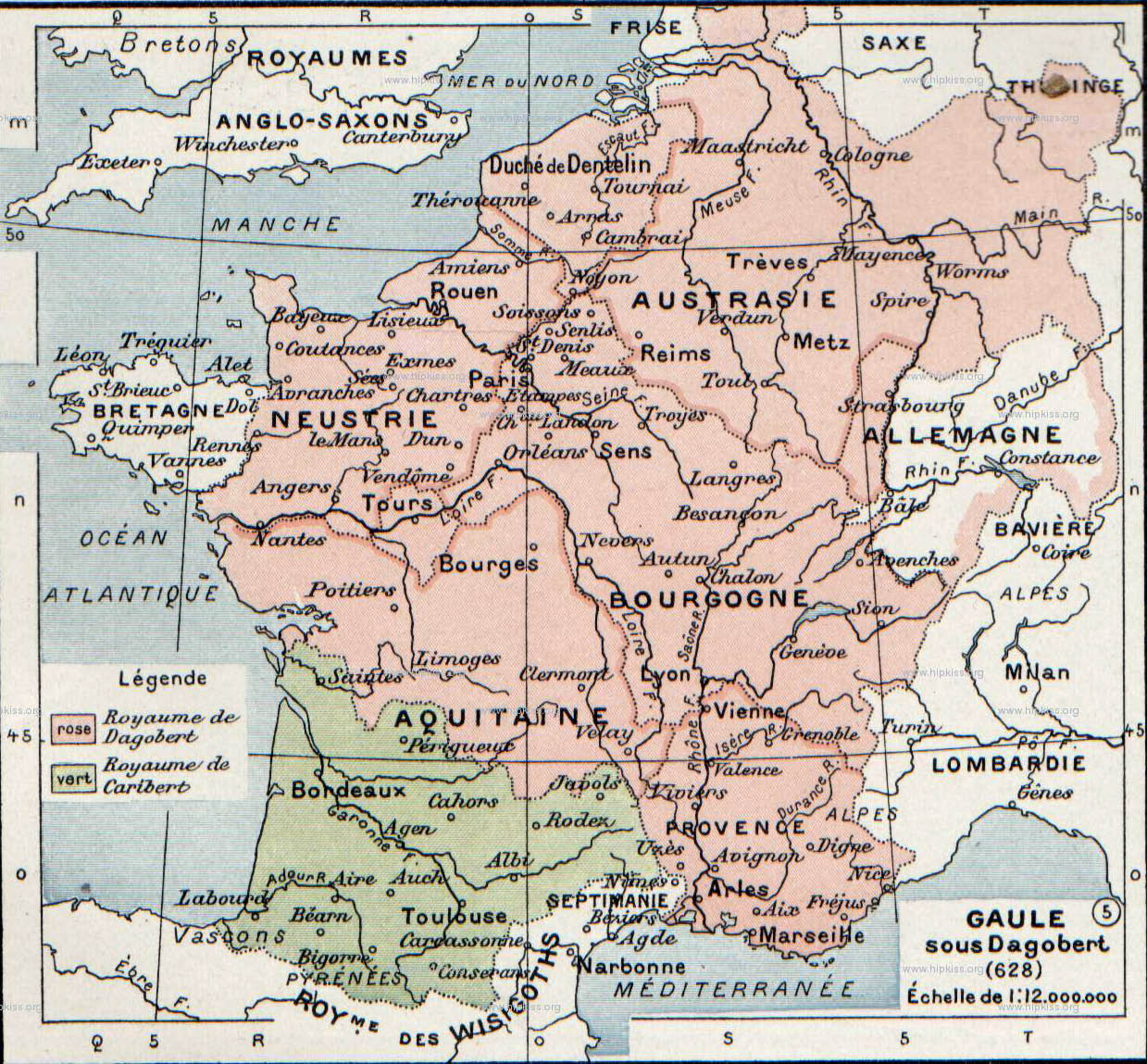
Frankish Kingdom ruled by King Dagobert I

Year 629 (DCXXIX) was a common year starting on Sunday of the Julian calendar. The denomination 629 for this year has been used since the early medieval period, when the Anno Domini calendar era became the prevalent method in Europe for naming years.

== Events ==
=== By place ===
==== Byzantine Empire ====
- September – Jerusalem is reconquered by the Byzantines (after 15 years of occupation), from the Persian Empire.
- September 14 – Emperor Heraclius enters Constantinople in triumph. In a ceremonial parade, accompanied by the True Cross, he is welcomed by the citizens and his son Heraclius Constantine.
- Heraclius styles himself as Basileus, Greek word for "sovereign", and takes the ancient title of "King of Kings", after his victory over Persia.

==== Europe ====
- King Chlothar II dies after a 16-year reign, and is succeeded by his son Dagobert I. Counseled by Bishop Arnulf of Metz and Pepin of Landen (Mayor of the Palace), he moves the capital to Paris.
- Charibert II, half-brother of Dagobert I, becomes king of Aquitaine (Southern France), and establishes his capital at Toulouse. Charibert's realm also includes Agen, Cahors, and Périgueux.

==== Britain ====
- Battle of Fid Eoin: King Connad Cerr of Dál Riata is killed by the Dál nAraidi of the over-kingdom of Ulaid in north-eastern Ireland (approximate date).

==== Arabia ====
- Summer – Muhammad, Islamic unifies all nomadic tribes of the Arabian Peninsula, converts them to Islam and prepares an expedition against the Jews.
- May–June – Battle of Khaybar: Muhammad and his followers defeat the Jews living in the fortified oasis at Khaybar, located 150 kilometers from Medina.
- September – Battle of Mu'tah: The Muslims fail to take the lands east of the Jordan River, and are pushed back near Mu'tah by the Ghassanids.

==== Asia ====
- April 27 – Shahrbaraz usurps the throne of the Sasanian Empire from Ardashir III, but is himself deposed forty days later by nobility in favour of Borandukht. Khosrow III briefly rules Khorasan in the confusion, until he is assassinated by the governor of the province.
- Winter – Emperor Taizong of the Tang dynasty launches a campaign against the Eastern Turkic Khaganate (Central Asia).
- Emperor Jomei succeeds his great aunt, empress Suiko, and ascends to the throne of Japan.

==== Americas ====
- The Maya military outpost of Dos Pilas (Guatemala) is founded, in order to control trade routes in the Petexbatún region. Bʼalaj Chan Kʼawiil is installed as its leader by his father, K'inich Muwaan Jol II, the ruler of Tikal.

=== By topic ===
==== Religion ====
- Xuanzang, Chinese Buddhist monk, sets out for India from the Tang dynasty capital Chang'an on a pilgrimage.
- Muhammad meets Al-Khansa', Arabic poet, and converts her to Islam.

== Births ==
- Dōshō, Japanese Buddhist monk (d. 700)

== Deaths ==
- Chlothar II, king of the Franks
- Conall mac Máele Dúib, king of Uí Maine (Ireland)
- Connad Cerr, king of Dál Riata (Scotland)
- Eochaid Buide, king of Dál Riata
- Eustace of Luxeuil, Frankish abbot
- Jafar ibn Abi Talib, companion of Muhammad and older brother of Ali ibn Abi Talib
- Pei Ji, chancellor of the Tang dynasty (b. 570)
- Kinana ibn al-Rabi, Jewish leader
