= Buile Shuibhne =

Medieval Irish tale

- The Madness of Sweeney
- by Unknown
- Translator: James G. O’Keeffe; Seamus Heaney
- Written: 12th century or later
- Country: Tyrconnell
- Language: Early Modern Irish
- Subject: Madness
- Genre: Medieval romance
- Form: Epic poem
- Meter: 11 Irish meters are recorded, mostly debide
- Media type: Manuscript
- Lines: 2,386
- Preceded by: Cath Maige Rátha

Buile Shuibhne (Note: Alternate spellings are ''Buile Suibne, Shuibni, Suibne; also appears as Buile Suibhne Geilt, 'Frenzy of Sweeney of the Madman') (Irish pronunciation: [ˈbˠɪlʲə ˈhɪvʲnʲə], BWILL-uh HIV-n'yuh, The Madness of Suibhne, The Madness of Sweeney, Sweeney Astray or Suibhne's Frenzy) is a medieval Irish tale about Suibhne mac Colmáin ('Suibne son of Colmán,' Anglicised as Sweeney), king of the Dál nAraidi, who was driven insane by the curse of Saint Rónán Finn. The insanity makes Suibhne leave the Battle of Mag Rath and begin a life of wandering (which earns him the nickname Suibne Geilt, "Suibhne the Madman"). He dies under the refuge of St. Moling.

The tale is sometimes seen as an instalment within a three-text cycle, continuing on from Fled Dúin na nGéd ('The Feast of Dún na nGéd') and Cath Maige Rátha ('Battle of Moira').

Suibhne's name appears as early as the ninth century in a law tract (Book of Aicill), but Buile Shuibhne did not take its current form until the twelfth century. Ó Béarra (2014) includes a detailed analysis of the language and date of the text. He contends that the text in its final form is not as old as generally presumed but should be dated to the early thirteenth century.

== Suibhne's identity ==
The identity of Suibhne is a very convoluted matter as several texts mention different Suibhnes in regards with the Battle of Mag Rath. Buile Shuibhne specifies Suibhne as the son of Colman Cuar and as the king of Dál nAraidi in Ulster in Ireland (in particular in the areas of present-day county Down and county Antrim). This particular Suibhne son of Colman's name can also be found in the Annals of Tigernach and the Book of Lismore. The Annals of Tigernach state Suibhne, son of Colmán, died in the Battle of Mag Rath, making Buile seem a fanciful imagining of a dead warrior. Historical records of Dál nAraidi do exist. It was a historical kingdom inhabited by the Cruthin. However the king lists of Dál nAraidi in the Book of Leinster fail to mention any Suibhne son of Colmán Cuar as king, and identifies Congal Claen as king of Dál nAraidi during this time. James G. O’Keeffe has hypothesized a possible scenario where Suibhne might have been elected by the Cruithin to act as regent in the midst of King Congal's exile.

== Text ==
There are three manuscripts, B (Royal Irish Academy, B iv i), 1671–4; K (Royal Irish Academy, 23 K 44), 1721–2; and L (Brussels, 3410), 1629, a condensed version in the hand of Mícheál Ó Cléirigh. The text can be dated to broadly from 1200 to 1500 on linguistic grounds, but John O'Donovan asserted the writer must have lived before 1197 when the last chieftain of Tir Connail died who was descended from Domnall mac Áedo, since the work is intended to flatter this monarchic dynasty.

== Plot ==
=== The saint's curse ===
In the legend, while Saint Rónán Finn ('Rónán the Fair') was marking boundaries for a new church, the sound of his bell reached Suibhne's ear. Suibhne, upon learning that this was church-making activity on his grounds, rushed out to expel Rónán from his territory. His wife, Eorann, tried to detain him by grabbing his cloak, which unraveled, leaving Suibhne to exit the house stark naked. Suibhne grabbed Ronan's psalter and threw it into the lake, and seized the saint by the hand and started to drag him away. But Suibhne was interrupted by a messenger from Congal Claen requesting aid in the Battle of Mag Rath (near modern Moira, AD 637).

The next day, the psalter was returned unharmed by an otter that fetched it from the lake. The saint laid a curse upon Suibhne, condemning him to wander and fly around the world naked, and to meet his death by spear-point. In the ongoing war, St. Rónán had mediated a truce to last from each evening until morning, but Suibhne habitually broke this by killing during the hours when combat was not permitted.

One day, Bishop Rónán and his psalmists were on their round blessing the troops. Suibhne too received the sprinkling of holy water, but taking this as a taunt, he killed one of the bishop's psalmists with a spear, and cast another at Ronan himself. The weapon pierced a hole in Ronan's bell (hanging on his breast), and the broken-off shaft hurled in the air. At this, Ronan repeated the same curse: that Suibhne will wander like a bird, much as the spear-shaft, perch on tree branches at the sound of the bell, and die by the spear just as he had killed the monk. When battle resumed, the tremendous noise of the armies clashing drove Suibhne insane. His hands were numbed, his weapons fell, and he began to tread ever so lightly as a bird levitating in the air. (It is revealed much later on that like a bird, feathers had grown on him.)

=== The madness and wandering ===
The deranged Suibhne then left the battlefield, reaching a forest called Ros Bearaigh, in Glenn Earcain (Note: Ros Bearaigh may be another forest in the vicinity of Ros Earcain (Rasharkin, County Antrim), which occurs as a separate location in this tale, O'Keeffe 1913, notes, p.162 (to §12, p. 15), 164 (to §17, p.23), 167 (to §35, p.51)) and perched on a yew tree. He was discovered by his kinsman Aongus the Fat, who was making his retreat from battle. Suibhne fled to Cell Riagain (Note: Kilrean, O'Keeffe 1913, notes, p.162) in Tir Conaill, alighting on another tree. There he was surrounded by the forces of Domnall mac Áedo, which was the side Suibhne and his Dál nAraidi kinsmen were warring against. The victorious Domnall nevertheless praised and pitied Suibhne and offered him gifts, but the madman would not comply.

Suibhne went to his home territory of Glenn Bolcáin, (Note: Possibly Glenbuck, near Rasharkin, Mackillop 1998, "Bolcáin, Glenn", p. 47, citing Gearóid Mac Eoin (1962), "Gleann Bolcáin agus Gleann na nGealt" in Béaloideas 30; O'Keeffe could not pinpoint it but also believed it to be somewhere in N. Antrim, O'Keeffe 1913, p. 164.) wandered seven years throughout Ireland, and returned to Glenn Bolcain, which was where his fortress and dwelling stood, and a celebrated valley of madmen. Suibhne's movement was now being tracked by his kinsman Loingsechan, who had successfully taken the madman into custody three times before. Loingsechan in his millhouse had the opportunity to capture Suibhne, but the attempt failed, and he had to await another chance. Suibhne then paid a visit to his wife, who was living with another man, a contender for Suibhne's kingship. Eorann maintained she would rather be with Suibhne, but he told her to remain with her new husband. An army stormed in, but Suibhne eluded capture.

Suibhne then returned to the yew tree at Ros Bearaigh, the same tree he went to when he first developed his madness, but when Eorann came to deceive and capture him, he moved away to another tree in Ros Ercain. However, his whereabouts were discovered, and Loingsechan coaxed him out of the tree, tricking him with the false news that his entire family had perished. Loingsechan brought Suibhne back to normal life and restored his sanity, but, while he was recuperating, a local woman called the 'mill-hag' (cailleach an mhuilinn) taunted him into a leaping contest. As they leapt, the noise of a hunting party returned Suibhne to madness. The mill-hag eventually fell from her leap and was dashed to pieces. Since she was Loingsechan's mother-in-law, this meant that Suibhne could not return to Dál nAraidi without facing vengeance.

Suibhne subsequently wandered various parts of Ireland, into Scotland and western England. He went from Roscommon to Slieve Aughty, Slieve Mis, Slieve Bloom mountain ranges; (Note: Names of mountain ranges in Munster, except O'Keeffe believes Slieve Mish is not meant here, but rather Slemish in Ulster.) Inismurray island; the Cave of St. Donnan of Eigg, an island in the Scottish Inner Hebrides; then tarried for a month and a half in "Carrick Alastair" (Ailsa Craig off Scotland). He reached Britain and befriended a Fer Caille (Man of the Wood), who was another madman, and they spent an entire year together. The Briton met his predestined death by drowning in a waterfall.

=== Death according to prophecy ===
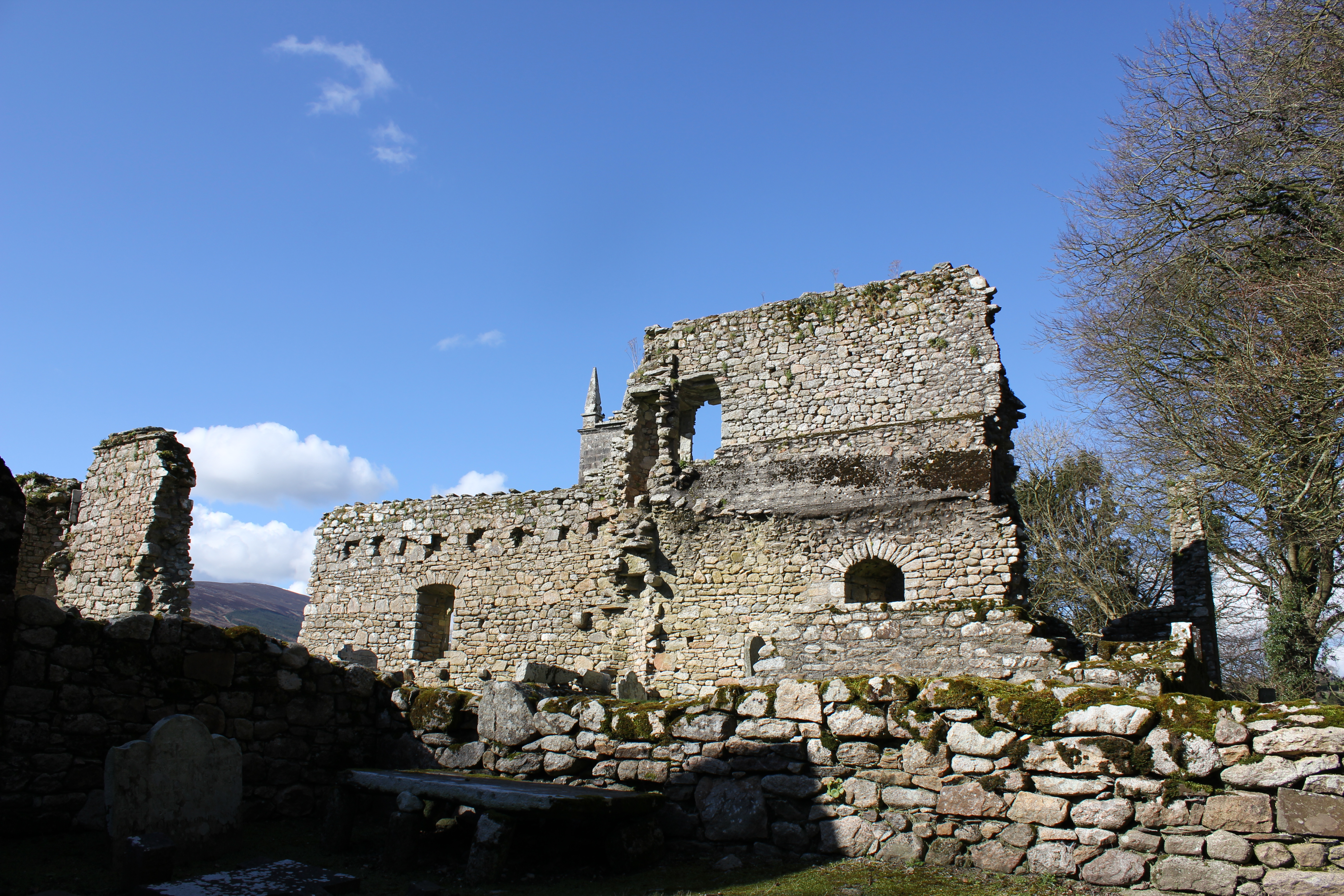
Remains of the monastery at Teach Moling

"Fly through the air like the shaft of his spear and that he might die of a spear cast like the cleric whom he had slain."

Suibhne then returned to Ireland, to his home dominion of Glen Bocain. He visited his wife Eorann again but refused to go in the house for fear of confinement. Eorann then told him to leave, never to return, because the sight of him was an embarrassment to all. But after a while, Suibhne regained his lucidity and made his resolve to go back to Dál nAraidi, whatever judgment might befall him. St. Ronan learned of this and prayed to God to hinder Suibhne. Suibhne was haunted by headless cadavers and detached heads at Sliabh Fuaid.

Eventually, Suibhne arrived at "The House of St. Moling", i.e. Teach Moling (St Mullin's in County Carlow), and Moling harbored him after hearing the madman's story. It might be noted that earlier, Suibhne had sung a stave predicting this place to be the place where he would meet his demise, and likewise, the Saint also knew this to be the madman's resting place. As Suibhne attended Moling's vespers, the priest instructed a parish woman employed as his cook to provide the madman with a meal (collation), in the form of daily milk. She did so by emptying milk into a hole she made with her foot in the cow dung. However, her husband (Moling's herder) believed malicious hearsay about the two having a tryst, and in a fit of jealousy, thrust a spear into Suibhne while he was drinking from the hole. Thus Suibhne died in the manner prescribed by Ronan, but received his sacrament from Moling, "as eric".

== Literary style ==
The poetry in the story of Suibhne is rich and accomplished, and the story itself of the mad and exiled king who composes verse as he travels has held the imagination of poets since then. At every stop in his flight, Suibhne pauses to give a poem on the location and his plight, and his descriptions of the countryside and nature, as well as his pathos, are central to the development of the text. Ó Béarra (2014) includes a detailed analysis of some of the poetry.

== Translations and adaptations ==
Many poets have invoked Suibhne (most often under the English version of his name, Sweeney) – most notably in Seamus Heaney's translation of the work into English, which he entitled Sweeney Astray. The author Flann O'Brien incorporated much of the story of Buile Shuibhne into his comic novel At Swim-Two-Birds, whose title is the English translation of the place name 'Snámh dá én' in the tale. Another version from the Irish text, titled The Poems of Sweeny, Peregrine, was published by the Irish poet Trevor Joyce.

Artist Cliodhna Cussen illustrated and adapted a version of the story for Clódhanna Teoranta in 1976. The book was called Buile Shuibhne.

A modern Irish version of Buile Shuibhne was prepared by Seán Ó Sé and published in 2010 by Coiscéim. This was the first time that the full original text was made available in modern Irish.

Sweeney also appears as a character in Neil Gaiman's novel American Gods and is portrayed by Pablo Schreiber in its TV adaptation. In the TV adaptation, Ibis, saying that "stories are truer than the truth," suggests that Sweeney is also Lugh, the Irish multi-skilled god of lightning, crafts and culture. However, Sweeney remembers his past as Buile Shuibhne, and denies that he is Lugh. Although, he begrudgingly remembers episodes of Lugh's life such as the slaying of One-Eyed Balor of the Fomorians

A contemporary version of the legend by poet Patricia Monaghan explores Sweeney as an archetype of the warrior suffering from "Soldier's Heart".

W. D. Snodgrass introduces his poem Heart's Needle with a reference to The Madness of Suibhne.

Irish poet and playwright Paula Meehan loosely based her 1997 drama Mrs. Sweeney on the Sweeney legend. Set in an inner-city Dublin flat complex called The Maria Goretti Mansions (recalling the factual Fatima Mansions), the play examines what life must have been like for Sweeney's wife; as Meehan states, "I wondered what it must have been like to be his woman." The play charts the trials and tribulations of Lil Sweeney's life in the Maria Goretti flats as she deals with crime, poverty, unemployment, drug abuse, and tries to come to terms with the premature death of her daughter Chrisse, a heroin addict who died a year before the action starts from an AIDS related illness. Lil's husband, Sweeney, is a pigeon fancier who, upon discovering that all his pigeons have been killed, retreats into a bird-like state.

Irish composer Frank Corcoran wrote a series of works between 1996 and 2003 around the tale. This includes the choral work Buile Suibhne / Mad Sweeney (1996, after Heaney), the electro-acoustic composition Sweeney's Vision (1997), and the chamber work Sweeney's Smithereens (2000). French writer Pierre Michon retells the story of Suibhne's levity in his 1997 collection Mythologies d'hiver.

In the 1999 young adult fantasy novel The Stones Are Hatching by Geraldine McCaughrean, Mad Sweeney is portrayed as having been traumatised by his experience fighting in the Napoleonic Wars.

"Shivna" from Riverdance is a ballet and choral piece based on the story of Mad Sweeney.

== See also ==
- Cycle of the Kings, a wider grouping of contemporary narratives
- Magheralin, a present-day village at the site of the church of Ronan Finn
- Woodwose
