= Cellach mac Máele Coba =

Cellach mac Máele Coba (died 658) was an Irish king and is said to have been High King of Ireland.

Cellach was the son of Máel Coba mac Áedo (died 615) and belonged to the Cenél Conaill branch of the northern Uí Néill. According to the Irish annals derived from the Chronicle of Ireland, he may have been High King, jointly with his brother Conall Cóel, following the death of his uncle Domnall mac Áedo in 642. The Annals of Ulster for 643 say:

Here there is doubt as to who reigned after Domnall. Some historiographers say that four kings, namely Cellach and Conall Cóel and the two sons of Áed Sláine, namely Diarmait and Blathmac, ruled in shared reigns.

All four putative successors to Domnall had been his allies at the great Battle of Mag Rath in 637, where Congal Cáech was defeated and the authority of the Uí Néill re-established, and it is not implausible that all four ruled together. He ruled from 643-654. The king lists have Cellach and Conall reigning before Diarmait and Blathmac. Both Cellach and Conall are omitted from the earliest king list—a late 7th century poem called Baile Chuinn.

In 650, they successfully ended a challenge to their authority in the north by defeating and killing their cousin Óengus mac Domnaill at the Battle of Dún Cremthainn. Conall Cóel was killed by Diarmait in 654 while Cellach died in 658, perhaps at Bru na Bóinne. It is possible Cellach had been captured by Diarmait in 654 and died a prisoner.

His daughter Cacht ingen Cellaig married Máel Dúin mac Máele Fithrich (died 681), King of Ailech.
