= Battle of Fid Eoin =

Battle in 629 or 630

Date	629 or 630
Location	Unidentified site in the over-kingdom of Ulaid in north-eastern Ireland
Result	Victory for the Uí Chóelbad

Belligerents
Uí Chóelbad of Dál nAraidi	Latharna and Dál Riata

Commanders and leaders
Máel Caích	Connad Cerr †; Díucaill mac Eochaid †

Strength
Unknown	Unknown

Casualties and losses
~Unknown casualties	~Unknown casualties

The Battle of Fid Eoin (modern Irish: Feadha Eoin, possibly meaning "Owen's wood") was fought in early medieval Ireland between the kingdoms of Dál Riata and Dál nAraidi in either 629 or 630. The forces of Dál Riata were led by their king Connad Cerr, whilst the Dál nAraidi were led by Máel Caích, brother of Congal Cáech who was the king of the Dál nAraidi and the over-kingdom of Ulaid. The result of the battle was a decisive defeat of the Dál Riata.

== Background ==
The battle arose out of an attempt by Connad Cerr, who had succeeded to the Dál Riata kingship only three months before, to interfere in an internal dispute amongst the Dál nAraidi. Connad sought to aid his ally, Díucaill mac Eochaid, who was king of the Dál nAraidi petty-kingdom of Latharna, against that of the Uí Chóelbad of Magh Line, on what may have been a battle over the kingship of Dál nAraidi.

It was a significant battle that resulted in a devastating defeat of the Dál Riata with the death of Connad Cerr as well as of Rigullon and Fáelbe who were two grand-sons of his predecessor Áedán mac Gabráin. Díucaill mac Eochaid also fell as well as according to one chronicle Osric son of Aelfric, a Saxon prince, possibly of Bernicia. A contingent of Connad Cerr's forces that came from Kintyre in Scottish Dál Riata were also decimated.

== Aftermath ==
In the aftermath of the battle of Fid Eoin, Domnall Brecc, grand-son of Áedán mac Gabráin, ascended to the kingship of Dál Riata. Domnall Brecc, possibly in an attempt to secure what was left of Dál Riata's possessions in Ireland and to prevent further incursions from the Uí Chóelbad of Dál nAraidi, accepted Congal Cáech's overtures of an alliance. This meant abandoning the previous alliance with the Dál nAraidi's foes, the Cenél Conaill of the over-kingdom of Ailech.

This alliance, bolstered by one with the kingdom of Strathclyde, was to be used by Congal Cáech in an attempt to have himself installed as High King of Ireland. This resulted in the disastrous battle of Magh Rath in 637 in which Congal was slain by High King Domnall mac Áedo, king of the Cenél Conaill and over-king of Ailech. This battle resulted in Dál Riata losing possession of its Scottish lands.

It has been suggested that in 631 when Congal Cáech annexed the petty-kingdom of Mag nEilni, which lay to the west of Dál Riata, it may have been as a result of the battle of Fid Eoin.

== Bibliography ==
- Bardon, Jonathan (2005). A History of Ulster. The Black Staff Press. ISBN 0-85640-764-X.
- Fraser, James E. (2009). From Caledonia to Pictland: Scotland to 795: Scotland to 795. Edinburgh University Press. ISBN 9780748628209.
- Kirby, D.P.; Smyth, Alfred P.; Williams, Ann (1991). A Biographical Dictionary of Dark Age Britain: England, Scotland, and Wales, C. 500-c. 1050. Psychology Press. ISBN 9781852640477.
