= 563 =

Calendar year

563 in various calendars
Gregorian calendar	563; DLXIII
Ab urbe condita	1316
Armenian calendar	12; ԹՎ ԺԲ
Assyrian calendar	5313
Balinese saka calendar	484–485
Bengali calendar	−31 – −30
Berber calendar	1513
Buddhist calendar	1107
Burmese calendar	−75
Byzantine calendar	6071–6072
Chinese calendar	壬午年 (Water Horse); 3260 or 3053 — to — 癸未年 (Water Goat); 3261 or 3054
Coptic calendar	279–280
Discordian calendar	1729
Ethiopian calendar	555–556
Hebrew calendar	4323–4324
- Hindu calendars
Vikram Samvat	619–620
Shaka Samvat	484–485
Kali Yuga	3663–3664
Holocene calendar	10563
Iranian calendar	59 BP – 58 BP
Islamic calendar	61 BH – 60 BH
Javanese calendar	451–452
Julian calendar	563; DLXIII
Korean calendar	2896
Minguo calendar	1349 before ROC 民前1349年
Nanakshahi calendar	−905
Seleucid era	874/875 AG
Thai solar calendar	1105–1106
Tibetan calendar	ཆུ་ཕོ་རྟ་ལོ་ (male Water-Horse); 689 or 308 or −464 — to — ཆུ་མོ་ལུག་ལོ་ (female Water-Sheep); 690 or 309 or −463

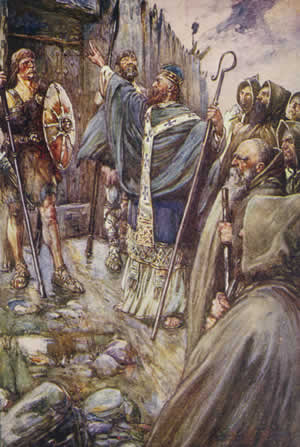
Columba at the gate of Bridei's fort (Scotland)

Year 563 (DLXIII) was a common year starting on Monday of the Julian calendar. The denomination 563 for this year has been used since the early medieval period, when the Anno Domini calendar era became the prevalent method in Europe for naming years.

== Events ==
=== By place ===
==== Byzantine Empire ====
- Emperor Justinian I pardons Belisarius; he orders his release from prison, and restores his properties and honours. He permits the general to live in obscurity, and gives him a veterans' pension.
- The new Hagia Sophia (cost: 20,000 pounds of gold), with its numerous chapels and shrines, octagonal dome and mosaics, becomes the centre and most visible monument of Eastern Orthodoxy.

==== Europe ====
- Tauredunum event: A mountain landslide into the Rhone river destroys a fort and two villages, and creates a tsunami in Lake Geneva. The wave which reaches Lausanne is thirteen metres high, and eight metres high by the time it hits Geneva. Describing the event, Marius Aventicensis writes that the tsunami "devastated very old villages with their men and cattle, it even destroyed many sacred places", and swept away "the bridge in Geneva, windmills and men".

=== By topic ===
==== Religion ====
- Columba, Irish missionary monk, travels to Scotland with twelve companions. He lands on the Kintyre Peninsula, near Southend, and begins his evangelising mission to the Picts. On the island of Iona, he founds a monastery (Iona Abbey) on the west coast in the Inner Hebrides.

== Births ==
- Andreas of Caesarea, bishop and writer (d. 637)
- Chindasuinth, king of the Visigoths (d. 653)

== Deaths ==
- January –Cutzinas, Berber chieftain
- Hou Andu, general of the Chen dynasty (b. 520)
- Wang, empress of the Liang dynasty
