= Máel Coba mac Áedo =

Irish king

Máel Coba (died 615) was a High King of Ireland.

Máel Coba was the son of Áed mac Ainmuirech (died 598) and brother of Domnall mac Áedo (died 642), both also reckoned High Kings of Ireland. They belonged to the northern Cenél Conaill branch of the Uí Néill. Máel Coba became chief of the Cenél Conaill upon the death of his brother Conall Cú mac Áedo in 604.

The high kingship of Ireland tended to rotate between the Cenél nEógain and Cenél Conaill branches from the mid-6th century. He follows Áed Uaridnach in the king lists, and is followed by Suibne Menn, both of the neighbouring Cenél nEógain, but of rival lines. He ruled from 612-615.

In 615 Máel Coba was defeated and slain by Suibne Menn at the Battle of Sliab Truim. According to Lacy (82, 2006) the location of this battle is not the usually identified Bessy Bell mountain in Co. Tyrone, but rather near Sliabh Tuath (Slievetooey) in southwest Donegal, a prominent mountain in Cenél mBógaine territory. He notes “it is difficult to see why these two powerful (allegedly) Donegal dynasts would have been fighting each other at such a location(Bessy Bell) in 613. Later texts state that Máel Coba survived the battle, became a poet, a bishop of Clogher, then a hermit at Druminillar townland, Beleek parish, County Fermanagh and then died of the plague.

Suibne Menn apparently installed Óengus mac Colmáin as High King, at least in name.

He had two sons who were counted as joint High Kings in some sources, Cellach (died 658) and Conall (died 654). Dúnchad mac Cinn Fáelad, abbot of Iona (died 717) is recorded as Máel Coba's grandson.
