= Conall Cóel =

Irish king

Conall mac Máele Coba, called Conall Cóel, (died 654) was an Irish king and is said to have been High King of Ireland.

== Biography ==
Conall was the son of Máel Coba mac Áedo and belonged to the Cenél Conaill branch of the northern Uí Néill. According to the Irish annals derived from the Chronicle of Ireland, he may have been High King, jointly with his brother Cellach mac Máele Coba, following the death of his uncle Domnall mac Áedo in 642. The Annals of Ulster for 643 say:

Here there is doubt as to who reigned after Domnall. Some historiographers say that four kings, namely Cellach and Conall Cóel and the two sons of Áed Sláine, namely Diarmait and Blathmac, ruled in shared reigns.

All four putative successors to Domnall had been his allies at the great Battle of Mag Rath in 637, where Congal Cáech was defeated and the authority of the Uí Néill re-established, and it is not implausible that all four ruled together. Conall is mentioned as the commander of Domnall's forces at the Battle of Sailtír, a naval battle which defeated the forces of the Cenél nEógain and Dál Riata on the same day as Mag Rath in 637.

He ruled from 643-654. The king lists have Cellach and Conall reigning before Diarmait and Blathmac. Both Cellach and Conall are omitted from the earliest king list—a late 7th century poem called Baile Chuinn.

Their cousin Óengus mac Domnaill may have attempted to take power in the north. He was killed in a battle at Dún Cremthainn in 650, fighting against Conall and Cellach.

Conall Cóel was killed in 654. A gloss added to the Annals of Ulster states that he was killed by Diarmait, and this is repeated in the Annals of the Four Masters.
