= 517 =

Calendar year

517 in various calendars
Gregorian calendar	517; DXVII
Ab urbe condita	1270
Assyrian calendar	5267
Balinese saka calendar	438–439
Bengali calendar	−77 – −76
Berber calendar	1467
Buddhist calendar	1061
Burmese calendar	−121
Byzantine calendar	6025–6026
Chinese calendar	丙申年 (Fire Monkey); 3214 or 3007 — to — 丁酉年 (Fire Rooster); 3215 or 3008
Coptic calendar	233–234
Discordian calendar	1683
Ethiopian calendar	509–510
Hebrew calendar	4277–4278
- Hindu calendars
Vikram Samvat	573–574
Shaka Samvat	438–439
Kali Yuga	3617–3618
Holocene calendar	10517
Iranian calendar	105 BP – 104 BP
Islamic calendar	108 BH – 107 BH
Javanese calendar	404–405
Julian calendar	517; DXVII
Korean calendar	2850
Minguo calendar	1395 before ROC 民前1395年
Nanakshahi calendar	−951
Seleucid era	828/829 AG
Thai solar calendar	1059–1060
Tibetan calendar	མེ་ཕོ་སྤྲེ་ལོ་ (male Fire-Monkey); 643 or 262 or −510 — to — མེ་མོ་བྱ་ལོ་ (female Fire-Bird); 644 or 263 or −509

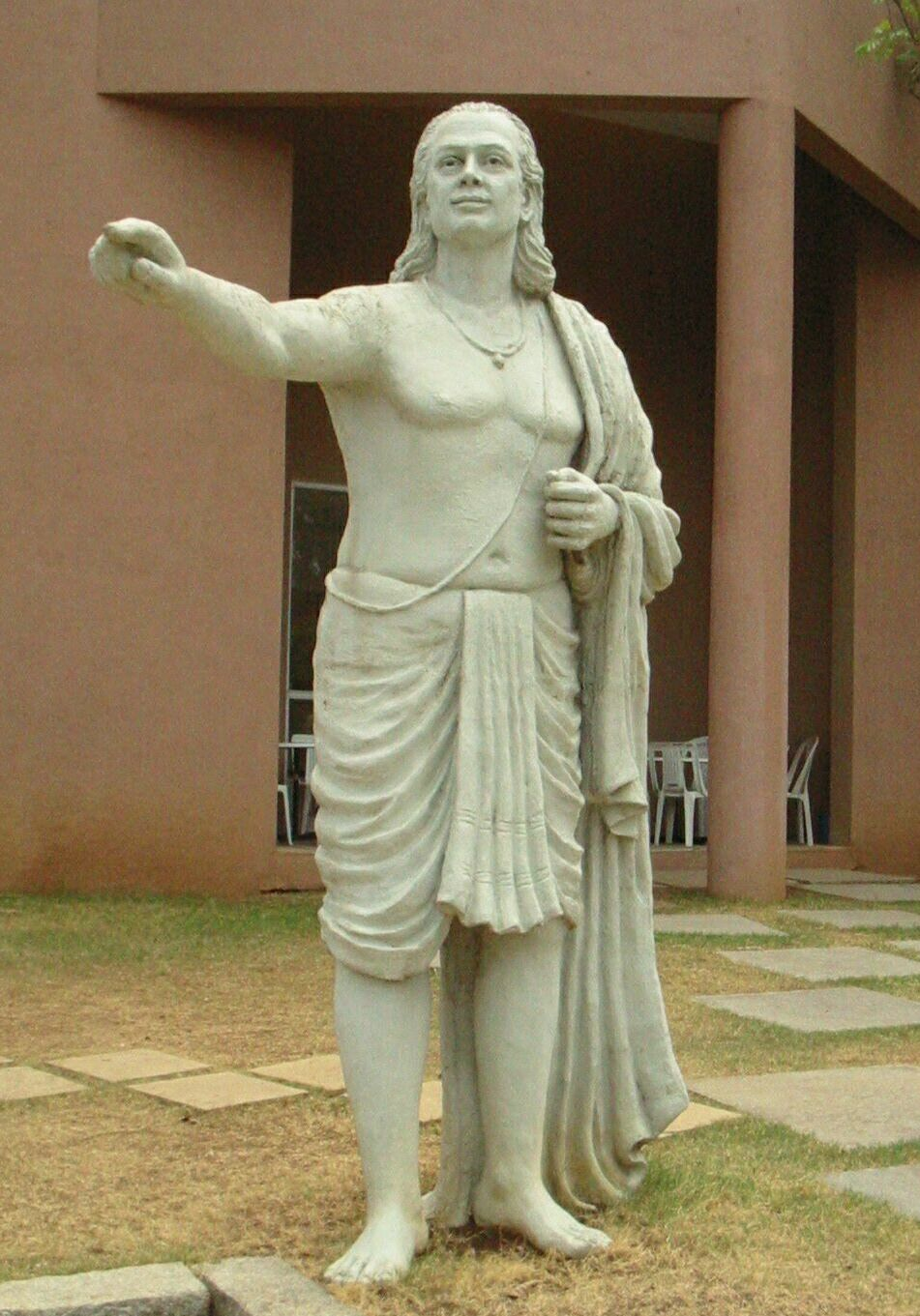
Statue of Aryabhata (476–550)

Year 517 (DXVII) was a common year starting on Sunday of the Julian calendar. At the time, it was known as the Year of the Consulship of Agapitus and Paulus among the Romans (or, less frequently, year 1270 Ab urbe condita). The denomination 517 for this year has been used since the early medieval period, when the Anno Domini calendar era became the prevalent method in Europe for naming years.

== Events ==
=== By place ===
==== Europe ====
- King Sigismund of Burgundy is opposed by his son Sigeric, and has him strangled. Overcome with remorse, he retreats to the monastery that he founded, St. Maurice's Abbey (modern Switzerland).

==== China ====
- Emperor Wu Di of the Liang Dynasty becomes a Buddhist, and introduces the new religion to central China. He demands that sacrifices to imperial ancestors be changed to using dried meat, instead of the traditional animals (goats, pigs and cows).

=== By topic ===
==== Religion ====
- Council of Epaone: Bishops of southern Gaul convene near Epao (present Anneyron) in Burgundy. The synod enacts the first legislation against wooden altars, forbidding the building of any but stone altars with chrism (a mixture of oil and spice).

==== Science ====
- Aryabhata compiles his manual of mathematics and astronomy (approximate date).

== Births ==
- Charibert I, king of the Franks (approximate date)
- Ebrulf, Frankish hermit and abbot (d. 596)

== Deaths ==
- April 5 – Timothy I, patriarch of Constantinople
- Dioscorus II, Coptic Orthodox patriarch of Alexandria
- Macedonius II, patriarch of Constantinople (approximate date)
