= 691 =

Calendar year

691 in various calendars
Gregorian calendar	691; DCXCI
Ab urbe condita	1444
Armenian calendar	140; ԹՎ ՃԽ
Assyrian calendar	5441
Balinese saka calendar	612–613
Bengali calendar	97–98
Berber calendar	1641
Buddhist calendar	1235
Burmese calendar	53
Byzantine calendar	6199–6200
Chinese calendar	庚寅年 (Metal Tiger); 3388 or 3181 — to — 辛卯年 (Metal Rabbit); 3389 or 3182
Coptic calendar	407–408
Discordian calendar	1857
Ethiopian calendar	683–684
Hebrew calendar	4451–4452
- Hindu calendars
Vikram Samvat	747–748
Shaka Samvat	612–613
Kali Yuga	3791–3792
Holocene calendar	10691
Iranian calendar	69–70
Islamic calendar	71–72
Japanese calendar	Shuchō 6 (朱鳥６年)
Javanese calendar	583–584
Julian calendar	691; DCXCI
Korean calendar	3024
Minguo calendar	1221 before ROC 民前1221年
Nanakshahi calendar	−777
Seleucid era	1002/1003 AG
Thai solar calendar	1233–1234
Tibetan calendar	ལྕགས་ཕོ་སྟག་ལོ་ (male Iron-Tiger); 817 or 436 or −336 — to — ལྕགས་མོ་ཡོས་ལོ་ (female Iron-Hare); 818 or 437 or −335

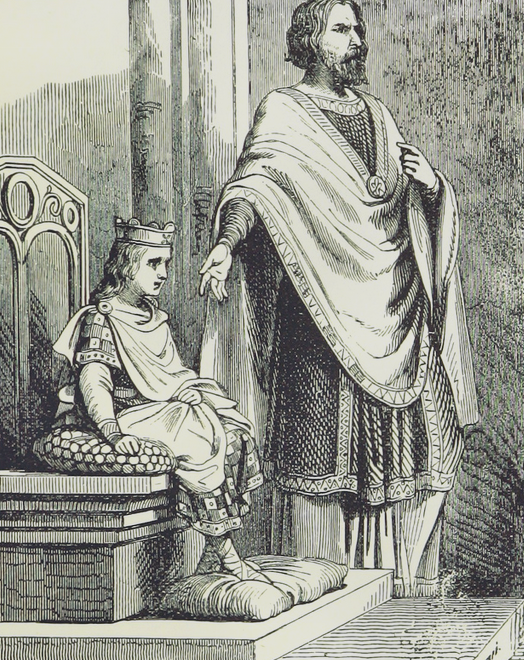
King Clovis IV and Pepin of Herstal

Year 691 (DCXCI) was a common year starting on Sunday of the Julian calendar. The denomination 691 for this year has been used since the early medieval period, when the Anno Domini calendar era became the prevalent method in Europe for naming years.

== Events ==
=== By place ===
==== Europe ====
- King Theuderic III dies and is succeeded by his son Clovis IV, age 9, as sole ruler of the Franks. He becomes a puppet—a roi fainéant—of his uncle Pepin of Herstal, mayor of the palace of Austrasia.

==== Arabian Empire ====
- Battle of Maskin: An Umayyad army under caliph Abd al-Malik defeats the rebel forces in Mesopotamia (modern Iraq). He reconquers the Arabian Peninsula, taking the holy city of Medina.

=== By topic ===
==== Architecture ====
- The Dome of the Rock is completed in Jerusalem (under the patronage of Abd al-Malik) during the Second Fitna, becoming the first work of Islamic architecture.

==== Religion ====
- Wilfrid, abbot of Ripon, tries to make himself bishop of all Northumbria. King Aldfrith seizes many of his Ripon Abbey estates, and proposes to create a bishopric there. Wilfrid is banished and flees to Mercia, where King Æthelred makes him bishop of Leicester.

== Births ==
- Hisham ibn Abd al-Malik, Muslim caliph (d. 743)
- Marwan II, Muslim caliph (d. 750)

== Deaths ==
- August 24 – Fu Youyi, official of the Tang dynasty
- November 7 – Cen Changqian, official of the Tang dynasty
- November 7 – Ge Fuyuan, official of the Tang dynasty
- Fithceallach mac Flainn, king of Uí Maine (Ireland)
- Theuderic III, king of the Franks (b. 654)
- Sun Guoting, Chinese calligrapher (b. 646)
