= Apranik =

Sasanian military commander

Apranik (fl. 651 AD) was a Sasanian military commander. She commanded the army of Yazdegerd III against the Arab invasion of 651 AD.

== Biography ==
She was the daughter of Piran.

When the Sasanian Empire was invaded by the Islamic Rashidun Caliphate, Apranik joined the Sasanian army to fight against them. The Persians were defeated, but Apranik took command of many surviving forces and mounted an ongoing guerrilla war against the Caliphate.

She is said to have died in combat.
