= Suibne Menn =

Suibne Menn (or Suibne mac Fiachnai, "Suibne the Stammerer, son of Fiachnae"; died AD 628) was an Irish king who is counted as a High King of Ireland.

Suibne belonged to the junior branch of the Cenél nEógain kindred of the northern Uí Néill, the Cenél Feredaig, named for his grandfather Feredach, a great-grandson of Niall of the Nine Hostages. The kingship of Cenél nEógain had been dominated by the Cenél maic Ercae, descendants of Feradach's brother Muirchertach mac Ercae. Neither Suibne's father Fiachnae, nor his grandfather, had been kings of Cenél nEógain.

Áed Uaridnach of the Cenél maic Ercae died in 612, and the kingship of the Uí Néill passed to the rival northern Cenél Conaill in the person of Máel Coba mac Áedo. Máel Coba was killed by Suibne in 615, apparently in the midlands of Ireland, whereupon Suibne took power. It is suggested that Suibne Menn's control of the kingship rested on an alliance with another minor Uí Néill kindred, the southern Clann Cholmáin. According to the Irish annals, Óengus, head of Clann Cholmáin, was High King at his death in 621, so that Suibne may have granted Óengus the kingship before assuming it himself.

In 628 Máel Coba's brother Domnall attacked Suibne, but was defeated and fled. Suibne, however, was killed later that year by the king of Ulster, Congal Cáech, who installed himself as High King. Charles-Edwards supposes that this surprising outcome was achieved "perhaps by some form of surprise attack".

Although the Cenél nEógain did not again hold the High Kingship until the 8th century, his descendants, and not the rival Cenél maic Ercae, held the kingship of Cenél nEógain until the death of his great-grandson Fland mac Máele Tuile c. 700.
