= Battle of Hazir =

637 CE conflict between the Rashidun Caliphate and Byzantine Empire

- Part of the Muslim conquest of Syria (Arab–Byzantine wars)
Date	June 637
Location	Qinnasrin, Syria 35°59′45″N 37°3′27″E
Result	Rashidun Caliphate victory

Belligerents
Rashidun Caliphate	Byzantine Empire

Commanders and leaders
Khalid ibn al-Walid	Menas †

Units involved
Mobile guard	Unknown

Strength
17,000 (Muslim source)	70,000 (Muslim source) ~7,000 (Modern estimate)

Casualties and losses
Minimal	Entire Force

The Battle of Hazir or Ma'arakah al-Haadhir (Arabic: معركة الحاضر) took place between the Byzantine army and the Rashidun army's elite cavalry, the Mobile guard. It took place in June 637, three miles east of Qinnasrin at Al-Hadher in present-day Syria.

== Background ==
After the conquest of Jerusalem, Caliph Umar went back to his capital city of Madinah while Commander Yazeed proceeded to Caesarea and once again laid siege to the port city. Commanders Amr bin al-A’as and Sharhabeel marched to reoccupy Palestine and Jordan, which was completed by the end of the year. Abu Ubaidah ibn al-Jarrah and Khalid ibn Walid, with an army of 17,000 men, set off from Jerusalem to conquer all of northern Syria.

Abu Ubaidah marched to Damascus, which was already in Muslim hands, and then to Emesa, which welcomed his return. His next objective was Qinnasrin which was approached with Khalid and the Mobile Guard in the lead. After a few days the Mobile Guard reached Hazir, three miles east of Qinnasrin, where it was attacked in strength by the Byzantines.

The Byzantine garrison commander at Qinnasrin was a general named Menas, a distinguished soldier who was loved by his men. Menas knew that if he stayed in Qinnasrin, he would be besieged by the Rashidun army and would eventually have to surrender, as he could expect no help from the emperor. He therefore decided to take the offensive and attack the leading elements of the Rashidun army well forward of the city and attempt to defeat them before they could be joined by the main body. With this plan in mind, Menas attacked the Mobile Guard at Hazir with a force whose strength was about 7,000 men; in this effort, he either did not know that Khalid was present with the leading elements of the Muslim army or did not believe all that he had heard about Khalid ibn Walid.

According to Peter Crawford, the numbers recorded for the subsequent Battle of Hazir are disputed. Due to the mass evacuation of Syria ordered by Heraclius, it would be surprising if Menas had even a tenth of this recorded figure, while it is somewhat unlikely Abu Ubayda and Khalid would have as many men as this with the detachment of the corps of Yazid, Shurahbil, and Amr.

== Battle ==
The battle began on a plain three miles east of Qinnasrin at Al-Hadher, which was a farming village. Khalid deployed his Mobile Guard into its fighting formation for battle. Menas arranged his army in one center and two wings and was himself in the front ranks leading the army like Khalid. Soon fierce clashes broke out at Hazir. The battle was still in its early stages when Menas was killed. As the news of his death spread among his men, the Byzantine soldiers went wild with fury and savagely attacked to avenge their leader's death.

At that time, Khalid took a cavalry regiment and maneuvered from a wing to attack the Byzantine army from the rear. Soon the entire Roman army was encircled and defeated. It is said that Menas and his garrison had never suffered such a severe defeat.

== Aftermath ==
As soon as the battle was over, the people of Hazir came out of their town to greet Khalid. They pleaded that they were Arabs and had no intention of opposing him. Khalid accepted their surrender and advanced to Qinnasrin. In another account, however, Ibn al-Adim suggested that Khalid killed some of the townspeople although Yohann Friedmann, the translator of Tabari, did not agree.

At Qinnasrin, the part of the Roman garrison which had not accompanied Menas to Hazir shut itself up in the fort. As soon as Khalid arrived, he sent a message to the garrison:

"If you were in the clouds, Allah would raise us to you or lower you to us for battle."

Without further delay, Qinnasrin surrendered to Khalid. The Battle of Hazir and the surrender of Qinnasrin took place in about June 637. When Caliph Umar received reports of the Battle of Hazir, he made no attempt to conceal his admiration for the military genius of Khalid. Umar exclaimed:

"Khalid is truly the commander, May Allah have mercy upon Abu Bakr. He was a better judge of men than I have been."

This was Umar's first admission that perhaps he had not judged Khalid rightly after he had dismissed Khalid from the command of the Muslim army.

== General references ==
- Akram, A.I. The Sword of Allah: Khalid bin al-Waleed, His Life and Campaigns, Nat. Publishing. House, Rawalpindi (1970) ISBN 978-0-7101-0104-4.
- Muhammad Ubaid al-Rifai, Mansur (207). Ra'd al-Shabaab Khalid bin Walid. p. 254.
- "بغية الطلب في تاريخ حلب". islamport.com. Muuqa Al-Warraq.
- Zubdat al-Halab fi ta'arikh Halab (زبدة الحلب في تأريخ حلب; The cream of the history of Aleppo) written by Ibn al-Adim
