= 596 =

Calendar year

596 in various calendars
- Gregorian calendar: 596; DXCVI
- Ab urbe condita: 1349
- Armenian calendar: 45; ԹՎ ԽԵ
- Assyrian calendar: 5346
- Balinese saka calendar: 517–518
- Bengali calendar: 2–3
- Berber calendar: 1546
- Buddhist calendar: 1140
- Burmese calendar: −42
- Byzantine calendar: 6104–6105
- Chinese calendar: 乙卯年 (Wood Rabbit); 3293 or 3086 — to — 丙辰年 (Fire Dragon); 3294 or 3087
- Coptic calendar: 312–313
- Discordian calendar: 1762
- Ethiopian calendar: 588–589
- Hebrew calendar: 4356–4357
- Hindu calendars
- Vikram Samvat: 652–653
- Shaka Samvat: 517–518
- Kali Yuga: 3696–3697
- Holocene calendar: 10596
- Iranian calendar: 26 BP – 25 BP
- Islamic calendar: 27 BH – 26 BH
- Javanese calendar: 485–486
- Julian calendar: 596; DXCVI
- Korean calendar: 2929
- Minguo calendar: 1316 before ROC 民前1316年
- Nanakshahi calendar: −872
- Seleucid era: 907/908 AG
- Thai solar calendar: 1138–1139
- Tibetan calendar: ཤིང་མོ་ཡོས་ལོ་ (female Wood-Hare); 722 or 341 or −431 — to — མེ་ཕོ་འབྲུག་ལོ་ (male Fire-Dragon); 723 or 342 or −430

Settlements of Anglo-Saxon people in Britain

Year 596 (DXCVI) was a leap year starting on Sunday of the Julian calendar. The denomination 596 for this year has been used since the early medieval period, when the Anno Domini calendar era became the prevalent method in Europe for naming years.

== Events ==
=== By place ===
==== Byzantine Empire ====
- Emperor Maurice uses the city of Marcianopolis (modern Bulgaria) as a military base of operations on the lower Danube River, against the Slavs on the Balkans.

==== Britain ====
- Battle of Raith: An invading force of Angles lands on the Fife coast near Raith (Kirkcaldy) and defeats an alliance of Scots, Britons and Picts, under King Áedán mac Gabráin of Dál Riata (Scotland).

==== Asia ====
- Emperor Wéndi sends diplomatic letters to the royal court of Goguryeo (Korea). He demands the cancellation of the military alliance with the Eastern Turk Khanate, and the raiding of Sui border regions.

=== By topic ===
==== Religion ====
- Gregorian Mission: Augustine of Canterbury lands with a group of missionaries on the Isle of Thanet (South East England). He is welcomed by King Æthelberht of Kent, who accepts baptism along with the rest of his court at the behest of his Christian Frankish wife, Bertha. Æthelbert assigns Augustine and his 40 monks a residence at Canterbury (Kent), where they found a Benedictine monastery that will make the town a centre of Christianity (or 597).

== Births ==
- Cui Dunli, general of the Tang dynasty (d. 656)
- Daoxuan, Chinese Buddhist monk (d. 667)
- Gao Jifu, chancellor of the Tang dynasty (d. 654)
- Kōtoku, emperor of Japan (d. 654)
- Liu Xiangdao, official of the Tang dynasty (d. 666)

== Deaths ==
- Ebrulf, Frankish hermit and abbot (b. 517)
- Marius Aventicensis, bishop of Aventicum (b. 532)
