= Menas (Byzantine general) =

7th century Byzantine general

Menas (Greek: Μηνᾶ στρατηλάτου; d. June 637) was a Byzantine general (magister militum) and patrikios who commanded the garrison at Chalkis and died in the Battle of Hazir. Although his exact title is unknown, al-Tabari and Ibn al-Adim both attest that he was the second-in-command after Emperor Heraclius.

== Biography ==
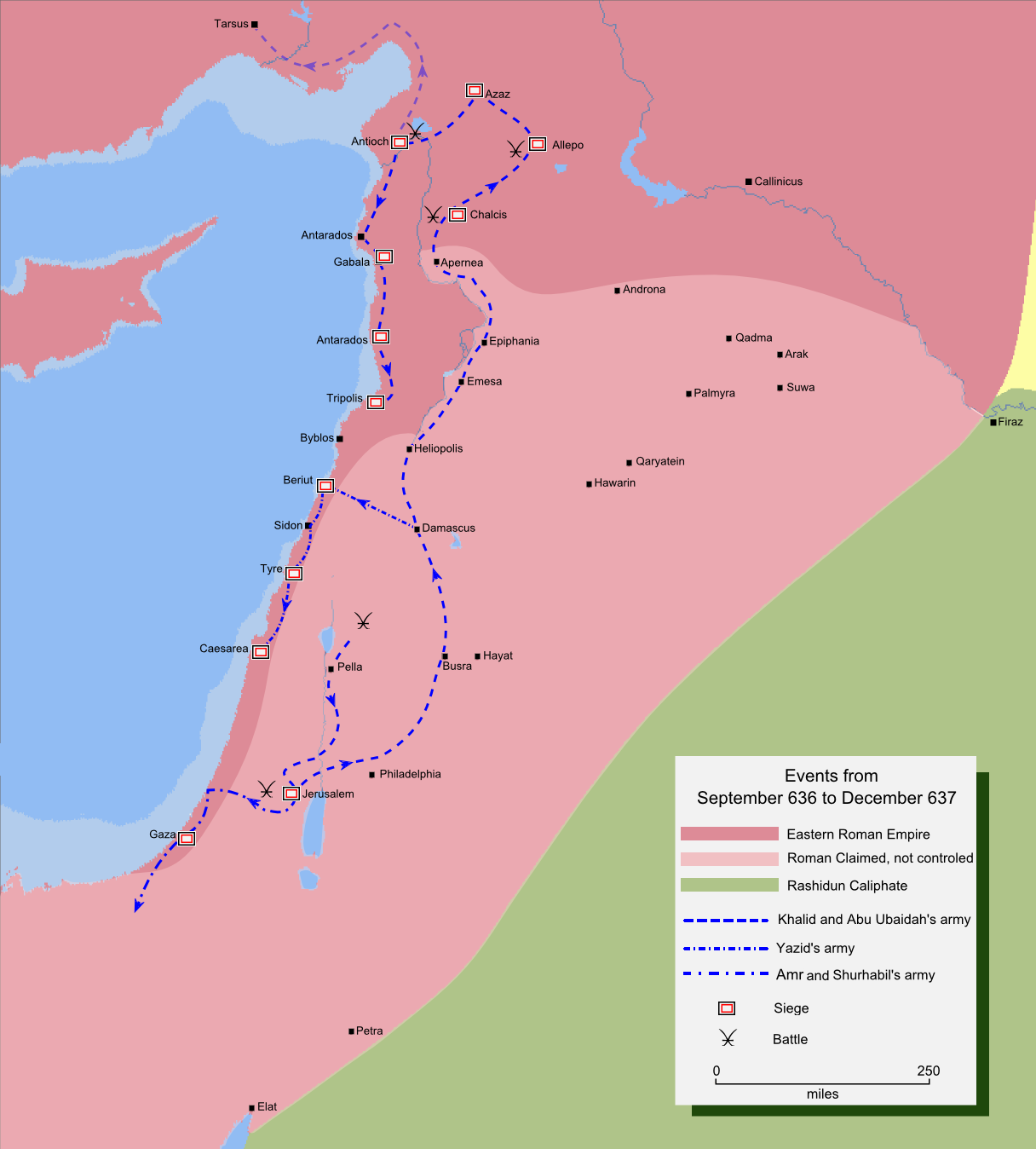
Map detailing the route of Muslim invasion of northern Syria.

Following the Battle of Yarmouk in August 636, Syrian cities fell rapidly to Muslim armies. Damascus surrendered in late 636, followed by the Beqaa Valley, Emesa, Jerusalem after a long siege, Gaza, and Ashkelon. Menas was a distinguished soldier at the time who was loved by his men. Emperor Heraclius retreated north to Antioch, and appointed Menas to guard Chalkis, which had a strategically significant and virtually impregnable fort, as it was a gateway to Anatolia, Heraclius' homeland of Armenia, and the regional capital, Antioch. He was one of several military governors whom Heraclius appointed to replace civilian ones, possibly out of frustration with civilian governors' surrenders and deals with the Muslims.

After taking Jerusalem, Abu Ubayda ibn al-Jarrah sent Khalid ibn al-Walid and his Mobile Guard north towards Chalcis. Menas knew that if he stayed in Chalcis, he would be besieged by the Rashidun army and would eventually have to surrender, as he could expect no help from the emperor. Therefore, diverging from conventional Byzantine tactics, he decided to face Khalid and destroy the leading elements of Muslim army before the main body could join them at Hazir, 5 kilometres (3 mi) east of Chalcis. The resulting Battle of Hazir was a disaster for the Byzantines, who according to al-Tabari had "never suffered a defeat like this". Menas died in the battle, as did all of his soldiers.

Khalid then entered Hazir. Ibn al-Adim writes that Khalid killed some of its people and left others (قتل منهم وترك الباقين), but al-Tabari instead says that he "accepted" some and left others (قبل منهم وترك الباقين). Heraclius retreated further north, and the Byzantines and Muslims agreed to a year-long truce. When it ended in 638, they quickly occupied the rest of northern Syria, including Antioch, Cyrrhus, Manbij, and Aleppo without encountering much resistance.

Menas was probably the owner of a lead seal inscribed with "Θεοτόκε Νουμερικ[ῶ]ν βοήθ[ει] Μη[ν]ᾶ στρατηλάτου" (Theotokos of Noumerika, Help Menas the Magister Militum). "Noumerika" may refer either to a town in Bithynia, or to the Noumeroi.

== Sources ==
- Ibn al-Adim (1243). Caetani, Leone (ed.). Annali dell'Islam. Vol. 3.
- Crawford, Peter (2013). The War of the Three Gods: Romans, Persians and the Rise of Islam. Pen and Sword.
- Jones, A. H. M.; Martindale, J. R; Morris, John (1992). The Prosopography of the Later Roman Empire. Vol. III: A.D. 527–641. Oxford University Press. ISBN 978-0-521-20160-5.
- Kaegi, Walter Emil (1995). Byzantium and the early Islamic conquests. Cambridge: Cambridge University Press. ISBN 978-0-521-48455-8.
- al-Tabari (915). Friedmann, Yohanan (ed.). The History of al-Tabari (PDF). Vol. 12.
