= Princess Si of Anding =

First Daughter Of Wu Zetian

- Born: 19 March(?) 654; Chang'an, Tang China
- Died: 654
- Burial: Chongjing Temple
Posthumous name
- Si (思; lit. ''to yearn for'')
- House: Li
- Dynasty: Tang
- Father: Emperor Gaozong of Tang
- Mother: Empress Zetian

Princess Si of Anding
- Chinese: 安定思公主
Transcriptions
Standard Mandarin
- Hanyu Pinyin: Āndìng Sī Gōngzhǔ
- IPA: IPAc-cmnan1.ding4 si1 gong1.zhu3
Yue: Cantonese
- Jyutping: on1 ding6 si1 gung1 zyu2
- IPA: IPAc-yueɔːn1.tɪŋ6 sɪː1 kʊŋ1.tsyː2

Princess Si of Anding (安定思公主; 19 March(?) 654 – 654) was a princess of the Tang dynasty of China. She was honored with the title "Princess Anding", along with the posthumous name "Si" in 664.

She was the first daughter and second child of Empress Zetian, the only empress regnant in Chinese history, and was the third daughter and eighth child of her father, Emperor Gaozong of Tang.

== Brief life ==
Princess Si was born in 654 AD during her father’s reign, Emperor Gaozong of Tang (third emperor of the Chinese Tang dynasty) to then concubine Wu Zetian (later the only empress regnant in Chinese history). We know she lived within the Taiji Palace in Chang’an, as it was the imperial residence before the establishment of Daming Palace. Tragically, she died within the same year, before receiving a formal name.

== Family background ==
Princess Si of Anding was a member of the imperial Tang dynasty, born into the ruling family. Her father, Emperor Gaozong of Tanggoverned the empire during a period of expansion and consolidation, while her mother, Wu Zetian, was the only female Chinese emperor.

She had several notable siblings, including:

- Li Hong: Crown prince of the Tang Dynasty and son of Emperor Gaozong and Empress Wu Zetian; he died young under mysterious circumstances.
- Li Xian: Son of Emperor Gaozong and Empress Wu Zetian, he was Crown Prince but was forced to abdicate and never became emperor due to palace intrigues during Wu Zetian’s rise to power.
- Emperor Zhongzong of Tang : Twice emperor of Tang China, he was restored to the throne after Empress Wu’s reign and known for his turbulent rule and political struggles.
- Emperor Ruizong of Tang: Tang emperor who ruled twice, often overshadowed by Empress Wu and his sister Princess Taiping’s political influence.
- Princess Taiping: She was a prominent political figure of the Tang dynasty and Zhou dynasty.

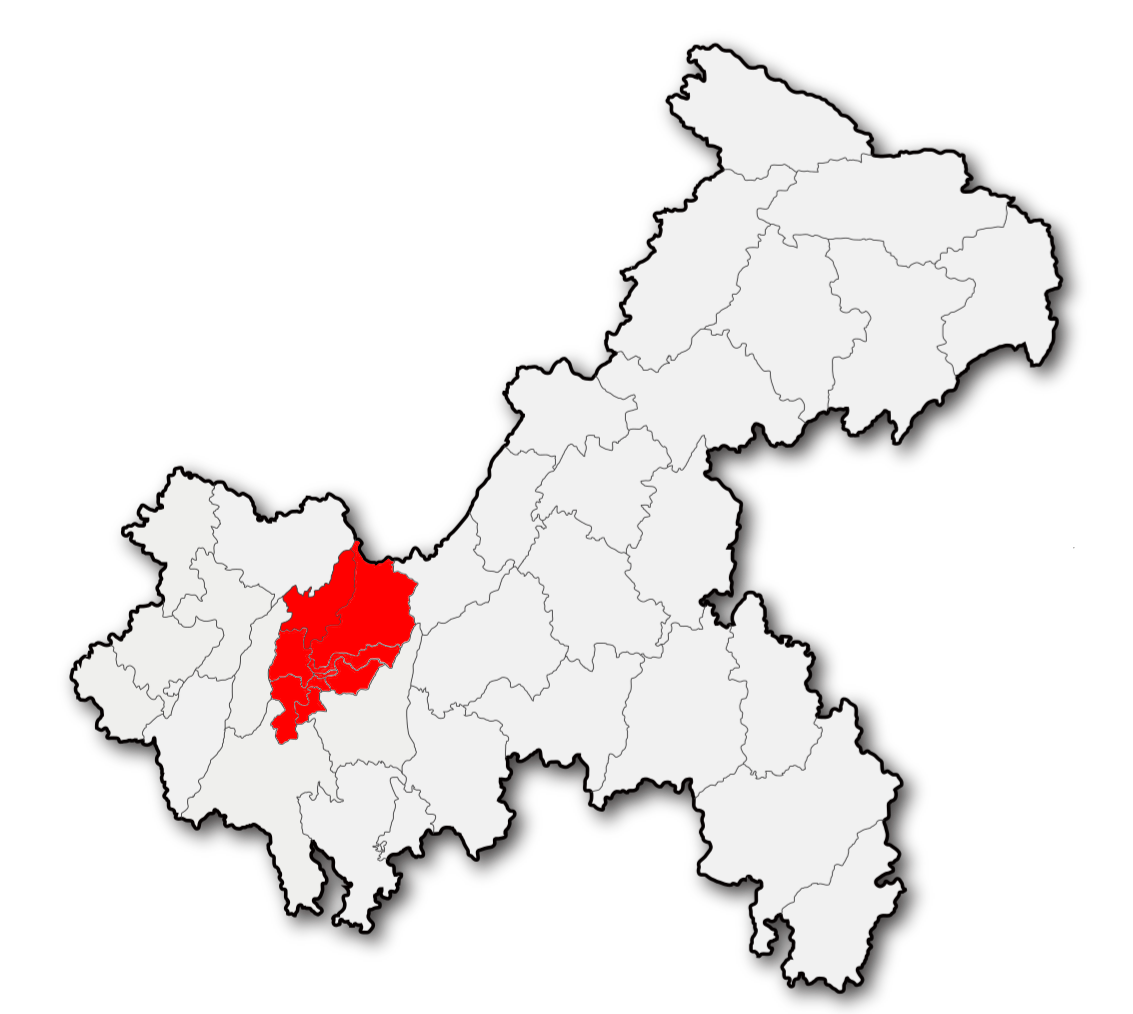
Chongqing CITY.png (description page)

== Death and burial ==
Princess Si of Anding was born in 654 AD but tragically died in the same year several months later, too young to have a name.

In 664, ten years after her death, the Emperor Gaozong of Tang and Wu Zetian decreed that the princess be posthumously honored with the title Princess Anding, along with the posthumous name "Si." She was initially laid to rest at Deye Temple with a ceremonial burial and later, her remains were relocated to Chongjing Temple (which no longer stands).

== Alleged murder ==
Despite limited historical records about her life, Princess Si’s death is often associated with various stories concerning her alleged murder. The earliest sources, such as The Old Book of Tang, written in five Dynasties and ten Kingdoms Period, records that Princess Si of Anding "died suddenly," implying a natural cause of death without suggesting foul play but the Tang Huiyao, which was complied in the early Song Dynasty adds that Wu Zetian later accused Empress Wang of killing her daughter. However, later historical texts—such as New Book of Tang and Zizhi Tongjian ( texts compiled centuries later) —present vastly different accounts, accusing Wu Zetian or Empress Wang of involvement and provide much greater detail about the incident.

=== Consistent Historical Details ===
The only consistent details across the historical sources are that Princess Si of Anding died suddenly in 654 AD and that Empress Wang's eventual deposition did not officially cite the alleged murder of the princess as a reason. Given the discrepancies, the other claims regarding the circumstances of her death and the surrounding political intrigue remain speculative, with later sources presenting conflicting narratives.

=== New Book of Tang ===
According to the New Book of Tang, Wu Zetian gave birth to a daughter and then While visiting her residence for an unspecified matter, Empress Wang encountered the infant and found the child to be exceptionally endearing. Unable to resist, she paused to engage playfully with the baby for a brief moment. Following her departure, Wu Zetian secretly killed the child under the quilt. When the emperor arrived, she feigned shock upon discovering her daughter's "sudden death." When Emperor Gaozong questioned the people there and they said Empress Wang was here few a moments ago, Wu Zetian started crying and slandered Empress Wang even more. Empress Wang lost the opportunity to explain the situation, which contributed to Wang’s eventual deposition. However, when Emperor Gaozong formally removed Empress Wang, the official justification was that of Empress Wang’s removal citied her alleged use of poison with no mention of the death or her killing the princess.

This dramatic account has been adapted in TV series and historical dramas, often depicting Wu Zetian as a calculating ruler willing to sacrifice her own child for political gain.

=== Zizhi Tongjian ===
The account in the Zizhi Tongjian is very similar to that in the New Book of Tang:

The Zizhi Tongjian records an account that follows the New Book of Tang. It states that despite the Empress Wang favor, the emperor did not intend to depose her. Zhaoyi gave birth to a daughter, and the empress briefly interacted with the child. However, after the empress left, Wu Zetian allegedly strangled the infant and then hid the body under a quilt. When the emperor arrived, Wu Zetian revealed the quilt, showing that the child had died. She reacted with shock and cried out. The emperor then questioned his attendants, who reported that the empress had been present earlier. This angered the emperor, and he accused the queen of the act. Wu Zetian further slandered the empress, leaving her unable to defend herself. As a result, the emperor began to consider deposing her.

=== Hui Yao ===
During the late Tang Dynasty, a book titled Hui Yao was written by Su Bian and Su Mian, brothers who lived during the reign of Emperor Dezong (742–805), nearly a century after Wu Zetian. Hui Yao contains the statement: "The daughter born to Zhaoyi died suddenly, and she reported to Emperor Gaozong that Queen Wang had killed her." This suggests that Wu Zetian’s daughter died unexpectedly, but she accused Empress Wang of the crime.

== Artistic representation ==
Drama	Notes & Sources	Ref.
Secret History of Princess Taiping	In the series Secret History of Princess Taiping, Wu Zetian’s firstborn daughter, Princess si, survives past infancy (Historically, she dies). As an adult, she impersonates her younger sister, Princess Taiping, to infiltrate the palace and attempt to usurp her mother’s throne. Played by: Alyssa Chia, Zheng Shuang, Lin Miaoke	
Secret History of Empress Wu	Princess Si death is shown in the show	
The Empress of China	Princess Si death is shown in the show	
