= Jurmin =

Anglo-Saxon prince and saint (d. 654)

Saint
- Died: 654AD
- Feast: 24 February

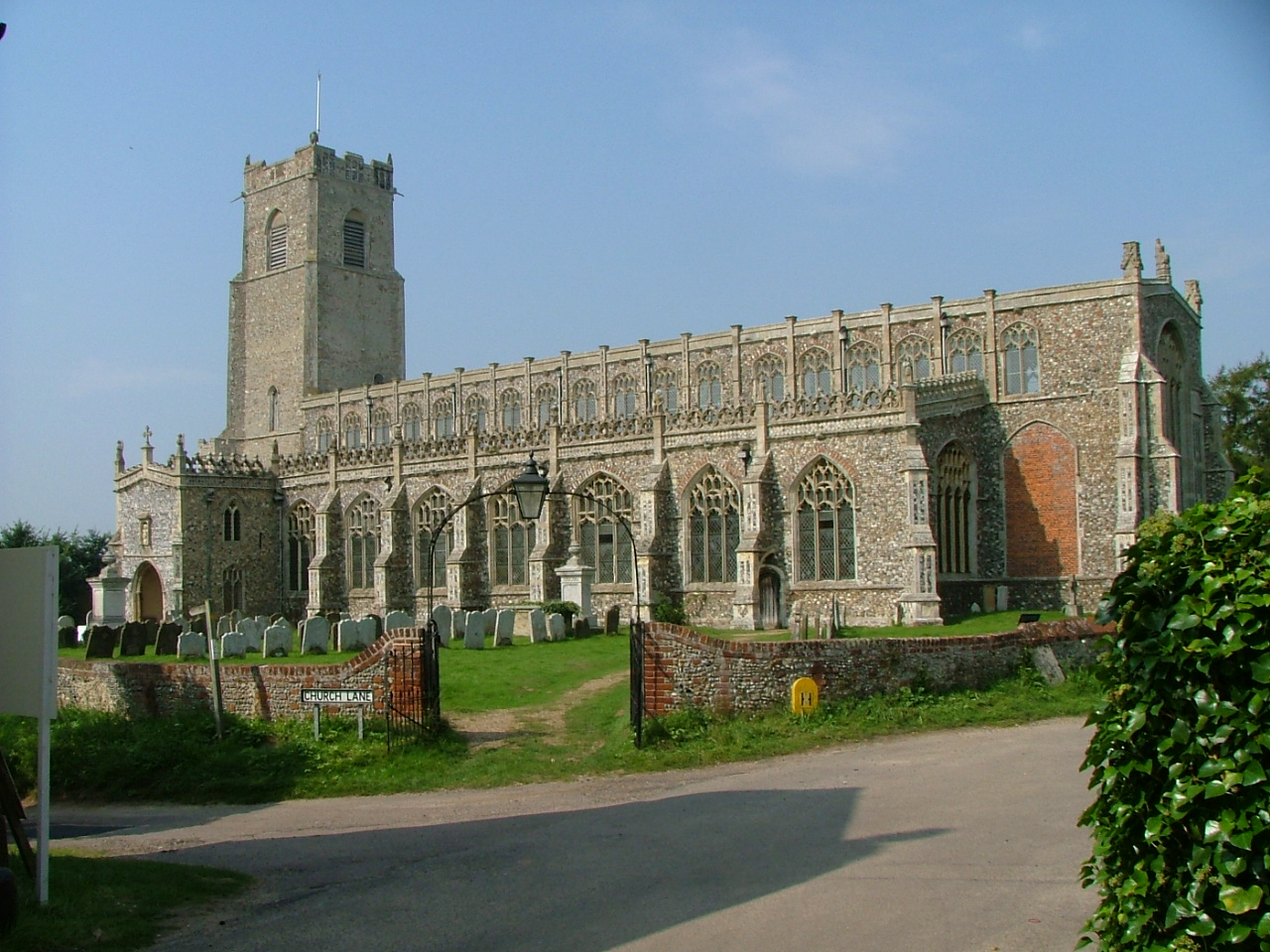
Holy Trinity church in Blythburgh, modern successor to the nearby ruined Blythburgh Priory

Jurmin (died 654) also known as Hiurmine of Blythburgh, was an Anglo-Saxon prince who was the son and heir of Anna of East Anglia, a 7th-century king of East Anglia, a kingdom which today includes the English counties of Norfolk and Suffolk. As such, he was the brother of saints Seaxburh of Ely, Æthelthryth, and Æthelburh of Faremoutiers.

Jumin and his father were killed in 654 at the Battle of Bulcamp, fighting against the Mercians. His body was originally buried at nearby Blythburgh Priory, but later moved to Bury St Edmunds.

Jurmin is venerated as a saint: his feast day is 24 February.

== Sources ==
- Stanton, Richard (1892). A menology of England and Wales: or, Brief memorials of the ancient British and English saints arranged according to the calendar, together with the martyrs of the 16th and 17th centuries. Burns & Oates.
