= Domnall mac Áedo =

7th-century Irish monarch

Domnall mac Áedo (died 642), also known as Domnall II, was an Irish king and son of Áed mac Ainmuirech and his consort Land, the daughter of Áed Guaire mac Amalgada of Airgíalla. Domnall was High King of Ireland from 628 until his death. He belonged to the Cenél Conaill kindred of the Northern Uí Néill.

The year of Domnall's birth is not known, and even an approximation depends on the date of the convention of Druim Cett, which is debated. Certainly he must have been born around 570 at the earliest, and around 590 at the latest. According to Adomnán's Life of Saint Columba, Domnall mac Áedo met Columba at Druim Cett while still a boy. Columba prophesied great success and a peaceful death in old age for Domnall.

Domnall's brother Máel Cobo (died 615) is said to have been High King of Ireland, and his father Áed also, but both claims are later inventions based on the Annals of the Four Masters and similar writings. The list of High Kings found in the Baile Chuinn Cétchathaigh (The Frenzy of Conn of the Hundred Battles), which is dated to before 695, includes Domnall. The original writer of the Annals of Ulster named just twelve "kings of Ireland", starting with Domnall in 628–642, and ending with Ruaidrí Ua Conchobair in 1166–1186.

The first reference to Domnall in the Annals of Ulster is for 628, a report of the battle of Both where Domnall was defeated by the reigning High King, his distant Uí Néill cousin Suibne Menn of the Cenél nEógain. Shortly after, Suibne Menn was killed by Congal Cáech, the Dál nAraidi king of the Ulaid. Later in the year Domnall took his army raiding into Leinster. Success in warfare was the usual test of a new king, and afterwards the Annalists assume Domnall was acknowledged as High King.

In 629, the Annals tell of battles at Fid Eóin and Dún Ceithirn, although it is not clear which was fought first. At Fid Eóin, Máel Caích mac Sgannail defeated the army of the Dál Riata, clients of the Cenél Conaill. The king of Dál Riata, Connad Cerr, and two grandsons of Áedán mac Gabráin were killed in the defeat. At Dún Ceithirn, Domnall inflicted a defeat on Congal Cáech and the armies of the Ulaid and Dál nAraidi. In addition to the defeat of the Ulaid, constant enemies of the Cenél Conaill, Domnall's hold on power can only have been helped by fighting amongst the other kindreds of the Uí Néill, war amongst Cenél nEógain reported in 630, and between Clann Cholmáin and the Síl nÁedo Sláine in 634–635.

In 637, Domnall faced another challenge from Congal Cáech and the Ulaid. Congal was joined by Domnall Brecc, king of Dál Riata, and by the Cenél nEógain. Domnall was aided by the Síl nÁedo Sláine. The battle of Mag Rath (Moira, County Down) was a decisive victory for the High King and Congal Cáech was killed. On the same day as Mag Rath, the battle of Sailtír (off Kintyre), fought between Domnall's fleet, led by his nephew Conall Cáel mac Máele Cobo, and a fleet of the Cenél nEógain and Dál Riata, was won by the High King's forces. The Ulaid were not the main sufferers, however, as the Dál Riata are thought to have lost their lands in County Antrim as a result of the battle. Mag Rath was attached to the Buile Shuibhne, the tale of a fictitious Dál nAraidi king named Suibhne Gelt, which is probably much older in origin.

The Annals of Tigernach report the death of Domnall's wife Duinseach in 641. Domnall died at the end of January of 642, perhaps after a long illness. Domnall was followed as king of the Cenél Conaill by his nephew Cellach mac Máele Cobo. Domnall's sons included Óengus mac Domnaill (died 650), father of Loingsech mac Óengusso (died 703), high king of Ireland; Fergus Fanát, father of Congal Cennmagair (died 710), also high king; Ailill Flann Esa (died 666) as well as Conall and Colcu (both died 663).

== Notes ==
| Preceded by Suibne Menn | High King of Ireland died 642 | Succeeded by Cellach mac Máele Coba and Conall Cóel |
