= Takamuko no Kuromaro =

Scholar and diplomat of the Asuka period (died 654)

Takamuko no Kuromaro (高向 玄理; died 654) was a Japanese scholar and diplomat of the Asuka period.

Takamuko traveled to China with Ono no Imoko as kenzuishi representing Empress Suiko in 608 and remained in China for thirty-two years. Following his return in 640, he was awarded the title Kuni no hakase (国博士, "National Scholar"). Takamuko helped write the Taika Reforms in 645. He was sent again as an ambassador to China (kentōshi) and died upon his arrival in Chang'an in 654.

== See also ==
- Takamuko clan
