= Battle of Moira =

637 battle between High King of Ireland Domnall II and King of Ulai Congal Cáech

Date	Summer 637
Location	Disputed, likely near Moira, County Down 54°29′N 6°14′W
Result	Victory for Domnall II

Belligerents
Forces of the High King of Ireland	Ulaid, supported by Dál Riata as well as Scots, Saxons and Welshmen

Commanders and leaders
Domnall II, High King of Ireland	Congal Caech, King of the Ulaid †; Domnall Brecc, King of Dál Riata

Strength
Around 50,000	Around 50,000

Casualties and losses
Unknown	Heavy
- Location within County Down Battle of Moira (island of Ireland)

The Battle of Moira, also known as the Battle of Magh Rath, was fought in the summer of AD 637 by the High King of Ireland, Domnall II, against his foster son Congal Cáech, King of Ulaid, supported by his ally Domnall Brecc, King of Dál Riata. The battle resulted in a decisive victory for the High King and his army, and Congal Cáech was killed in the fighting.

The battle was reputedly fought near the woods of Killultagh just outside the village of Moira in what would become County Down. It was allegedly the largest battle ever fought on the island of Ireland, and resulted in the death of Congal and the retreat of Domnall Brecc. However, the location of the battle is not settled and some commentators identify the location as being a few miles outside Newry, County Down in the vicinity of the townlands of Sheeptown and Derrylecklagh near to the ancient rath known as the Crown Mound.

== Background ==
Ireland in the period was a patchwork of petty statelets, fused together and driven apart by tribal loyalties, often given to a state of war. Other realms from across the water in Great Britain and in particular Scotland frequently became involved in the affairs of Ireland, notably the Scottish branch of Dál Riata, which had originally been from north of Lough Neagh but expanded across to Scotland. Indeed, the tribal loyalties often spilled across the Irish Sea, where the same clans could be found on either side, especially in Scotland. Rivalries and alliances between the petty kingdoms changed frequently. For example, Dál Riata, which fought with Congal in this battle, had seen one of their kings killed by his brother at the Battle of Fid Eoin (either 629 or 630).

Congal himself had first established his power base in Dál Riata, where he became King, before being recognised as King of Ulaid in 627. His ambitions soon came into conflict with Domnall II, who became High King of Ireland in 628. Ironically, Domnall II only rose to such a position because Congal had defeated and killed the previous High King, Suibne Menn, (who was Domnall's distant cousin in the Uí Néill dynasty) in a previous battle.

Domnall at first launched a raid into Leinster in 628 to secure his authority as High King. Some primary sources state that Congal had initially become the Ard Rí following his defeat of Suibne Menn. It may be therefore that Domnall seized the position indirectly from his Ultonian rival. Regardless, the two had become enemies.

Domnall pressed this rivalry very quickly, and in 629 the two kings engaged each other at the Battle of Dún Ceithirn in what is now County Londonderry. On this occasion Congal was defeated and fled to Scotland to seek support, and Domnall was left unchallenged as the High King.

Throughout the 630s, Domnall continued to wage war on his rivals in the Uí Néill clan. In 637, however, Congal once again rose to challenge the Ard Rí, and enlisted the help of the Dál Riata to do so. Congal returned from Scotland, gathered his native Irish armies which were supported by a more diverse Dál Riata army consisting of many British soldiers, particularly Scots.

== Location ==
In 637, the settlement of Moira was substantially smaller than it is in present times. However, there was at the very least a motte (the mound of which can still be seen in the village). The area was also much more forested in the 1st millennium, with the existence of expansive woodland near the hamlet. The location may also have been outside Newry in an area that is today rich in historical monuments.

== Battle ==
Little is known about the actual battle itself. Domnall I of Dál Riata brought a more varied force to the fight. His army included Scots, Picts, Anglo-Saxons and Britons (Welshmen). There were about 50,000 men on either side. At least one side had a substantial cavalry force.

Congal and his army probably landed near Dunseverick on their return from Scotland. He possibly planned on marching to Tara, as one of the five main roads running from Tara, the High King's Road, ran north and ended at Dunseverick, where there was a bridge that crossed the Lagan located near modern Moira. Domnall II had gathered his army at Tara and he marched north to meet the enemy forces. Congal marched south to meet him. The two armies comprising 100,000 men in total met at Moira.

According to Sir Samuel Ferguson "there appears reason to believe that the fight lasted a week", at the end of which the defeated force fled towards the woods of Killultagh. The forces of Ulaid and Dál Riata were defeated, with Domnall of Dál Riata forced to flee north to his kingdom's holdings. Congal was killed in the course of the battle.

The scale of the battle was, however, confirmed in the 19th century when the Ulster Railway which ran through Moira was being constructed. The remains of thousands of men and horses were discovered during the excavations. When one considers that the survivors probably numbered quite considerably more, then the reputation of the scale of the battle becomes obvious.

== Aftermath ==
With the death of Congal in the battle the chance for Dál nAraidi and its local allies to undo the advances of Domnall had been thwarted, and the Ulaid had to endure the advances that the High King had made. They were not to be completely subjugated however. By contrast, the consequences were much more keenly felt for Dál Riata. The land defeat at Moira was coupled with a naval defeat on exactly the same day; at the Battle of the Mull of Kintyre the Ard Rí's fleet had succeeded in defeating Dál Riata's. As a result of both battles the High King's forces were able to occupy the Dál Riata lands in north Antrim, unprotected as they now were.

As a direct result of the battle, the Uí Néill dynasty became dominant in the north of Ireland. Their descendants would claim overlordship of at least some of the land until the Flight of the Earls almost a thousand years later in 1607.

Some of the townlands around modern Moira get their names from the battle, notably Aughnafosker, which in Irish means 'Field of Slaughter', as well as Carnalbanagh which means 'The Scotsman's Grave'. In the latter area there was a large stone pillar in a nearby field, which marked the burial site of many of the Scottish princes who were killed in the battle. However, the stone was removed by a farmer in the late 19th century.
