= Connad Cerr =

Connad Cerr (Connad the Left-handed) was a king of Dál Riata in the early 7th century. He was either a son of Conall mac Comgaill or of Eochaid Buide. Connad appears to have been joint king with Eochaid Buide in the 620s.

He is named as king of Dál Riata in 627 when he won a victory over Fiachnae mac Demmáin, king of the Ulaid at the Battle of Ard Corann. Connad was killed at Fid Eóin, fighting against the Dál nAraidi led by Máel Caích, brother of Congal Cáech. While the Annals of Ulster have the battle in 629 and the Annals of Tigernach in 630, both place the death of Connad before the death of Eochaid Buide.

Connad's son Ferchar was later king. An entry in the Book of Ballymote associates Connad's descendants with "the men of Fife".

Preceded by Eochaid Buide	King of Dál Riata jointly before 627 – 629; With: Eochaid Buide	Succeeded by Eochaid Buide
