= Congal Cáech =

Monarch of ancient Ireland

Congal Cáech (also Congal Cláen) was a king of the Cruthin of Dál nAraidi in the medieval Irish province of Ulaid, from around 626 to 637. He was king of Ulaid from 627–637 and, according to some sources, High King of Ireland.

== Origins ==
While Irish history in this period is replete with the names of persons, about whom little is usually known save for their ancestry and the date and manner of their death, no early source preserves Congal's ancestry. According to later materials Congal was the son of Scandal Sciathlethan and grandson of Fiachnae mac Báetáin. In the 6th and 7th centuries the Dal nAraide were part of a confederation of Cruithne tribes in Ulaid (Ulster) and were the dominant members. The main ruling line of the Dal nAraide was known as the Uí Chóelbad based in Mag Line, east of Antrim town in modern county Antrim. It is possible that Congal did not belong to this branch of the Cruithne but some other rival branch and so would not be the grandson of Fiachnae who was of this branch.

The Fled Dúin na nGéd makes Congal a grandson of Eochaid Buide, King of Dál Riata, which is unconfirmed by other sources but chronologically feasible although it contains an anachronism in that Eochaid Buide's death is recorded years before the Battle of Mag Rath. This would make Congal the son of his ally Domnall Brecc's sister.

== King of Ulaid ==
Congal is presumed to have become king of the Dál nAraidi in 626 following the death of Fiachnae, but he is unlikely to have ruled as king of the Ulaid until some time after the death of Fiachnae mac Demmáin in 627. He first appears in the record in 628, when he killed Suibne Menn of the Cenél nEógain, supposedly High King of Ireland, at Traig Bréni on the shore of Lough Swilly. This killing may have opened Congal's way to becoming king of the Ulaid, but it also brought Domnall mac Áedo of the Cenél Conaill, Congal's nemesis, to the headship of the Northern Uí Néill. According to the Fled Dúin na nGéd, Domnall was the foster-father of Congal. Domnall had clashed with Suibne earlier that year and it is possible that Domnall and Congal were acting in concert.

This same saga records a slight that Congal suffered at the feast which seems to have turned him against his foster-father. In 629 they clashed and Congal was defeated by Domnall mac Áedo at the Battle of Dún Ceithirn (Duncairn, near Coleraine, modern County Londonderry) and fled the field of battle.

In 629, the Dal nAraide appear to have defeated the Dál Riata at Fid Eóin, killing Connad Cerr, although the victor is named as Maél Caích, perhaps an otherwise unknown brother of Congal. As well as their king, the Dál Riata suffered the loss of two grandsons of Áedán mac Gabráin and the Bernician exile Osric (perhaps a son of Æthelfrith) was also killed. It is possible that upon becoming King of Ulaid, Congal resigned the affairs of Dal nAraide to Maél Caích mac Scandail who met opposition from other Criuthne led by Dícuil mac Echach who may have been a member of the Latharna of Larne (a Dal nAraide tribe).

== King of Tara ==
Congal's bid for the kingship of Tara must have occurred after 629. Events in the midlands in the years 633–634 saw Congal's allies the Clann Cholmáin win a number of victories in Leinster and Meath which may be connected with the period of Congal's high kingship. Congal may have also supported the Cenél maic Ercae in their feud with the Cenél Feradaig branch of the Cenél nEógain.

Congal's epithets cáech and cláen mean "squinting" or "half blind". An ancient law on bees in the Bechbretha, written within a generation of Congal's death, links these epithets with Congal being blinded in one eye by bees owned by Domnall mac Áedo. This, it says, put Congal out of the kingship of Tara. No later sources make Congal a High King of Ireland, which is largely the same as the kingship of Tara, but the Cath Maige Rath echoes the Bechbretha in claiming that the men of Ulaid demanded that the eye of the beekeeper's son – a son of the High King Domnall mac Áedo – be put out in repayment.

These tracts may have been part of a propaganda war against Congal who may have faced hostility from the Dal Fiatach and the main Uí Chóelbad dynasty of the Dal nAraide. In the period 635–636 the allies of Domnall mac Áedo seem to have got the better of Congal's allies. In 635 his allies the Clann Cholmáin suffered defeat by their rivals of the Síl nÁedo Sláine, who were allies of Domnall mac Áedo. This may have been the real reason for Domnall Brecc's alliance with Congal as his dynasty was allied to Clann Cholmáin. Domnall may have also been hostile to the Uí Chóelbad dynasty of the Dal nAraide. In 636 the assassination of the Cenél Feradaig king of Ailech failed to displace this branch in favour of Congal's allies the Cenél maic Ercae.

== Mag Rath ==
Domnall mac Áedo dominated events in the years that followed, until around 637, when Congal, together with Domnall Brecc of Dál Riata, challenged him at the battle of Mag Rath (Moira, County Down). Domnall mac Áedo was victorious and Congal was killed in the defeat. This battle appears in the Buile Shuibhne and is recounted in the Cath Maige Rath.

== Reputation and representations ==
Congal is the protagonist of the Fled Dúin na nGéd. He appears in the Cath Maige Rath.

Irish poet Sir Samuel Ferguson wrote a lengthy heroic poem on Congal, loosely based on the Fled Dúin na nGéd, entitled Congal: A Poem in Five Books (1907).

== Sources ==
The sources for Congal's life and times are limited and generally date from long after his death. The Irish annals are for this period believed to be largely based on an annal kept on the island of Iona, where Saint Columba had founded a monastery in the middle 6th century. These annals survive only in later copies. Of these, the Annals of Ulster and the Annals of Tigernach are generally considered to be the most reliable and representative of the original material. Congal does not appear directly in Adomnán's Life of Saint Columba, another early source for Irish history, but a number of his contemporaries do and it supplies some context for events. He is mentioned in the Early Irish Law tract Bechbretha—on beekeeping—written in the later 7th century; this purports to explain Congal's epithets.

He also appears in later and less reliable materials such as verse and prose tales, including the Cath Maige Rátha (The Battle of Moira) and Fled Dúin na nGéd (The Feast of Dún na nGéd, literally The Feast at the Fort of the Geese), both of which date from the Middle Irish period, perhaps the early 10th century for the Cath Maige Rátha and the 11th or 12th, perhaps later, for Fled Dúin na nGéd. Those genealogies which include Congal are contradictory.
