= Áed Uaridnach =

Irish king

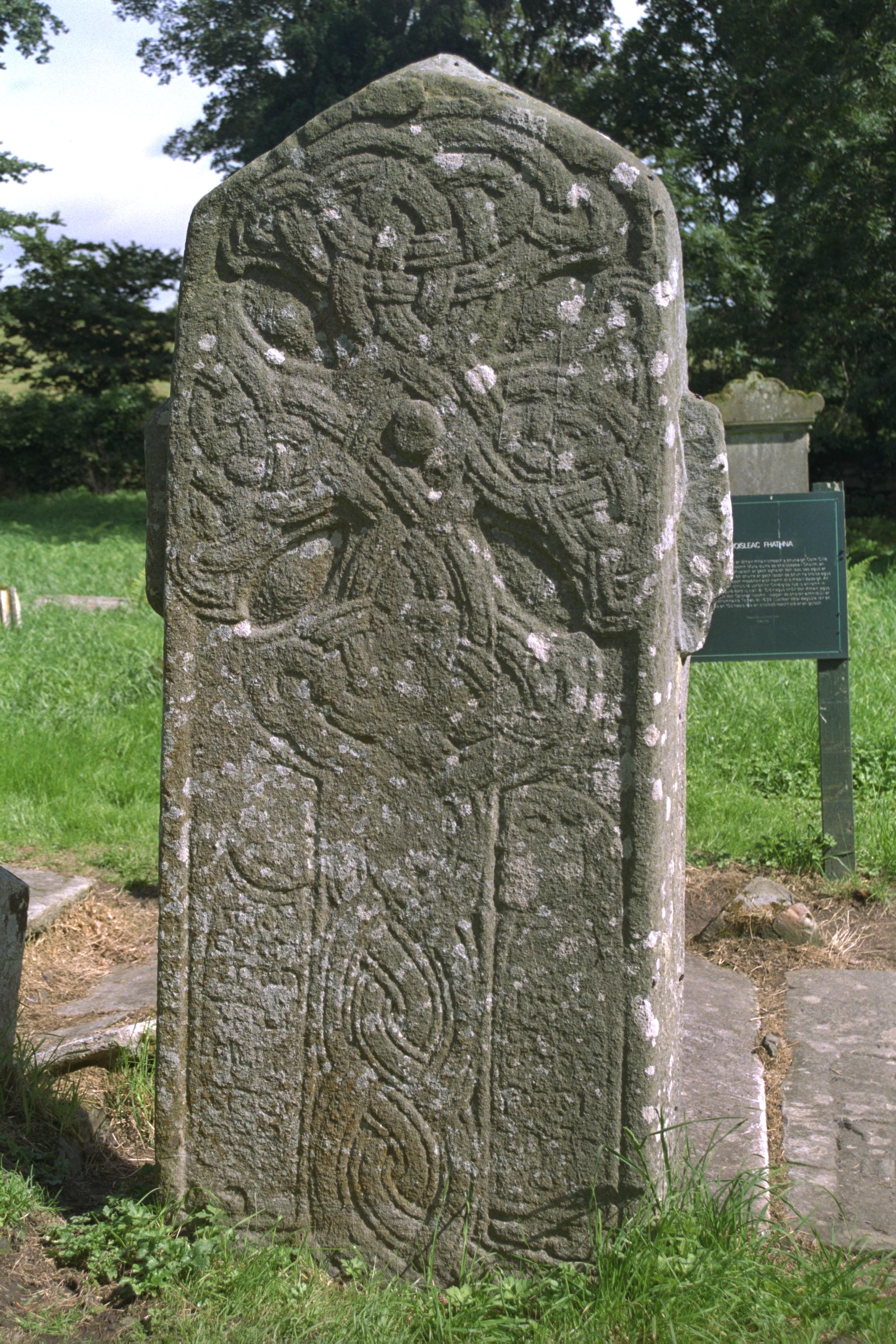
West face of the Fahan cross-slab, the figures at the bottom perhaps representing Áed Uaridnach and Saint Mura, founders of the church at Fahan

Áed Uaridnach ("Áed the Warlike", or Áed mac Domnaill, "Áed son of Domnall") (died 612) was an Irish king who was High King of Ireland. He is sometimes also known as Áed Allán, a name most commonly used for the 8th-century king of the same name, this Áed's great-great-grandson.

Áed was the son of Domnall Ilchelgach (died 566) and brother of Eochaid mac Domnaill (died 572), considered to have been High Kings by some sources. He belonged to the northern Cenél nEógain kindred of the Uí Néill. He was King of Ailech from 604 to 612.

Áed, it was said, was preceded as High King by the joint rule of Áed Sláine and Colmán Rímid and ruled from 604 to 612. Áed is mentioned in the earliest Irish King list contained in the Baile Chuind (The Ecstasy of Conn), a late 7th-century Irish poem. In 605 Áed won a victory over the King of Leinster, Brandub mac Echach (died 605) at the Battle of Slabra. Leinster was often a target of the Uí Néill for inaugural raids and the levy of a cattle-tribute. The Annals of Tigernach place the beginning of his reign after this event.

The cause of Áed's death is unknown, but his obituary presents it as a non-violent death. According to one recension of The Book of Invasions he "died of plague in Tara". The Cenél Feradach, led by the descendants of Suibne Menn, overshadowed Áed's branch of the Cenél nEógain—the Cenél maic Ercae—and it was not until the time of his great-grandson Fergal mac Máele Dúin that the Cenél maic Ercae again provided a High King of Ireland. Áed's son Máel Fithrich mac Áedo (died 630) was a king of Ailech.
