= Erca ingen Loarn =

Erc ingen Loarn
- Born: c. mid 5th century Scotland
- Died: c. 6th century England
- Spouses: Muiredach mac Eógain; Fergus mac Conaill
- Issue: Muirchertach mac Ercae

Erc ingen Loarn (sometimes Latinized as Erca to distinguish her from her grandfather Eirc mac Eochaid) was a queen consort of Ailech, best known as the eponymic mother of Muirchertach mac Ercae, a High King of Ireland. She is described by Thomas Charles-Edwards as having been "obviously legendary", in part due to a mention of her in the Banshenchas.

== Life ==
Erca was born, along with her sister Pompa, (Note: Her name has also been given as Pompona, Babona or Bebona.) to an unknown mother and Loarn mac Eirc, a possible king of Dál Riata and a brother of Fergus Mór. She was married off to Sarran, a king in Britain, but eloped with Niall Noígíallach's grandson Muiredach mac Eógain, a king of Ailech, to Irish Dál Riata. This left Sarran to take Pompa as his wife; they had four sons, three of whom were saints.

In Ireland, Erca and Muiredach mac Eógain had four sons, including Muirchertach mac Ercae. After the death of mac Eógain, she married Fergus mac Conaill, another grandson of Niall Noígíallach. She gave birth to four sons in their marriage as well, including Feidhlimidh, the father of Saint Columba.

Dubhaltach Mac Fhirbhisigh details in his Leabhar na nGenealach Erca's death after a pilgrimage from Irish Dál Riata back to Britain. There she met her son-in-law, Saint Cairneach, who blessed her, told her half of Ireland's future kings would be her descendants, and promised her entry into heaven. Mac Fhirbhisigh writes that after Cairneach performed ecclesiastical ministrations ("friothaileamh eaglurdachta") on her, she died.
