= Colcu =

Colcu may refer to:

- Colcu mac Domnaill (d. 580), king of Ailech
- Colgú mac Faílbe Flaind (d. 678), king of Munster
- Colcú mac Bressail (d.722), father of Áed mac Colggen, king of Leinster
- Colcu ua Duinechda (d. 796), abbot of Clonmacnoise
- Colcu mac Connacan (d. 884), abbot of Kinnitty
- Çölçü, a 2012 Azerbaijani drama film
