= King Bagdemagus =

Character in Arthurian legend

Bademagu / Bagdemagus
- Matter of Britain character
- His attributed arms in prose cycles
- First appearance: Lancelot, the Knight of the Cart
- Created by: Chrétien de Troyes
- Based on: Possibly Baeddan (Máel Umai?), Bômer

In-universe information
- Title(s): Sir, King
- Occupation: King of Gorre, Knight of the Round Table
- Significant other: Pellinore's wife
- Children: Maleagant, daughter(s)
- Relatives: Urien
- Origin: Kingdom of Gorre
- Nationality: Briton

Bagdemagus (pronounced /ˈbægdɛˌmægəs/), also known as Bademagu and by many other name variants, is a recurring character in the Arthurian legend. He is usually depicted as the king of the land of Gore (Gorre, Goere) and often as a Knight of the Round Table.

He originally figures in the Arthurian literature as the father of Maleagant, who abducts King Arthur's wife, Queen Guinevere, in several versions of this popular Arthurian motif. He first appears in French sources, but his character may have developed from the earlier Welsh traditions of Guinevere's abduction, as suggested by the distinctly otherworldly portrayal of his realm. In early versions, he is depicted as a kinsman and ally of Arthur and as a wise and virtuous king, despite the actions of his son. In later versions, his connection to Maleagant disappears entirely.

== Origins ==
He is introduced in the Old French works of the late 12th century, but the principal episode in which he appears, the story of the abduction of Guinevere, derived from significantly older traditions. Caradoc of Llancarfan's early 12th-century Latin Life of Gildas includes an episode in which she is kidnapped and taken to the Isle of Glass (i.e. Glastonbury Tor) by Melwas, King of the Summer Country, who is generally understood to be the original of Maleagant (Meliagrant), his son in the French works. Some other texts testify to the early popularity of this story; a version of it is alluded to in the Welsh poem known as "The Dialogue of Melwas and Gwenhyfar", which survives in two variants, and a Meloas, lord of the Isle of Glass, is mentioned in Chrétien de Troyes' French romance Erec and Enide.

Chrétien's Bademagu might have originated with Baedan (or Baeddan), mentioned as the father of Maelwys in the early 12th-century Welsh romance Culhwch and Olwen. This identification is supported by the proposal by E. K. Chambers that Maelwys is an alternate spelling of Melwas. Rachel Bromwich and John Rhýs connected Maelwys with the historical Irish prince Máel Umai mac Báetáin, son of Báetán mac Muirchertaig. Another theory points to the hagiography of Saint Bômer, also known as Bohamadus or Baumadus, from near Gorron in Normandy.

== Legend ==
Text	Names
Of Arthour and of Merlin	Baldemagu, Bandamagu
King Artus	Bano of Magoç
Lancelot, the Knight of the Cart	Bademagu, Bademaguz
Lancelot-Grail (Vulgate) Cycle	Bademagu, Bademagus, Bademaguz, Baldemagu, Baldemagus, Bandemagu, Bandemagus, Bandomag, Baudemagu, Baudemagum, Baudemagus
Lancelot of the Laik	Brandymagus
Merlin (English prose)	Badmagn, Bandemagn, Bandemagu, Bawdemagn
Merlin (Lovelich)	Baudagu, Baudemagw, Baudemagws, Beudamagw
Stanzaic Morte Arthur	Bangdemagew
Le Morte d'Arthur	Bagdemagus, Basdemegus, Bawdemagus
Parzival	Poidikonjonz ("von Gors")
Post-Vulgate Cycle	Baladro del Sabio Merlín: Bandemagus; Demanda do Santo Graal: Bandemaguz
Second Continuation of Perceval, the Story of the Grail	Bagomedés, Bagommedes
Sone de Nansai	Baudemagus
Belarusian Tristan	Bandemagul, Bendemagul
Prose Tristan	Baldemagu, Bandemagu
Tristano Panciatichiano	Bandemagus
La Vengeance Raguidel	Bandemagu, Bagdemagu

The character first appears in Chrétien's Lancelot, the Knight of the Cart, where Bademagu is the king of Gor[r]e, a mysterious land connected to Logres only by a bridge as sharp as a sword, and here many people from Logres are kept prisoner. His son abducts Guinevere, who is later rescued by the hero Lancelot with his help.

The story from Chrétien's Lancelot was rewritten, devoid of supernatural overtones, in the Vulgate Cycle. Here, he is initially an antagonistic character, fighting against Arthur together with his uncle Urien and later with Galahaut. Later, he fights for Arthur against Claudas, and also comes close to being cruelly killed by Pellinore when the latter finds out about the romance of him and his wife, but he is rescued by Gaheris. He eventually joins the Round Table at the age of 50 by taking the seat that had belonged to Ganor who was accidentally killed by Lancelot in a jousting tournament. He becomes a friend of Lancelot, who condemns his son's evil deeds and acknowledges that his death at the hands of Lancelot was deserved. Curiously, he is the King of Gorre at the same time as when Arthur's sister Morgan is described as the Queen of Gorre and lives there, but the connection between their characters and their status is not explicitly explained. After his death by Gawain (not described), Arthur mourns him more than any other knight lost during the Grail Quest.

He is a very different character in the Post-Vulgate Cycle, in which he is a companion of Gawain and Yvain. Previously, he had also been the one who discovered the fate of Merlin in the course of his knight errant adventures having left the Round Table in anger after the admission of Tor, eventually becoming the King of Gorre. His death takes place in the Post-Vulgate Queste, after he discovers Mordred raping a young girl and promptly wounds him in a duel. Gawain, not knowing the identity of the knight who injured his brother, pursues him and gives him a mortal injury, but then despairs upon discovering the truth; he forgives Gawain before dying.

In the Stanzaic Morte Arthur, he survives the Grail Quest and joins Lancelot's faction against Arthur in the civil war over Guinevere. In Thomas Malory's Le Morte d'Arthur, the link between him and 'Sir Meleagraunce' disappears (although he remains a cousin of 'Urien reduced to a minor character, linked to Malory's version of Galehaut and likewise as a foe of Lancelot instead of his friend. He later becomes a "full good knight" and succeeds in joining the Round Table, but eventually he is somehow (without elaboration) killed by Gawain; Malory, apparently in error, then brings him back as one of Gawain's companions.

In both Chrétien and Malory, he has an unnamed daughter who is an ally and friend of Lancelot, aiding his escape from respectively either Maleagant or Morgan in return for his helping her at another time. In Chrétien's Lancelot, she is mentioned as one of his daughters, suggesting that he has at least three children altogether. The Vulgate Lancelot turns her into his stepdaughter. He is also said to be the father of Meleagant and the son of Tadus in Sone de Nansai.

In The Arthurian Companion, author Phyllis Ann Karr gave two separate entries to "BADEMAGU, KING OF GORE" and "BAGDEMAGUS (Baudemagus), KING OF GORE": "While the Bademagu who appears in Chrétien's Lancelot clearly became the Bagdemagus of later romances [...] I find no suggestion that Chrétien's Bademagu would ever become a vassal of Arthur or any other earthly king, let alone one of Arthur's company of Round Table champions. Bademagu is too self-contained and, quite possibly if not probably, too unearthly."

== Modern Arthuriana ==
Vera Chapman's novel The King's Damosel has Bagdemagus (or rather just his namesake) as a villain.

== Sources ==
- Bromwich, Rachel, and Evans, D. Simon (1992). Culhwch and Olwen: An Edition and Study of the Oldest Arthurian Tale. University of Wales Press.
- Loomis, Roger Sherman (1997). Celtic Myth and Arthurian Romance. Academy Chicago Publishers. ISBN 0-89733-436-1.
