= Erc of Dalriada =

- King of Dalriada (possibly)
- Reign: 439 until 474
- Died: c. 474
- Issue: Fergus Mór, Loarn and Oengus.
- Father: Eochaid Muinremuir

Erc was king of Irish Dál Riata from 439 until 474, succeeding Eochaid Muinremuir. He was the father of three sons: Fergus Mór, Loarn and Oengus. He also may have been the great-grandfather of Muirchertach mac Muiredaig. Confusion arises from the latter's matronym, Macc Ercae, said to come from his legendary mother Erc ingen Loarn, daughter of Loarn mac Eirc. She married Muiredach mac Eógain. According to the Duan Albanach and the Senchus Fer n-Alban, Erc of Dál Riata's father was Eochaid Muinremuir, son of Áengus Fert, son of Fedlimid, son of Oengus, son of another Fedlimid, son of Senchormaich, son of Cruitlinde, son of Findfece, son of Archircir, son of Eochaid Antoit, son of Fiacha Cathmail, son of Cairbre Riata, son of Conaire Cóem and Saraid ingen Chuinn.

Suggestions that he was identical with Muiredach mac Eógain and thus belonged to the Uí Néill are based on late sources, such as the Annals of the Four Masters. In fact the Dál Riata are considered Érainn or Darini and claimed to be descendants of the famous Érainn king Conaire Mór. It is typical in late genealogies for unrelated peoples or those only related through marriage to be worked into a single genealogical scheme and all be made descendants of the same legendary founder.

Erc is significant as he has been traditionally regarded as the ancestor, through his son Fergus Mor, of the kings of Dalriada, and through them the Kings of Scotland, but more recently much of this tradition has been questioned.
