= Áed mac Ainmuirech =

Áed mac Ainmuirech (born c.530 – died 598) was High King of the Northern Uí Néill. He belonged to the Cenél Conaill and was a distant cousin of Columba of Iona. He was the son of Ainmuire mac Sétnai (died 569), a previous possible high king. His mother was Bríg, daughter of Chobtaig, son of Ailill, son of Nath Í, son of Crimthann mac Énnai son of Énnae Cennsalach of the Uí Ceinnselaig dynasty from Leinster. He was born in 530 according to the Annals of Tigernach (596.2).

He came to power some decades after the death of the last old, pagan style high-king of Tara, Diarmait mac Cerbaill (d. 565), after a period in which it is not clear that the Uí Néill had a high-king, nor is it certain that his contemporaries would have acknowledged Áed as such. The high kingship of Ireland rotated between the Cenél nEógain and Cenél Conaill branches in the late 6th century. It is difficult to disentangle the reign of Áed from that of his older second cousin Báetán mac Ninneda (died 586). Various lengths are given to the reign of Áed in the kinglists all of which would put the start of his reign before the death of Báetán. Both kings are omitted from the Baile Chuinn, the earliest Irish king list of the late 7th century, but this was probably a partisan document. It is possible that Báetán was not actually high king but was given this position by the synthetic historians to explain away the rule of Báetán mac Cairill (died 581) of the Dal Fiatach of Ulster as high king. The kinglists only assign him a reign of one year. Whether Báetán was king of Tara or not, the real effective power among the northern Ui Neill was Áed mac Ainmuirech.

He is known to have met with Áedán mac Gabráin, king of Dál Riata, in 575 at The Synod or Convention of Drumceat, to agree an alliance, presumably arranged by his cousin Columba. Áed and Áedán were both threatened by the activities of the Ulaid king, Báetán mac Cairill of the Dál Fiatach, and it served both interests that Dál Riata not be subjected to the ambitious Báetán. In this they succeeded. Áed may have become high king after this possibly in 576. It is also quite possible that this conference did not take place until circa 587 which is the date recorded in the Annals of Clonmacnoise. The death of Báetán mac Ninneda had occurred in 586 and the Annals of Ulster record two death dates for Báetán mac Cairill, one being in 587.

A challenge to the rule of Áed among the northern Ui Neill was launched by Colcu mac Domnaill of the Cenél nEógain branch. However they clashed at the Battle of Druim Meic Erce (Drumhirk, modern County Tyrone) in 580 and Colcu was slain. Then in 586, Báetán mac Ninneda was killed at Léim in Eich at the instigation of Colmán Bec (died 587), the southern Ui Neill king of Uisnech who was making a bid for the high kingship, and who may have made an earlier bid in 573. In 587 Áed ended this threat when Colman was slain at the battle of Belach Dathi.

Another challenge to Áed may have come from the direction of Ulster in the person of Fiachnae mac Báetáin (died 626) of the Dál nAraidi. At the royal conference at Druim Cett the affairs of Osraige had been discussed implying an influence by Áed over the affairs of Munster. In 597 Fiachnae won the Battle of Sliab Cua in the territory of Munster. Fiachnae had earlier won a battle over the Ciannachta of Brega in 594. There is a possibility that Fiachnae was a king of Tara in the 590's.

Áed came into conflict with Brandub mac Echach, King of Leinster from the Uí Cheinnselaig who was resisting Ui Neill encroachment. According to the saga tradition preserved in the Borúma Laigin (Cattle Tribute of Leinster), Brandub had killed Cummascach, the son of Áed for demanding the right to sleep with Brandub's wife during a royal tour. The annals record Brandub's killing of Áed's son Cummascach in 597 at Dún Buchat. However, at the battle of Dún Bolg (Dunboyke, modern County Wicklow) in 598, Áed was defeated and killed by Brandub.

Áed had close relations with his cousin Saint Columba. He may have commissioned a eulogy upon the saint's death and most likely granted the land for the monastery of Durrow. Áed was followed as king of the Northern Uí Néill by Colmán Rímid, son of Báetán mac Muirchertaig, of the Cenél nEógain. Áed's son Conall Cú mac Áedo (died 604) failed in a bid for the high kingship after his death but his sons Máel Cobo (died 615) and Domnall (died 642) were later high kings of the Northern Uí Néill.

== Notes ==
Preceded by Báetán mac Cairill or Báetán mac Ninneda	High King of Ireland after 581–594	Succeeded by Áed Sláine and Colmán Rímid
