= Colcu mac Domnaill =

Colcu mac Domnaill (died 580) was a member of the Cenél nEógain branch of the northern Uí Néill. He was the son of Domnall Ilchelgach (died 566) and grandson of Muirchertach mac Muiredaig (died 534) and brother of Eochaid mac Domnaill (died 572), considered high kings of Ireland. He ruled as King of Ailech from 572 to 580.

The high kingship of Ireland rotated between the Cenél nEógain and Cenél Conaill branches in the late 6th century. Áed mac Ainmuirech (died 598) of the Cenél Conaill was high king at this time. Colcu appears to have challenged Áed but was defeated and slain at the Battle of Druim Meic Erce (Drumhirk, modern County Tyrone) in 580.
