= 566 (disambiguation) =

566 was a year of the Gregorian calendar.

566 may also refer to:

- 566 (brand), a Taiwanese hair care brand
- 566 (number), the natural number following 565 and preceding 567
