= Muiredach mac Eógain =

Muiredach mac Eógain (died c. 489) was a King of Ailech and head of the Cenél nEógain branch of the Northern Uí Néill. He was the son of the founder of this dynasty Eógan mac Néill (died 465).

There is no mention of him in the Irish annals but the Laud Synchronisms give him a reign of 24 years as King of Ailech giving him an approximate reign of 465–489. He married Erca, daughter of Loarn mac Eirc of Dál Riata who was mother of his son Muirchertach mac Muiredaig (died 532), High King of Ireland, also known as Muirchertach mac Ercae and founder of the Cenél maic Ercae branch. Other sons included: Feradach, founder of the Cenél Fearadhaigh branch; Moan, founder of the Cenél Moain branch; and Tigernach, founder of the Cenél Tigernaich branch.
