= BnF Français 794 =

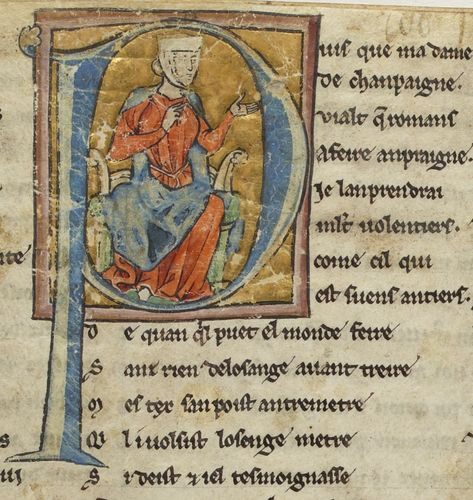
- Fol. 27r, top of second column. According to BnF Archives et manuscrits, the woman depicted is 'probably Marie de Champagne'.
- Date: mid-13th century
- Language(s): Old French
- Scribe(s): Guiot de Provins

BnF Français 794 (former shelfmarks Regius 7191.2 and before that Cangé 73) is a mid-13th century French manuscript, and one of only two manuscripts to contain the five romances of Chrétien de Troyes, (Note: That is, Erec and Enide, Cligès, Yvain, the Knight of the Lion, Lancelot, the Knight of the Cart and Perceval, the Story of the Grail. Philomena is not a romance. Guillaume d'Angleterre is only sometimes attributed to Chrétien de Troyes.) the other being BnF Français 1450.

The manuscript was transcribed by Guiot de Provins, who identifies himself on fol. 105r. The manuscript has been the subject of many studies, and is the basis for the citations for the Dictionnaire Électronique de Chrétien de Troyes, an online Old French dictionary, Furthermore, it contains copies of the Roman de Troie and Roman de Brut.

== Works ==
The manuscript contains 11 works

1. Li romans d'Erec et d'Enyde (Erec and Enide)
2. Li romans de Lancelot de la Charrete (Lancelot, the Knight of the Cart)
3. Li romans de Cliges (Cligès)
4. Li chevaliers au lyeon (Yvain, the Knight of the Lion)
5. D'Atys et Porfilias
6. Le Roman de Troie, Benoît de Sainte-Maure
7. Les estoires d'Engleterre (Le Roman de Brut, Wace)
8. Des empereors de Rome
9. Percevax le viel (Perceval, the Story of the Grail)
10. First continuation of Perceval
11. Second continuation of Perceval, Wauchier de Denain
