= Ainmuire mac Sétnai =

Ainmuire mac Sétnai (died 569) or Ainmire or Ainmere was a High King of Ireland from the Cenél Conaill branch of the Uí Néill. He was the great-grandson of Conall Gulban (died 464), founder of this branch. He ruled from 566 to 569. He was the first high king from the Cenél Conaill.

Before becoming high king, Ainmere is mentioned in a number of events in which he is allied to other northern Uí Néill princes. These were Forggus mac Muirchertaig and his brother Domnall Ilchelgach (died 566) of the Cenél nEógain, as well as Ainmere's cousin Ninnid mac Dauach (a member of the Cenél nDuach branch of the Cenél Conaill). The northern Uí Néill fought the Connachta at the Battle of Slicech (modern County Sligo) in 544/547 and slew the king Eógan Bél.

In 561 these northern Uí Néill princes allied with Áed mac Echach (died 577) of Connacht versus the high king Diarmait mac Cerbaill (died 565) of the southern Uí Néill whom they defeated at the Battle of Cúl Dreimne (County Sligo). According to the annals, Saint Columba organized this confederacy. The purpose of this battle may have been to ensure the succession to Diarmait for the northern Uí Néill.

In 563 these northern princes fought the Battle of Móin Dairi Lothair versus the Cruthin tribes in the north and crushed them. By this victory they expanded into modern county Londonderry to the River Bann. According to the report in the annals, Ainmere recovered the possessions of his father Sétnae.

Ainmere succeeded to the high kingship on the death of Domnall Ilchelgach in 566. The middle Irish king lists have misplaced his reign putting it later than the annalistic tradition but other king lists have him in the correct order. He is also omitted from the earliest list of Kings of Tara, the Baile Chuind (The Ecstasy of Conn), a late-7th-century Irish poem. He was slain by Fergus son of Néilléne (died 570) of the Cenél nEógain in 569. This Fergus was killed the next year by Ainmere's son Áed mac Ainmuirech (died 598) who was also a high king. According to Keating, Báetán mac Ninneda of the Cenél nEógain instigated the assassination. The Chronicum Scotorum records of Ainmire's death:

"Femhen, when he was king was not an ignoble place; today, crimson is its aspect from Ainmire, son of Senna."

Ainmere had married Brigid ingen Cobthaig of the Uí Cheinnselaig who was mother of his son Áed.
