= Maleagant =

Arthurian villain

Maleagant (varied spellings), or Melwas, is an often otherworldly villain and one of the earliest known characters from the Arthurian legend. In a popular episode, told in multiple variants, he abducts King Arthur's wife, Queen Guinevere, necessitating her rescue by Arthur and his knights—in a later tradition, notably by Guinevere's secret lover, Lancelot.

The earliest surviving version of this episode names the abductor as Melwas in the Welsh tales. As Maleagant, he debuts as Lancelot's archenemy in Chrétien de Troyes' French romance Lancelot, the Knight of the Cart, where he is depicted as a rebellious knight of the Round Table and son of King Bagdemagus. There, and in the following popular tradition, he is slain in a duel by Lancelot.

== Melwas ==
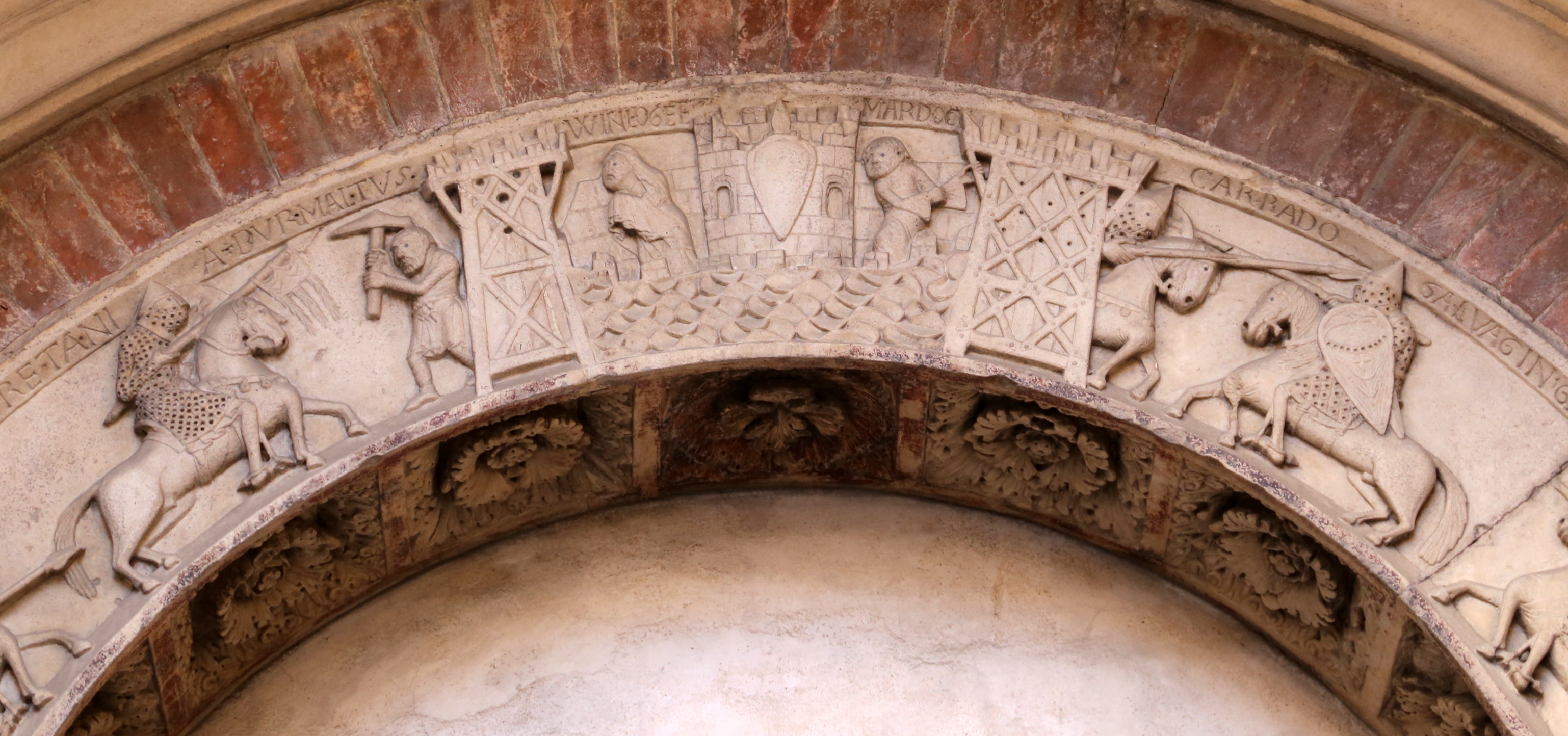
Depiction of "Mardoc" with "Winlogee" on the archivolt of Modena Cathedral's Porta della Pescheria

Roger Sherman Loomis regarded the form Maleagant or Meleagans as directly derivative of the Brythonic Melwas, calling it "a divine title probably meaning Prince Youth" and listing a number of later variants such as Melians de Danemarche. The earliest known account of the popular Arthurian motif of an abduction of Guinevere appears in the early 12th-century Latin Life of Gildas by Caradoc of Llancarfan. In that text, Melwas, king of the "Summer Country" (aestiua regione; a direct translation of the Old Welsh Gwlad yr Haf, according to Loomis a name for the Celtic Otherworld,) carries Guinevere (Gwenhwyfar) off to his stronghold, a "fortification of reed-beds and river and marsh", where she is kept and raped. After a year of searching, King Arthur locates her and prepares to storm the castle, but meanwhile Saint Gildas negotiates her safe return. An early 12th-century monumental carving on the archivolt of Modena Cathedral in Italy shows an apparently related scene where Arthur and his warriors besiege a castle where a character identified as 'Mardoc' sits with 'Winlogee', presumably Guinevere.

The fragmentary medieval Welsh poem Dialogue of Melwas and Gwenhyfer (Ymddiddan Melwas a Gwenhwyfar) calls him Melwas of the Isle of Glass (Ynys Wydrin), akin to the Welsh name for Glastonbury in Somerset. Chrétien de Troyes' Old French Erec and Enide (c. 1170) lists Maheloas, the "great" lord of the Isle of Glass (Ile de Voirre, described as a magical island where "thunder is not heard, no lightning strikes or tempest blows, no toads or snakes stay, and it is never too hot or too cold"), among the guests at Arthur's court. Geoffrey of Monmouth in his earlier History of the Kings of Britain (c. 1136) had him Latinized as Malvasius, similarly mentioned as a guest of Arthur but called the king of Iceland.

== Maleagant ==
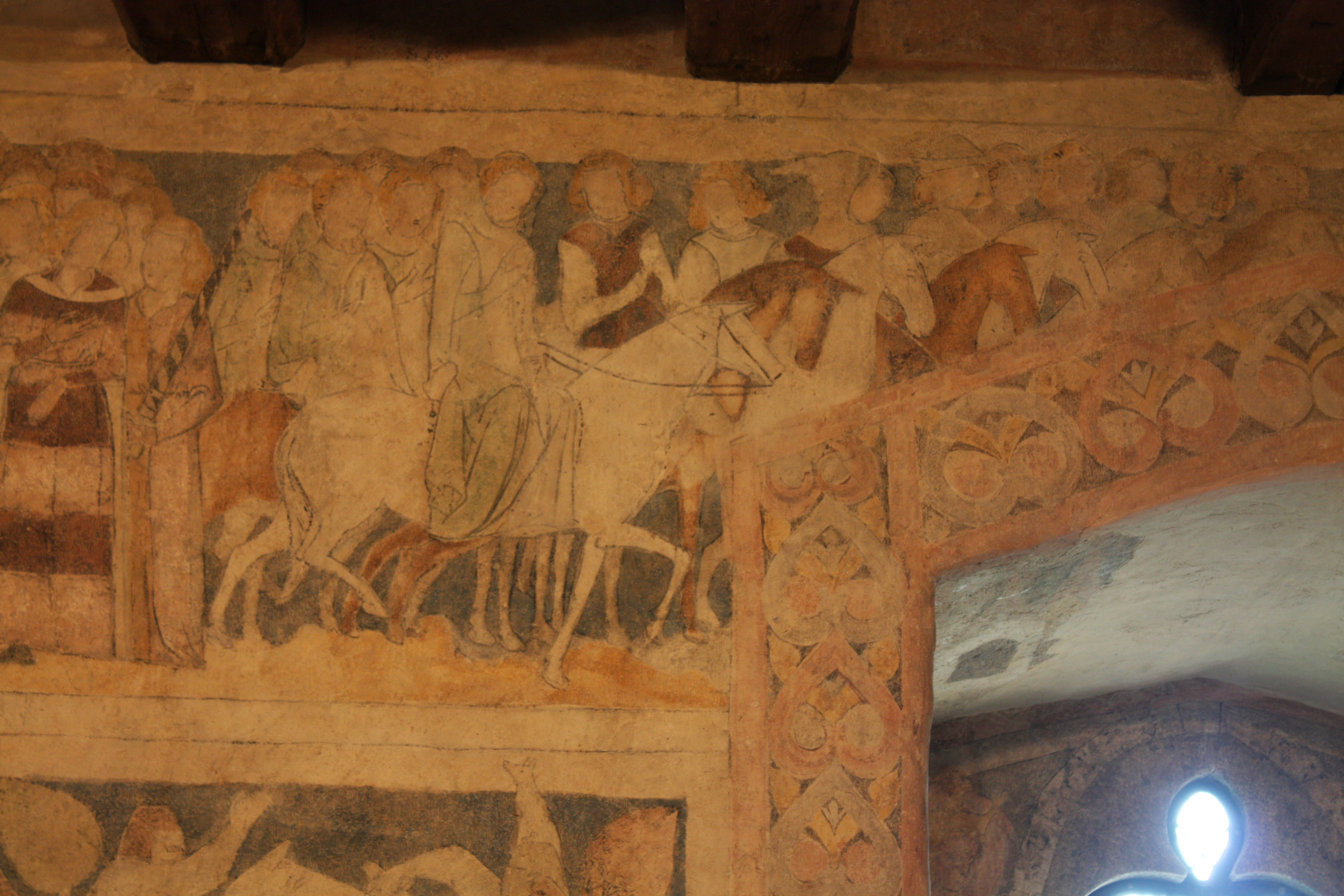
Maleagant's abduction of Guinevere depicted in a 14th-century Polish fresco in Siedlęcin Tower

As Maleagant (Maleaganz, Meleaganz, Meleagant, Meliagant, Melïagant, Meliaganz, Melïaganz), he first appears in Chrétien's Lancelot, the Knight of the Cart (written after Erec), where he is said to be the son of King Bagdemagus, ruler of the otherworldly realm of Gorre (the Land of No Return). He brings the abducted Guinevere to his impenetrable castle out of his one-sided love for Arthur's wife. The queen is eventually rescued by Lancelot and Gawain in the first major appearance of Lancelot in Arthurian legend. In this story, as finished by Godefroi de Leigni, he has multiple sisters, one of whom betrays him to save an imprisoned Lancelot, who had earlier helped her by beheading her enemy. He appears as Meljakanz (Meliakans, Meljacanz, Meljahcans, Meljahkanz, Meljakans) in Parzival by Wolfram von Eschenbach, where he apparently survived the duel with Lancelot and continues his villainy. He also appears as Meljaganz in Hartmann von Aue's Iwein, where he is a daring foreign knight who takes Guinovere (Ginover) to challenge the Round Table before he is defeated by Gawain (Gawein), and as the non-villainous Miljanz in Wirnt von Gravenberg's Wigalois.

His role seems to have diminished as Mordred became more popular. Nevertheless, he has continued to appear in most accounts of Guinevere's kidnapping. Notably, he plays that part in the Lancelot-Grail Cycle, as Meleagant (Meleagan, Meleagans, Meliagans, Meliagant, Meliaganz), and consequently in Thomas Malory's Le Morte d'Arthur. In Malory's telling, appearing as Meliagrance (Meleagraunce, Meliagaunt, Meliagraunce, Mellyagraunce), he kidnaps Guinevere and her unarmed knights and holds them prisoner in his castle in Gore. After Maleagant's archers kill his horse, Lancelot has to ride to the castle in a cart in order to save the queen. Knowing Lancelot was on his way, Meliagrance pleads with Guinevere for mercy, which she grants and then forces Lancelot to stifle his rage against Meliagrance. Later, Meliagrance learns of Guinevere's unfaithfulness to Arthur and is willing to fight in a duel at Arthur's court in an attempt to prove it to others. After Guinevere makes it known that she wants Meliagrance dead, Lancelot kills him even though Meliagrance begs for mercy. Meliagrance is killed after he agrees to continue fighting with Lancelot's helmet and left side body armour removed and left hand tied behind his back. (Lancelot felt it necessary to finish the bout, but would not slay Meliagrance unless Meliagrance agreed to continue fighting).

In the romance Sone de Nansai, the hero Sone visits an island said to once have been Meleagan's, whose father was Baudemagus; his grandfather was named Tadus. Meleagan's island is perfectly square and its walls are made of crystal; there is a palace at each corner and a fountain wells up through a gilded copper horn at the centre. The Sword Bridge connects the island to a causeway, a bowshot away, which leads to the mainland. In Meleagan's times, many men were beheaded there.

== Modern Arthuriana ==
Maleagant appears in many modern retellings of the Arthurian legend, including in John Erskine's Galahad, in Howard Pyle's The Story of Sir Launcelot and His Companions (1907) as Sir Mellegrans, in T. H. White's The Once and Future King (1958) as Sir Meliagrance, and in Thomas Berger's Arthur Rex (1978) as Sir Meliagrant.

- In the aftermath of the battle at the end of Mark Twain's classic novel A Connecticut Yankee in King Arthur's Court, the protagonist, time-travelling American Hank Morgan, tries to help the severely wounded Sir Maleagant, but is stabbed by him.
- In The Warlord Chronicles novels by Bernard Cornwell, Melwas is the king of the tribe of the Belgae, who inhabited the region roughly corresponding to modern Hampshire with its capital at Venta Belgarum (modern Winchester). He is a vassal to King Uther Pendragon (Arthur's father) and, after his death, to his grandson, the child-king Mordred, to whom Arthur serves as regent during his minority. He becames a member of the Round Table but betrays Arthur and raises against him.
- He appears in the 1995 film First Knight as its main villain Malagant, portrayed by Ben Cross. He is a murderous renegade knight of the Round Table who abducts Guinevere to get the throne and has Arthur mortally wounded before being killed by Lancelot.
- In the television series Kaamelott, Méléagant is a dark and mysterious entity, portrayed by Carlo Brandt. He seems omniscient, able to predict the future and appear in people's dreams, and his goal seems to push Lancelot to explore the darkest sides of his personality. Méléagant also pushes King Arthur and the Roman Emperor to suicide. As Arthur is on his death bed, he handles the power to Lancelot, still under the influence of Méléagant, who pushes Lancelot to establish a dictatorship over the Kingdom of Logres, while the surviving Arthur flees to Rome.
- Melwas appears in Giles Kristian's novel Lancelot as an antagonist of the title character from boyhood.

== Bibliography ==
- Lacy, Norris J. (1991). The New Arthurian Encyclopedia. New York: Garland. ISBN 0-8240-4377-4
