= Máel Umai mac Báetáin =

Máel Umai mac Báetáin (died c. 608) was an Irish prince, the son of Báetán mac Muirchertaig of the northern Uí Néill, who appears to have been a significant figure in early Irish tales. His father and his brother Colmán Rímid are both uncertainly reckoned High Kings of Ireland.

== Two reports ==
The Irish annals have two reports of Máel Umai. The first, in the Annals of Tigernach states that he fought alongside Áedán mac Gabráin of Dál Riata at the Battle of Degsastan where Áedán was defeated by the Northumbrian ruler Æthelfrith. According to the annals, Máel Umai killed Æthelfrith's brother, who is incorrectly called Eanfrith. Bede confirms the death of Æthelfrith's brother at Degsastan, giving his name as Theodbald, and adding that he was killed along with all of his retinue. Bede dates the battle to 603 and the Annals of Tigernach to 598. The second report of Máel Umai is the notice of his death, probably in 608.

== Irish tales ==
A list of early Irish tales includes the now-lost Echtra Máel Uma meic Báetáin (Adventures of Máel Umai mac Báetáin). Proinsias Mac Cana notes that the compiler of this list included this tale alongside another, also seemingly lost, concerning Áedán mac Gabráin, and a third dealing with the equally historical Mongán mac Fiachnai, concerning whom several unhistorical tales survive. He suggests that the subject of the tale may have been the battle of Degsastan. All three were involved in events in northern Britain in the years around 600 AD. Tales of Máel Umai were also known in medieval Wales, for he appears among a list of otherwise legendary Irish heroes taken from the tales of the Ulster Cycle which is included in Culhwch and Olwen.

Surviving genealogies refer to Máel Umai as "the fierce" and as a "war leader", leading Mac Cana to propose that he was remembered as a heroic warrior, similar to the legendary figures of the Ulster Cycle.
