= Forggus mac Muirchertaig =

Forggus mac Muirchertaig (died c. 566), also called Forrgus mac Maic Ercae, is included in most lists of High Kings of Ireland.

His father was Muirchertach mac Muiredaig, also called Mac Ercae, and his brother was Domnall Ilchelgach with whom he is said to have ruled jointly. He succeeded Diarmait mac Cerbaill, and was followed by Ainmuire mac Sétnai.

His death is recorded in Adomnán's Life of Saint Columba.

The less reliable evidence of the Irish annals records that he and Domnall defeated Eógan Bél, grandson of Ailill Molt, and then, c. 550, Éogan's son Ailill Inbanda further west, in the region of Clew Bay, modern County Mayo. He also fought Diarmait in alliance with Aimmuire.
