= Eochaid Muinremuir =

Irish king of dalriada

Eochaid Muinremuir was a possible king of Dál Riata in the early 5th century. He was the grandfather of the legendary king of Scotland, Fergus Mór, he also was the father of Erc of Dál Riata. Eochaid may have married Carthn Casduff, but, as with most information about Eochaid, this fact is obscure and uncertain. Eochaid was also thought to be the son of Áengus Fert.

== See also ==
- Dalriada
- Irish nobility
- Fergus Mór
