= Eochaid mac Domnaill =

Irish king

Eochaid mac Domnaill (died 572), also Eochaid Find ("the fair"), was an Irish king who is included in some lists as a High King of Ireland. He was the son of Domnall Ilchelgach (died 566) and grandson of Muirchertach mac Muiredaig (died 534), also considered high kings. He was a member of the Cenél nEógain branch of the northern Uí Néill. He ruled in Ailech from 565 to 571.

The high kingship of Ireland rotated between the Cenél nEógain and Cenél Conaill branches in the late 6th century. Eochaid ruled jointly with his uncle Báetán mac Muirchertaig (died 572) from 569. The middle Irish king lists have misplaced their reign putting it earlier than the annalistic tradition but other king lists have them in the correct order. They are also omitted from the earliest list of Kings of Tara, the Baile Chuind (The Ecstasy of Conn), a late 7th-century Irish poem. It is possible that the Ulaid king, Báetán mac Cairill (died 581), was the actual high king at this time.

In 572 the two kings were defeated and slain by Crónán mac Tigernaig, king of the Cianachta Glenn Geimin in modern County Londonderry.
