= Conall Cú mac Áedo =

Conall Cú mac Áedo (died 604) was a chief of the Cenél Conaill branch of the Northern Ui Neill. He was the son of Áed mac Ainmuirech (died 598), high king of Ireland.

Upon the death of his father in 598, rivalry broke out among the Ui Neill for his succession. Among the northern Ui Neill, Conall was defeated by his rival, Colmán Rímid (died 604) of the Cenél nEógain at the Battle of Slemain in 602 and was put to flight. Upon the assassination of Colmán, Conall was unable to take advantage as he died himself shortly thereafter.
