= Ewan Campbell =

Scottish archaeologist

Ewan Campbell is a Scottish archaeologist and author, who serves as the senior lecturer of archaeology at the University of Glasgow. An author of a number of books, he is perhaps best known as the originator of the historical revisionist thesis that the Dál Riata (the Gaelic people who later founded Scotland) did not originate from Ireland. He has also authored works about Dunadd and Forteviot.

== "Were the Scots Irish?" ==
The traditional narrative of Scottish history, is that the kingdom of Dál Riata was founded by Gaels from Ulster in Ireland, who crossed the Irish Sea after being squeezed by the ascent of Conn Cétchathach's descendants (a kindred, but competing line). This position is upheld in medieval Gaelic texts such as the Duan Albanach, which attributes to the a descent from Síl Conairi of the Érainn. This is held to be the means by which the Gaelic language came to northern Britain and where the clans who founded Scotland (i.e. - the MacAlpines) first entered the region. During the 2000s, advances in DNA studies confirmed the Dál Riata Scots as belonging to Haplogroup R1b, with the marker L1335 associated specifically with them.

Campbell authored a paper in 2001, named Were the Scots Irish?, in the journal Antiquity, which challenged the relationship between the Gaels of Ireland and those of Dál Riata. He stated that there is no archeological or placename evidence of a migration or takeover. This lack of archeological evidence was previously noted by English archaeologist Leslie Alcock. Archeological evidence shows that Argyll was different from Ireland, before and after the traditionally held migration, but that it also formed part of the Irish Sea province with Ireland, being easily distinguished from the rest of Scotland.

Campbell suggests that Argyll and Antrim formed a "maritime province", united by the sea and isolated from the rest of Scotland by the mountainous ridge called the Druim Alban. This allowed a shared language to be maintained through the centuries; Argyll remained Gaelic-speaking while the rest of Scotland became Brittonic-speaking. Campbell argues that the medieval accounts were a kind of dynastic propaganda, constructed to bolster a dynasty's claim to the throne and to bolster Dál Riata claims to territory in Antrim.

== Works ==
- Saints and Sea-Kings: The First Kingdom of the Scots (1999). Canongate. ISBN 9780862418748
- Excavations at Dunadd: An Early Dalriadic Capital (2000). Oxbow Books.
- A Crannog of the First Millennium AD: Excavations by Jack Scott at Loch Glashan, Argyll, 1960 (2005). Society of Antiquaries of Scotland: Edinburgh, UK. ISBN 9780903903363
- Continental and Mediterranean Imports to Atlantic Britain and Ireland, AD 400-800 (2007). Council for British Archaeology: York. ISBN 9781902771731
- Royal Forteviot: Forteviot in the 1st and 2nd Millennia AD (2012). Series: CBA Research Reports. Council for British archaeology: York. (Unpublished)

== See also ==
- Senchus fer n-Alban
- Annals of Tigernach
