= Lancelot, the Knight of the Cart =

12th-century Old French poem by Chrétien de Troyes

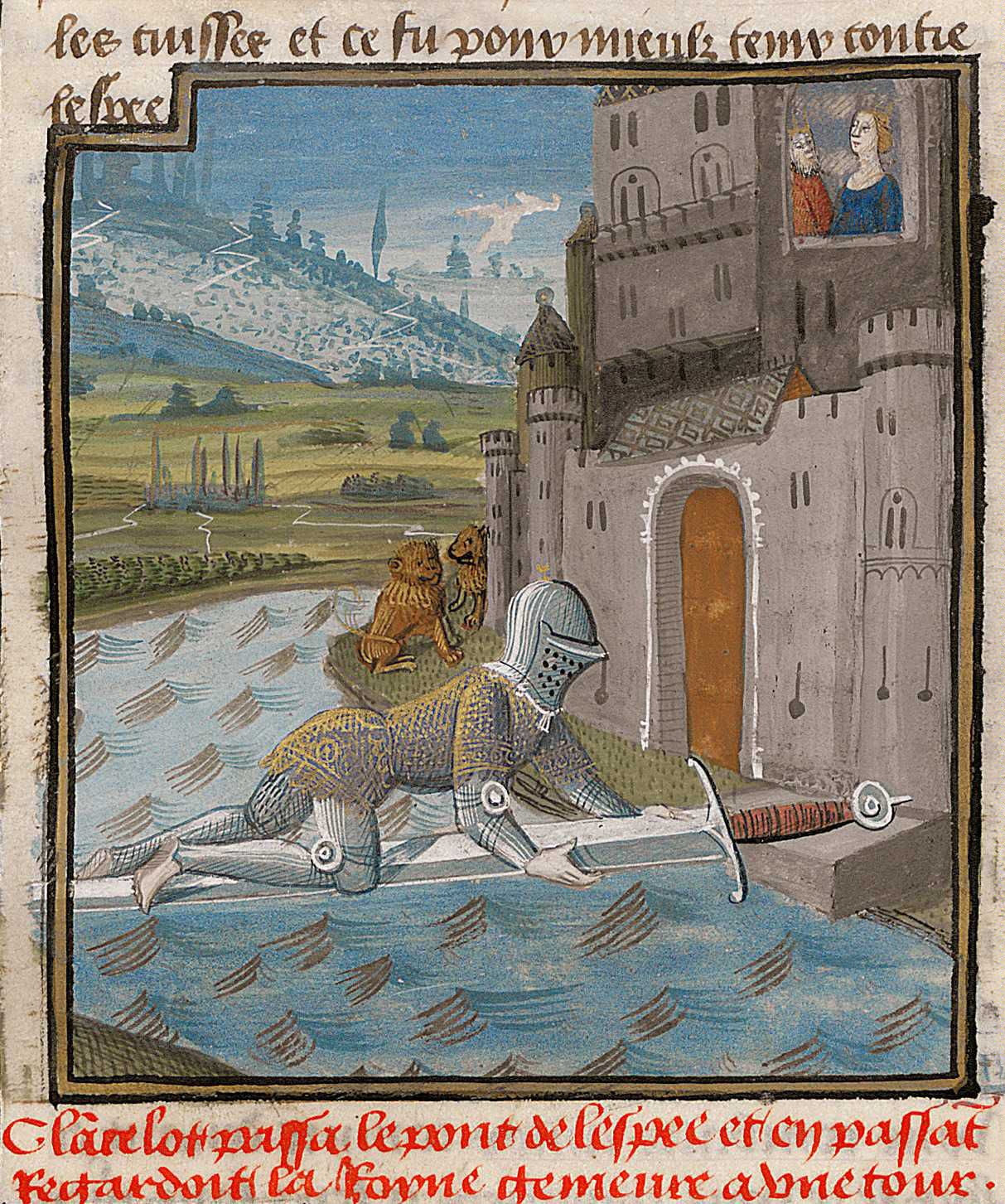
- Lancelot crossing the sword bridge (illumination in a manuscript produced for Jacques d'Armagnac, Duke of Nemours, in the workshop of Evrard d'Espinques, c. 1475)
- Original title: French: Lancelot, le Chevalier de la charrette
- Author(s): Chrétien de Troyes and Godefroi de Leigni
- Patron: Marie of France, Countess of Champagne
- Language: Old French
- Date: Between 1177 and 1189
- Provenance: County of Champagne
- Manuscript(s): BnF Français 794
- Genre: Chivalric romance
- Verse form: Octosyllable rhyming couplets
- Length: 7,134 lines
- Subject: Arthurian legend
- Setting: Logres and Gorre
- Personages: Lancelot, Maleagant, Guinevere, Gawain
- Text: Lancelot, the Knight of the Cart at Wikisource

Lancelot, the Knight of the Cart (French: Lancelot, le Chevalier de la charrette) is a 12th-century Old French chivalric romance poem by Chrétien de Troyes, although it is believed that Chrétien worked on a story given to him by Marie of France and he did not complete the text himself. It is the earliest known text to feature Lancelot as a prominent character, and the first to feature a love affair between him and King Arthur's wife Queen Guinevere.

The story centers on Lancelot's rescue of Guinevere after she has been abducted by Meleagant, the malevolent son of King Bademagu, the ruler of the otherworldly Kingdom of Gorre. It deals with Lancelot's trials during the rescue, and his struggle to balance his duties as a warrior and as a lover bound by societal conventions.

Chrétien's work impacted Arthurian legend, establishing Lancelot's subsequent prominence in Arthurian literature. He was the first writer to deal with the themes of the lineage of Lancelot, his relationship with Guinevere, their secret love and infidelity, and the idea of courtly love. In the 13th century, the story was incorporated in a greatly expanded form in the Vulgate Cycle.

== Plot ==
=== Lancelot, the Knight of the Cart (Chrétien de Troyes) ===
The book begins with Guinevere being abducted by Meleagant, who has tricked Arthur into allowing him to do so. After Gawain protests Arthur's decision to let them go, Arthur allows Gawain to pursue them. While Gawain is searching for the pair, he runs into the (then unnamed) Lancelot who, after riding his horse to death, convinces Gawain to lend him a horse in pursuit of the queen. Lancelot then speeds after Guinevere. When Gawain catches up to him, Lancelot has worn out his new horse to death just as he did his previous one. Lancelot encounters a cart-driving dwarf, who says he will tell Lancelot where Guinevere and her captor went if Lancelot agrees to ride in his cart. Lancelot boards the cart reluctantly as this is a dishonorable form of transport for a knight. Gawain, unwilling to demean himself in this manner, chooses to follow on horseback.

Along this journey they encounter many obstacles. Lancelot is derided by locals along his journey for having reduced himself to such a lowly stature by riding in the cart. His first trial comes when a maiden offers a bed for the knights, but refuses to let Lancelot lie on it. It is then revealed to be a trap to kill the knights. It does not alarm Lancelot, however, because after escaping the trap, he returns to sleep in the very bed in which the trap was set.

After further encounters with beautiful women and rude knights, Lancelot and Gawain decide to part ways so that they may cover more ground. Lancelot endures many trials, including battling three axe-bearing men, lifting a heavy slab of stone from a mysterious tomb, battling a foreign army from Logres, settling a dispute among those loyal to him over who may host him for the night, fighting against an overly prideful knight, and crossing an extremely sharp "sword-bridge" that divides Gorre from the outer world.

Lancelot finds Guinevere in the castle of Gorre, rescues her from Meleagant, but is driven away by her coldness, which is shown to be due to his hesitation to enter the cart. Lancelot leaves to find Gawain but is drawn back through his misadventures, and Guinevere apologizes for turning him away. Lancelot breaks into her tower and they spend a passionate night together. He injures his hand during his break-in, and blood from this injury stains Guinevere's sheets. Lancelot sneaks out of the tower before sunrise, and Meleagant accuses Guinevere of committing adultery with Kay, who is the only wounded knight known of nearby. Lancelot challenges Meleagant to a fight to defend Guinevere's honor. After Meleagant's father Bagdemagu interferes, Meleagant and Lancelot agree to fight in a year's time.

During this year, Lancelot is tricked by another dwarf and forced into imprisonment while Guinevere is allowed to return home. When it comes time to duel, Lancelot bargains with his captors to let him go and fight, and he promises to return. When Lancelot fights in the tournament, Guinevere asks him to lose in order to prove his love. He obliges, but when he begins to intentionally throw the battle, Guinevere changes her mind, now instructing him to win instead. Lancelot complies and beats the other tournament competitors, returning to his captors following the battle. Meleagant finds out from the captor's husband that the captor's wife was the one who agreed to release Lancelot temporarily (to fight at the tournament). He orders Lancelot to be locked away in a master craftsman's castle and Lancelot is imprisoned.

=== Lancelot Continuation (Godefroi de Leigni) ===
It is revealed that the woman whom Lancelot had much earlier saved from kidnapping (she ordered Lancelot to sever her stalker's head) was actually Meleagant's sister. She searches for Lancelot in order to return his favor. She finds an axe, and the rope used by Lancelot to pull up food, and sends up the axe instead. Lancelot chops his way out and escapes with her to a secluded home that she owns. Meanwhile, Gawain prepares to battle Meleagant, since Lancelot is missing (a one-year rematch after the second duel was established). Lancelot arrives on time and, at last, fights Meleagant, who loses his temper and his arm (to Lancelot's sword), and is subsequently beheaded by Lancelot. Guinevere tepidly embraces Lancelot (they are in public) in the end.

== History and influence ==
=== Dating and authorship ===
It is unknown when exactly the poem was composed. As posited by Anthime Fourrier, it could have been written around 1175—1181, that is before or at the same time as Chrétien de Troyes' own Yvain, the Knight of the Lion (Le Chevalier au Lion), the two serving as companion pieces with overlapping narratives. Claude Luttrell dated it later as between 1186—1189.

While little is known definitively about the life of Chrétien, many speculative theories exist based on his work. He was employed as a writer by aristocrats of Champagne, explaining the champenois dialect detected in his work, and he usually crafted stories based on material that was presented to him.

=== Lancelot ===
There is no known appearance or mention of an Arthurian knight named Lancelot (or similar) in the romances preceding Chrétien. Nevertheless, there are theories about his prior existence in an original "Ur-Lancelot" story (perhaps closer to that in the later Lanzelet that claims to be a direct translation from an unspecified French book), in which case such hypothetical prototype text could have been written around 1150.

Chrétien first mentioned a character named "Lanceloz del Lac" in his early Erec and Enide, listing him third among Arthur's knights after Gawain and Erec. Lancelot later briefly appears in Cligès, where he is defeated by Cligès in a joust.

=== Abduction of Guinevere ===
An abduction of the queen is one of the oldest motifs in Arthurian legend, appearing also in Caradoc of Llancarfan's Life of Gildas, and carved on the archivolt in Modena Cathedral. After Chrétien's version became popular, it was incorporated into the Lancelot-Grail Cycle as a minor but central part of the vast Prose Lancelot, and eventually into Thomas Malory's influential Le Morte d'Arthur.

=== Marie de Champagne ===
The Knight of the Cart contains a preface explaining how the story was assigned to him by Marie de Champagne, referring to her as "my lady of Champagne". Marie de Champagne was well known for her interest in affairs of courtly love and is believed to have suggested the inclusion of this theme into the story.

Chrétien credits Marie with providing the matiere e san (matière et sen in Modern French). Matiere is a cognate of the English word "matter". It has been translated as meaning the well-known story (in this case, the story of Lancelot). San is harder to translate. It's generally agreed to refer to the twist, the addition, or derivation (in this case, the affair).

=== Godefroi de Leigni ===
The Knight of the Cart contains a postface explaining that the story was completed not by Chrétien himself, but by the clerk known as Godefroi de Leigni. Godefroi's work begins after the episode of Lancelot's imprisonment in the tower.

A 12th-century French writer usually functioned as a part of a team, or a workshop attached to the court. It has been suggested that Chrétien did not finish the story himself because he did not support the adulterous themes.

=== Courtly love ===
The term was coined by the medievalist Gaston Paris in 1883 to help understand the relationship between Lancelot and Guinevere in The Knight of the Cart. Alexander J. Denomy describes courtly love as "a type of sensual love and what distinguishes it from other forms of sexual love, from mere passion […] is its purpose or motive, its formal object, namely, the lover's progress and growth in natural goodness, merit, and worth."

In The Knight of the Cart, Lancelot has become entranced by Guinevere and in more ways than one, is ruled by her. As the queen, Guinevere maintains power over the kingdom as well as Lancelot. When Meleagant questions their love and her adultery to the king, Lancelot challenges Meleagant to a battle to protect Guinevere’s honor. Lancelot has no shame in showing his affair with the queen: "Lancelot’s love explodes into romance without any beginning revealed or end foretold, fully formed and symbolized by the extraordinary fullness of his heart." This introduction of the love affair between Guinevere and Lancelot appears in many other stories after this poem was written.

== Sources ==
- Chrétien de Troyes; Owen, D. D. R. (translator) (1988). Arthurian Romances. New York: Everyman's Library. ISBN 0-460-87389-X.
- Colman, Rebecca V. "Reason and Unreason in Early Medieval Law." Journal of Interdisciplinary History 4 (Spring, 1974): 571–591.
- Grant, Edward. "Reason Asserts Itself: The Challenge to Authority in the Early Middle Ages to 1200." God and Reason in the Middle Ages. Cambridge: Cambridge University Press, 2001. ISBN 0-521-00337-7
- Lacy, Norris J. (1991). "Chrétien de Troyes". In Norris J. Lacy, The New Arthurian Encyclopedia, pp. 88–91. New York: Garland. ISBN 0-8240-4377-4.
- Roquebert, Michel. Les cathares et le Graal. ISBN 9782708953796
- Hopkins, Andrea. The Book of Courtly Love: The Passionate Code of the Troubadours. San Francisco: Harper, 1994. ISBN 0-06-251115-7.
- Condren, Edward I. "The Paradox of Chrétien's Lancelot." MLN (May, 1970): 434–453
- Paris, Gaston. "Lancelot du Lac, II:Conte de la charrette." Romania 12 (1883): 459–534
- Burns, E. Jane. "Courtly Love: Who Needs It? Recent Feminist Work in the Medieval French Tradition." Signs 27.1 (2001): 23–57.
- Chretien de Troyes. Arthurian Romances. Trans. William W. Kibler and Carleton W. Carroll. New York: Penguin Books, 2004.
- Noble, Peter. "The Character of Guinevere in the Arthurian Romances of Chretien de Troyes" The Modern Language Review July 1972: 524–535
