= Godefroi de Leigni =

Godefroi de Leigni was a clerk and an associate of Chrétien de Troyes during the 12th century, presumably at the court of Marie de Champagne. He finished Chrétien's romance Lancelot, the Knight of the Cart after Chrétien abandoned it for unknown reasons.

Godefroi was presumably born in the village of Leigni, now called Ligny, in the modern Belgian province of Namur, or was at least associated with it. Chrétien states at the beginning of Lancelot that Marie de Champagne had commissioned him to compose the poem, and Godefroi says at the end that with Chrétien's blessing, he has brought the work from line 6132, where Lancelot has been trapped behind a wall by Meleagant, to its conclusion some thousand lines later.

Most scholars have tended to believe Godefroi when he says he was following an outline left by Chrétien when he completed the poem (Chretien states he is following a text provided by Marie of Champagne). However, in 1989, David Hult advanced "the possibility that Godefroi is a fiction of Chrétien". Roberta Krueger also reads Godefroi as a scribal persona created by Chrétien himself, a "fictional clerkly-author figure conceived by the author Chrétien" to tie up his adulterous love plot in a homosocial literary bond that ignores the heterosexual tension the work has sought to create.

There has been much speculation about why Chrétien left the poem where he did. Some suggest that he, medieval France's greatest treater of married love, did not approve of the adulterous subject. Others hold that he was uninterested by a subject thrust upon him by his patroness, preferring to spend more time on Yvain, the Knight of the Lion, a poem he wrote at the same time as Lancelot.
