= Loarn mac Eirc =

King of Dál Riata

Loarn mac Eirc was a possible king of Dál Riata who may have lived in the 5th century. He was buried on Iona. Loarn's main significance is as the eponymous ancestor of Cenél Loairn, a kindred whose name is preserved in Lorne.

The Duan Albanach and the Senchus Fer n-Alban and other genealogies name Loarn's father as Erc son of Eochaid Muinremuir. Loarn appears in Irish traditions as 'King of Alba' in the eighth- to twelfth-century tale "Of The Miracles of Cairnech Here" in the Lebhor Bretnach, the Irish version of the Historia Brittonum, and in the tenth- to twelfth-century tale Aided Muirchertach mac Erca. In these tales, mac Erca spends time with Loarn, his grandfather, before murdering him by setting him aflame.
