= Báetán mac Ninneda =

Báetán mac Ninneda (died 586) was an Irish king of the Cenél Conaill, a sept of the northern Uí Néill. He was the son of Ninnid mac Duach (flourished 561–563) and great grandson of Conall Gulban (died 464). He was a member of the Cenél nDuach branch of the Cenél Conaill. He is counted as King of Tara in some sources.

The kingship of Tara rotated between the Cenél nEógain and Cenél Conaill branches in the late 6th century. It is difficult to disentangle the reign of Báetán from that of his younger second cousin Áed mac Ainmuirech (died 598). Various lengths are given to the reign of Áed in the king lists, all of which would put the start of his reign before the death of Báetán. Both kings are omitted from the Baile Chuinn, the earliest Irish king list of the late 7th century, but this was probably a partisan document. It is possible that Báetán was not actually high king but was given this position by the synthetic historians to explain away the rule of Báetán mac Cairill (died 581) of the Dal Fiatach of Ulster as high king. The kinglists only assign him a reign of one year. Whether Báetán was king of Tara or not, the real effective power among the northern Uí Néill from 572 was Áed mac Ainmuirech.

His death is recorded in the annals in 586 when he was killed at Léim in Eich (Lemanroy, Termoneeny parish, County Londonderry) at the instigation of Colmán Bec (died 587), the southern Uí Néill King of Uisnech who was making a bid for the high kingship. The annals give him the title King of Tara.
