= Colcu mac Connacan =

Irish historian and abbot (died 884)

Colcu mac Connacan (died 884) was an Irish historian and Abbot of Ceann Eitigh (Kinnitty).

The Annals of the Four Masters, sub anno 884, contains Colcu's obituary: "Colcu, son of Connacan, Abbot of Ceann Eitigh, doctor of eloquence, and the best historian that was in Ireland in his time ... died."
