= Guillaume d'Angleterre =

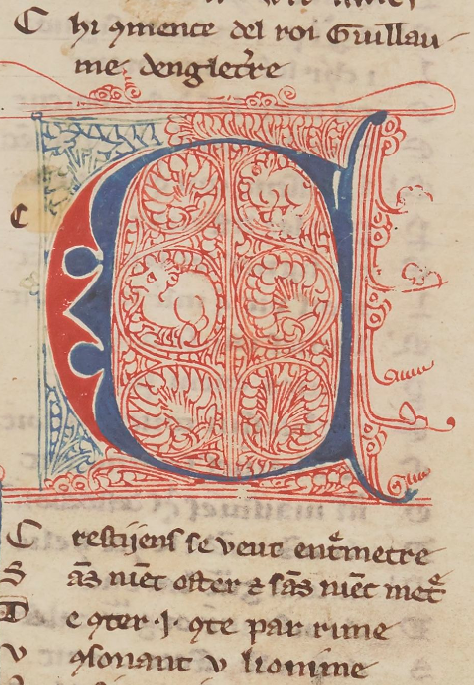
- Incipit and first four lines of the Bibliothèque nationale de France manuscript. Crestiiens is the first word of the first line.
- Author(s): Crestiiens
- Ascribed to: Chrétien de Troyes
- Language: Old French
- Genre: Epic poem
- Length: 3,310 lines

Guillaume d'Angleterre is a 12th-century epic poem in Old French, consisting of 3310 lines. The author identifies himself as Crestiiens on the first line of the poem, which has caused a great deal of debate in the romance philological community as to whether the author is Chrétien de Troyes.

== Plot ==
King Guillaume and his wife Gratiiene are good Christians. After years of waiting, Gratiiene gets pregnant. While she is heavily pregnant, Guillaume has a vision telling him to go into exile. While in exile, they take shelter in a cave and Gratiiene gives birth to twins.

The next day, Guillaume goes out to look for food and comes across a group of merchants. Instead of helping them, they take Gratiiene and the two children with them, leaving Guillaume behind. Guillaume witnesses one of the twins being taken by a wolf. The merchants pursue the wolf, and the child is found miraculously unharmed. Guillaume, however, thinks the child is dead.

Guillaume becomes a servant to another merchant. Meanwhile, Gratiiene, traveling with the merchants, meets a valiant knight called Gleolais. Gleolais's wife has died and he has no heir, so he asks Gratiiene to marry him.

The story now passes to the two children, called Lovel and Marin, who have been raised by two of the merchants, unaware that they're brothers. They rebel against their 'fathers' (as they believe them to be) and leave. On their travels, they encounter a king who asks them to join his court.

Guillaume travels to Bristol, England. When he attempts to leave, his boat is caught in a storm. Guillaume and his helmsman end up at an unknown port. The queen comes down from the castle to inspect their vessel and, upon seeing a ring he's wearing, realizes that he's her husband.

Guillaume decides to go hunting but accidentally crosses into an enemy kingdom. Two knights confront him and threaten to kill him. In order to stop them, he tells them he's a king and tells them his story. Upon hearing it, they realize that he's their father and that they are in fact brothers. They're reunited with Gratiiene, their mother.

== Authorship ==
F. J. Tanquerey said in 1931 that "the question of whether the Chrétien in Guillaume d’Angleterre is Chrétien de Troyes has already caused a lot of ink to be used". Tanquerey was writing in reply to Wilmotte's article, published 11 years earlier, in which he concluded that the Chrétien mentioned was Chrétien de Troyes. Tanquerey concluded however that he was not.

David Staines includes it in his The Complete Romances of Chrétien de Troyes, while Wendelin Förster includes it in his Christian von Troyes, Sämtliche erhaltene Werke (that is, the complete works of). The relatively recently released Christine Ferlampin-Acher edition (2007, Champion classiques du moyen âge) uses the title Chrétien de Troyes (?) Guillaume d’Angleterre. The Dictionnaire Étymologique de l’Ancien Français considers it to be 'wrongly attributed' to Chrétien de Troyes.

== Manuscripts ==
- Cambridge, St. John's College Library, B. 9, f. 55r-75v.
- Paris, Bibliothèque nationale de France, français, 375, f. 240v-247v. By two scribes, finished February 2, 1288.
