= Colmán Rímid =

Irish king

Colmán Rímid (or Colmán mac Báetáin) (died 604) was an Irish king who is included in some lists as a High King of Ireland. Colmán was the son of Báetán mac Muirchertaig (died 572), also considered to be a high king, and belonged to the Cenél nEógain branch of the northern Uí Néill. He ruled in Ailech from 578 to 602. His byname rímid means "the Counter", suggesting that he was numerate, unlike most contemporary kings.

The high kingship of Ireland rotated between the Cenél nEógain and Cenél Conaill branches in the late 6th century. He is said to have shared the High Kingship with Áed Sláine. The accession of Colmán and Áed to the high kingship is recorded in the annals in 598. They are also listed as kings in the king lists. They are however omitted from the earliest king list, the Baile Chuind (The Ecstasy of Conn), a late 7th-century Irish poem. Fiachnae mac Báetáin of Ulaid may have been effectively king.

In 602 Colmán defeated his Cenél Conaill rival, Conall Cú mac Áedo (died 604) at the Battle of Cúl Sleamna (in Raphoe barony) and Conall was put to flight. Colmán met his death in 604 when he was killed by a kinsman, Lochán Dilmana. The Annals of Ulster state of this:

Of what value kingship, of what value law; of what value power over princes; Since it is king Colmán the Counter whom Lochan Dithnadha has slain?

His daughter, or perhaps granddaughter, Fín, was the mother of Aldfrith son of Oswiu. The poet Cenn Fáelad mac Aillila (died 679) was his nephew. His brother Máel Umai (died 610) fought at the Battle of Degsastan where he is said to have killed the brother of King Æthelfrith of Bernicia.

Family tree of Colmán Rímid

Báetán mac Muirchertaig
Colmán Rímid	Máel Umai	Fergus	Forannán	Ailill
Fín ingen Colman	Oswiu of Northumbria	Cenél; Forgusa	Hui; Forannáin	Cenn Fáelad mac Aillila	Sabina
Aldfrith of Northumbria	Cuthburh of Wessex	Cuthbert of Lindisfarne
Osred	Offa	Osric	Osana

	Documented relationships
	Speculative relationships
italics	Family name
