= Báetán mac Muirchertaig =

Irish king

Báetán mac Muirchertaig (died 572), also Baetán Bríge ('Baetán the Powerful'), was an Irish king who is included in some lists as a High King of Ireland. He was the son of Muirchertach mac Muiredaig (died 534), also considered a high king. He was a member of the Cenél nEógain branch of the northern Uí Néill. He ruled in Ailech from 566 to 572.

The high kingship of Ireland rotated between the Cenél nEógain and Cenél Conaill branches in the late 6th century. Báetán ruled jointly with his nephew Eochaid mac Domnaill (died 572) from 569. The middle Irish king lists have misplaced their reign putting it earlier than the annalistic tradition but other king lists have them in the correct order. They are also omitted from the earliest list of Kings of Tara, the Baile Chuind (The Ecstasy of Conn), a late 7th-century Irish poem. It is possible that the Ulaid king, Báetán mac Cairill (died 579), was the actual high king at this time.

In 572, the two kings were defeated and slain by Crónán mac Tigernaig, king of the Cianachta Glenn Geimin in modern County Londonderry.

Báetán's son Colmán Rímid also appears as high king of Ireland in some lists. He had four other sons, Máel Umai, Forannán, Fergus and Ailill. His sons are given in The Laud Genealogies and Tribal Histories (ZCP Vol 8, P.294 Kuno Meyer) as follows: "Coic maic Baetáin maic Muirc[h]ertaig .i. Forgus, otáit Cenél Forgusa; Forannán, a quo Hui Forannáin; Ailill .i. athair Cindfaelad; Maelhumai .i. in rígfénid; Colman Rimid athair Fína máthar Flainn." The Annals of the Four Masters at 615.2 state, "Ailill, son of Baedan; Maelduin, son of Fearghus, son of Baedan; and Diucolla, were slain in Magh Slecht, in the province of Connaught. They were of the race of Baedan, son of Muircheartach."

Family tree of Báetán mac Muirchertaig

Báetán mac Muirchertaig
Colmán Rímid	Máel Umai	Fergus	Forannán	Ailill
Fín ingen Colman	Oswiu of Northumbria	Cenél; Forgusa	Hui; Forannáin	Cenn Fáelad mac Aillila	Sabina
Aldfrith of Northumbria	Cuthburh of Wessex	Cuthbert of Lindisfarne
Osred	Offa	Osric	Osana

	Documented relationships
	Speculative relationships
italics	Family name
