= Domnall Ilchelgach =

High King of Ireland

Domnall mac Muirchertaig (died c. 566), called Domnall Ilchelgach (Domnall of the Many Deceits) and Domnall mac Maic Ercae, was said to be a High King of Ireland.

Domnall was a son of Muirchertach mac Muiredaig, and belonged to that part the northern branch of the Uí Néill—the kindred name is probably anachronistic in his time and dates from perhaps a generation later—which would later be known as the Cenél nEógain. Together with his brother Forggus, and perhaps also their kinsman Ainmuire mac Sétnai, he is said to have been High King following the death of Diarmait mac Cerbaill, whose enemy they had been. The beginning of their reign is conventionally dated to c. 565, based on the testimony of the Annals of Ulster, but recent studies have suggested that this is several years too late and that the dates in the Annals of Tigernach are more reliable in this period.

Domnall, Forggus and Ainmuire, perhaps with the aid of Áed mac Echach, King of Connacht defeated Diarmait mac Cerbaill at the Battle of Cúl Dreimhne in the early 560s, but Diarmait retained his hold on power. His authority may have been strengthened by the decisive defeat which Domnall, Forggus and their allies inflicted on the cruithne of Ulster at the battle of Móin Daire Lothair in the year following Cúl Dreimne. Domnall and Forggus are thought to have been recognised as Diarmait's successors after Cúl Dreimne. Their joint reign was short, a battle in the lands of the River Liffey in Leinster being recorded shortly before Domnall's death in about 566.

Domnall's sons Eochaid and Áed Uaridnach were reckoned High Kings and the great majority of Cenél nEógain kings counted as High Kings of Ireland were his descendants.
