= Muirchertach mac Muiredaig (Mac Ercae) =

6th century High King of Ireland

Muirchertach mac Muiredaig (died c. 534), called Mac Ercae, Muirchertach Macc Ercae and Muirchertach mac Ercae, was said to be High King of Ireland in the 6th century. The Irish annals contain little reliable information on his life, and the surviving record shows signs of retrospective modification. The Aided Muirchertaig Meic Erca takes as its theme Muirchertach's supernatural death.

== History ==
According to the genealogies, Muirchertach belonged to the Uí Néill and was the son of Muiredach, son of Eógan, son of Niall of the Nine Hostages; hence Muirchertach mac Muiredaig. His mother, "obviously legendary" according to Thomas Charles-Edwards, was said to be Erca, daughter of "Lodarn, king of Alba". From the matronym comes his alternative name, Muirechertach Macc Ercae. However, Mac Ercae was a common enough male first name. The annalistic entries for Muirchertach span 50 years, from 482 to his death in 534, using various names, including Mac Ercae, so that it is more than likely that two or more people have been confused in the annals.

The first mentions of Muirchertach in the Annals of Ulster, in 482 and 483, associate him, under the name Muirchertach Macc Ercae, with the defeat and killing of Ailill Molt at the battle of Ochae, somewhere in the Irish midlands. One entry names Lugaid mac Lóegairi as his ally there, the other names Fergus Crook-mouth, father of Diarmait mac Cerbaill. In 485, the annals mention the battle of Grainert, perhaps near Castledermot, where Coirpre mac Néill, "or Mac Ercae… as other state", defeated the Leinster king Finnchad mac Garrchon. In 490 or 491, Óengus mac Nad Froích is said to have been killed at the battle of Cell Losnaid, and the second entry reports that "Mac Ercae was the victor". Muirchertach Mac Ercae is said to have won the battle of Inne Mór against the Leinstermen in 498. Many of the entries from the 480s and 490s appear to have been modified, to give Muirchertach the credit for victories won by Coirpre mac Néill and perhaps by Coirpre's son Eochu.

The obituary of Lugaid mac Lóegairi appears in 512, and in the following year the annalist reports the beginning of the reign of Muirchertach Mac Ercae. The next report is in 520, duplicated in 523, stating that Muirchertach was among the victors at the battle of Dethna. Another battle follow in 528, again repeated some years later, in 533, with more detail. Muirchertach's death is reported in 534, with obvious supernatural overtones: "The drowning of Muirchertach Mac Erca i.e. Muirchertach son of Muiredach son of Eógan son of Niall Naígiallach in a vat full of wine on the hilltop of Cleitech above Bóinn." Muirchertach was said to be followed as High King by Túathal Máelgarb.

== Issue ==
Báetán mac Muirchertaig (died 572), called also Baetán Bríge, was a son of Muirchertach mac Muiredaig, ruled in Ailech from 566 to 572 and was included in some lists as a High King of Ireland. Domnall Ilchelgach (Domnall of the Many Deceits) (died c. 566), called Domnall mac Muirchertaig, and Domnall mac Mac Maic Ercae, said to be a High King of Ireland, was probably also a son of Muirchertach mac Muiredaig. Muirchertach's descendants in time took the name Cenél maic Ercae and were the dominant branch of the Cenél nEógan by the middle of the 8th century.

The 12th-century Middle Irish tale Aided Muirchertaig Meic Erca is an account of Muirchertach's supernatural death. Here Muirchertach dies in the House of Clettach, drowned in a vat of wine, burned by fire, and crushed by a falling roof beam, near Brú na Bóinne, beguiled by the illusions of the otherworldly maiden Sín into believing that he is being attacked by Túathal Máelgarb. The manner of his demise is an example of the "Threefold death," a feature of Indo-European mythology and Celtic literature.
