= Baile Chuinn Chétchathaig =

Old Irish king-list

Baile Chuind Chétchathaig ([ˈbalʲe xun̠ʲd̠ʲ xʲeːd̪xaθəɣʲ], "The Vision of Conn of the Hundred Battles") is an Old Irish list of Kings of Tara or High Kings of Ireland which survives in two 16th-century manuscripts, 23 N 10 and Egerton 88. It is the earliest such king-list known, probably dating from around 700 AD. The later Baile In Scáil is closely related.

== Date ==
Baile Chuind Chétchathaig was first edited by Rudolf Thurneysen who dated it to about 700 AD and believed it to have been included in the lost Cín Dromma Snechtai manuscript. Thurneysen later revised this opinion based on the content of the poem, supposing that the poem's "Glúnshalach" represented 10th-century king Niall Glúndub. Later editors and writers have generally preferred Thurneysen's first estimate, taking the work to have been begun in the lifetime of Fínsnechta Fledach (died 695).

In recent studies Edel Bhreathnach has suggested that the current form of the poem may be somewhat later: while the kings who follow Fínsnechta were previously interpreted as imagined future kings, she suggests that these are in fact historical figures from the first quarter of the eighth century disguised by kennings. If this is correct, the poem as a whole dates from around 720 or was revised at about that time.
