= Dál Riata =

Gaelic kingdom in western Scotland and northeastern Ireland

- 498–850
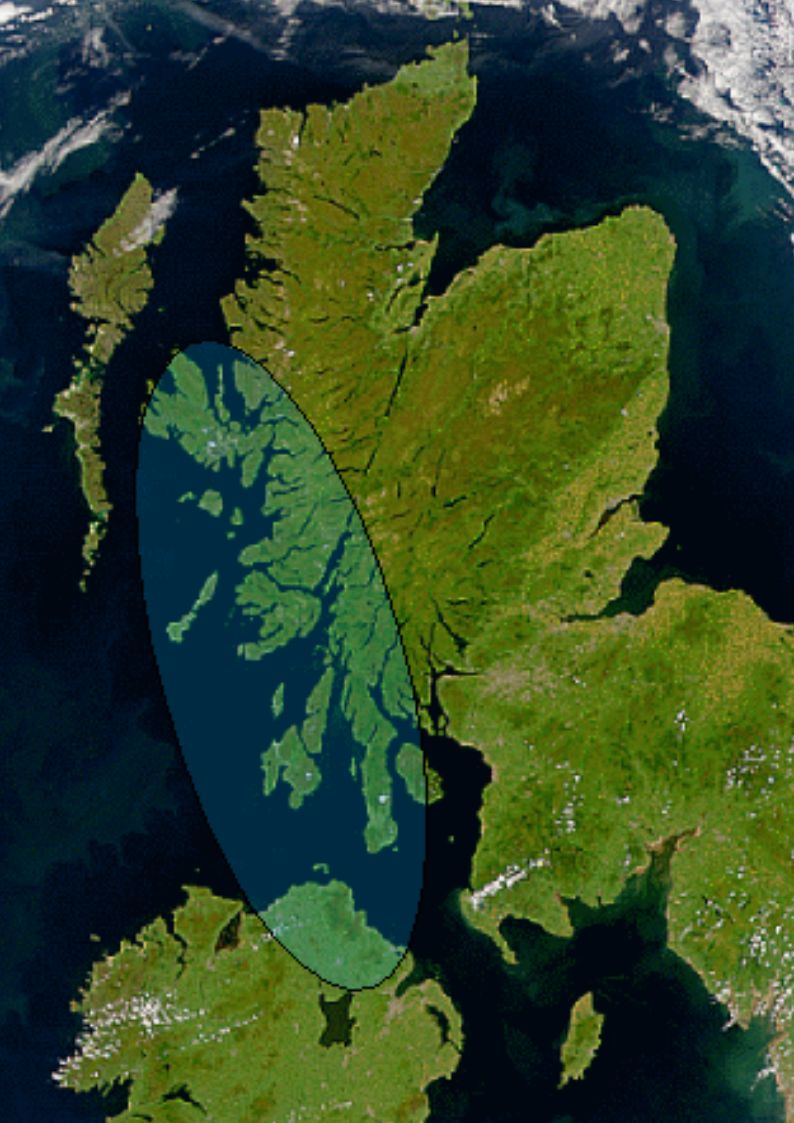
- Satellite image of Scotland and Northern Ireland showing the approximate greatest extent of Dál Riata (shaded)
- Capital: Dunadd
- Common languages: Old Gaelic
- Religion: Celtic Christianity; Ancient Celtic religion
- Demonym: Scoti
- Government: Monarchy
- King
  - 498–501: Fergus Mór (first)
  - 841–850: Cináed mac Ailpin (last)
- Historical era: Early Middle Ages
  - Established: 498
  - Disestablished: 850
Preceded by	Succeeded by
Ulaid	Kingdom of Scotland; Kingdom of the Isles
- Today part of: United Kingdom; Northern Ireland; Scotland

Dál Riata or Dál Riada (also Dalriada) (/dælˈriːədə/) was a Gaelic kingdom that encompassed the western seaboard of Scotland and northeastern Ireland, on each side of the North Channel. At its height in the 6th and 7th centuries, it covered what is now Argyll ("Coast of the Gaels") in Scotland and part of County Antrim in Northern Ireland. After a period of expansion, Dál Riata eventually became associated with the Gaelic Kingdom of Alba.

In Argyll, it consisted of four main kindreds or tribes, each with their own chief: the Cenél nGabráin (based in Kintyre), the Cenél nÓengusa (based on Islay), the Cenél Loairn (who gave their name to the district of Lorn) and the Cenél Comgaill (who gave their name to Cowal). The hillfort of Dunadd is believed to have been its capital. Other royal forts included Dunollie, Dunaverty and Dunseverick. Within Dál Riata was the important monastery of Iona, which played a key role in the spread of Celtic Christianity throughout northern Britain, and in the development of insular art. Iona was a centre of learning and produced many important manuscripts. Dál Riata had a strong seafaring culture and a large naval fleet.

Dál Riata is said to have been founded by the legendary king Fergus Mór (Fergus the Great) in the 5th century. The kingdom reached its height under Áedán mac Gabráin (r. 574–608). During his reign Dál Riata's power and influence grew; it carried out naval expeditions to Orkney and the Isle of Man, and assaults on the Brittonic kingdom of Strathclyde and Anglian kingdom of Bernicia. However, King Æthelfrith of Bernicia checked its growth at the Battle of Degsastan in 603. Serious defeats in Ireland and Scotland during the reign of Domnall Brecc (died 642) ended Dál Riata's "golden age", and the kingdom became a client of Northumbria for a time. In the 730s the Pictish king Óengus I led campaigns against Dál Riata and brought it under Pictish overlordship by 741. There is disagreement over the fate of the kingdom from the late 8th century onwards. Some scholars have seen no revival of Dál Riatan power after the long period of foreign domination (c. 637 to c. 750–760), while others have seen a revival under Áed Find (736–778). Some even claim that the Dál Riata usurped the kingship of Fortriu. From 795 onward there were sporadic Viking raids in Dál Riata. In the following century, there may have been a merger of the Dál Riatan and Pictish crowns. Some sources say Cináed mac Ailpín (Kenneth MacAlpin) was king of Dál Riata before becoming king of the Picts in 843, following a disastrous defeat of the Picts by Vikings. The kingdom's independence ended sometime after, as it merged with Pictland to form the Kingdom of Alba.

Latin sources often referred to the inhabitants of Dál Riata as Scots (Scoti), a name originally used by Roman and Greek writers for the Irish Gaels who raided and colonised Roman Britain. Later, it came to refer to Gaels, whether from Ireland or elsewhere. They are referred to herein as Gaels or as Dál Riatans.

== Name ==
The name Dál Riata comes from Old Irish and means "the portion of Riata". Dál is part of the names of other Irish territories, such as Dál Fiatach and Dál gCais. Riata is the genitive of a tribal name or deity name. Bede wrote that the kingdom was named after its founder, a man called Reuda. Some Old Gaelic texts say that the kingdom was named after the Corcu Réti, descendants of Domangart Réti. Another legend says that it was named after one Cairbre Riata.

The Dalradian geological series, a term coined by Archibald Geikie in 1891, was named after Dál Riata because its outcrop has a similar geographical reach to that of the former kingdom.

== People, land and sea ==
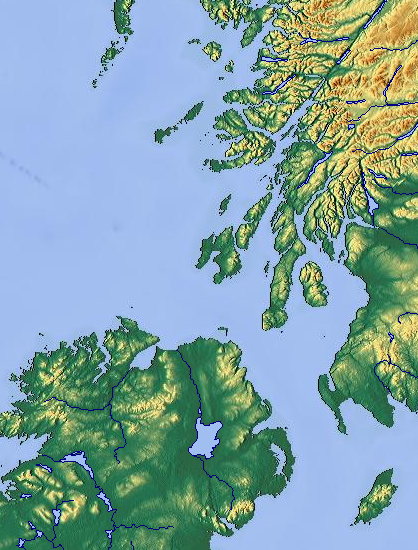
Ulster and the Hebrides

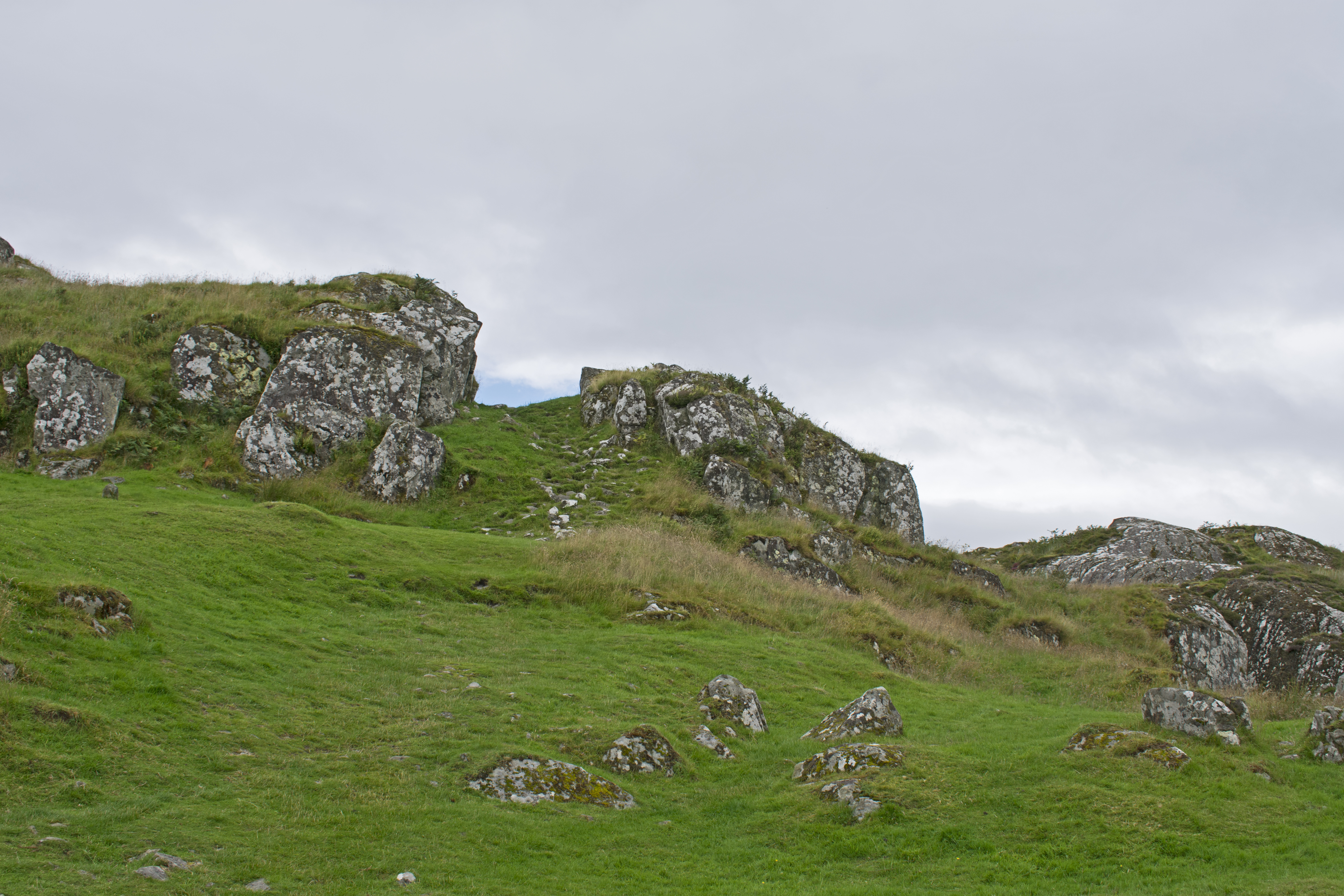
Dunadd Hillfort

Dál Riata spanned the North Channel and included parts of western Scotland and north-eastern Ireland. In Scotland, it corresponded roughly to Argyll (from Airer Goídel, "coast of the Gaels") and later grew to include Skye. In Ireland, it took in the north-east of County Antrim, roughly corresponding to the baronies of Cary and Glenarm.

The modern human landscape of Dál Riata differs a great deal from that of the first millennium. Most people today live in settlements far larger than anything known in early times, while some areas, such as Kilmartin, and many of the islands, such as Islay and Tiree, may well have had as many inhabitants as they do today. Many of the small settlements have now disappeared so that the countryside is far emptier than was formerly the case, and many areas that were formerly farmed are now abandoned. Even the physical landscape is not entirely as it was: sea levels have changed, and the combination of erosion and silting will have considerably altered the shape of the coast in some places, while the natural accumulation of peat and human-made changes from peat-cutting have altered inland landscapes.

As was normal at the time, subsistence farming was the occupation of most people. Oats and barley were the main cereal crops. Pastoralism was especially important, and transhumance (the seasonal movement of people with their livestock between fixed summer and winter pastures) was the practice in many places. Some areas, most notably Islay, were especially fertile, and good grazing would have been available all year round, just as it was in Ireland. Tiree was famed in later times for its oats and barley, while smaller, uninhabited islands were used to keep sheep. The area, until lately, was notable for its inshore fisheries, and for plentiful shellfish, therefore seafood is likely to have been an important part of the diet.

The Senchus fer n-Alban lists three main kin groups in Dál Riata in Scotland, with a fourth being added later:

- The Cenél nGabráin (kindred of Gabrán) in Kintyre, who claimed descent from Gabrán mac Domangairt
- The Cenél nÓengusa (kindred of Óengus) in Islay and Jura, who claimed descent from Óengus Mór mac Eirc
- The Cenél Loairn (kindred of Loarn) in Lorne, perhaps also Mull and Ardnamurchan, who claimed descent from Loarn mac Eirc
- The Cenél Comgaill (kindred of Comgall) in Cowal and Bute, a later addition, who claimed descent from Comgall mac Domangairt. They may have expanded eastwards into Strathearn during the 8th century.

The Senchus does not list any kindreds in Ireland, but does list an apparently very minor kindred called Cenél Chonchride in Islay descended from another son of Erc, Fergus Becc. Another kindred, Cenél Báetáin of Morvern (later Clan MacInnes), branched off from Cenél Loairn about the same time that Cenél Comgaill separated from its parent kindred. The Morvern district was formerly known as Kinelvadon, after the Cenél Báetáin. The Cenél Loairn may have been the largest of the "three kindreds", as the Senchus reports it being divided further into Cenél Shalaig, Cenél Cathbath, Cenél nEchdach, Cenél Murerdaig. Among the Cenél Loairn it also lists the Airgíalla, although whether this should be understood as being Irish settlers or simply another tribe to whom the label was applied is unclear. Bannerman proposes a tie to the Uí Macc Uais. The meaning of Airgíalla 'hostage givers' adds to the uncertainty, although it must be observed that only one grouping in Ireland was apparently given this name and it is therefore very rare, perhaps supporting the Ui Macc Uais hypothesis. There is no reason to suppose that this is a complete or accurate list.

Four sites in Dál Riata may have had royal associations: Dunadd, Dunollie, Dunaverty and Tarbert. Among them, Dunadd appears to have been the most important. It has been partly excavated, and weapons, quern-stones and many moulds for the manufacture of jewellery were found in addition to fortifications. Other high-status materials included glassware and wine amphorae from Gaul, and in larger quantities than found elsewhere in Britain and Ireland. Lesser centres included Dun Ollaigh, seat of the Cenél Loairn kings, and Dunaverty, at the southern end of Kintyre, in the lands of the Cenél nGabráin. The main royal centre in Ireland appears to have been at Dunseverick (Dún Sebuirge).

Dál Riata had a strong seafaring culture, which was tribal and piratic. It was an archipelago with many islands and peninsulas. This, and the difficulty of overland travel, meant that travel by sea was the easiest means of moving any distance. As well as long-distance trade, local trade must also have been significant. Currachs were probably the most common seagoing craft, and on inland waters dugouts and coracles were used. Large timber ships, called "long ships", perhaps similar to the Viking ships of the same name, are attested to in a variety of sources. Dál Riata had a large war fleet manned by skilled sailors, capable of undertaking far-reaching expeditions. It had an organised system for manning the fleet. Houses were grouped into twenties for the purpose of naval recruitment, with each group having to provide a quota of 28 oarsmen.

== Religion and art ==
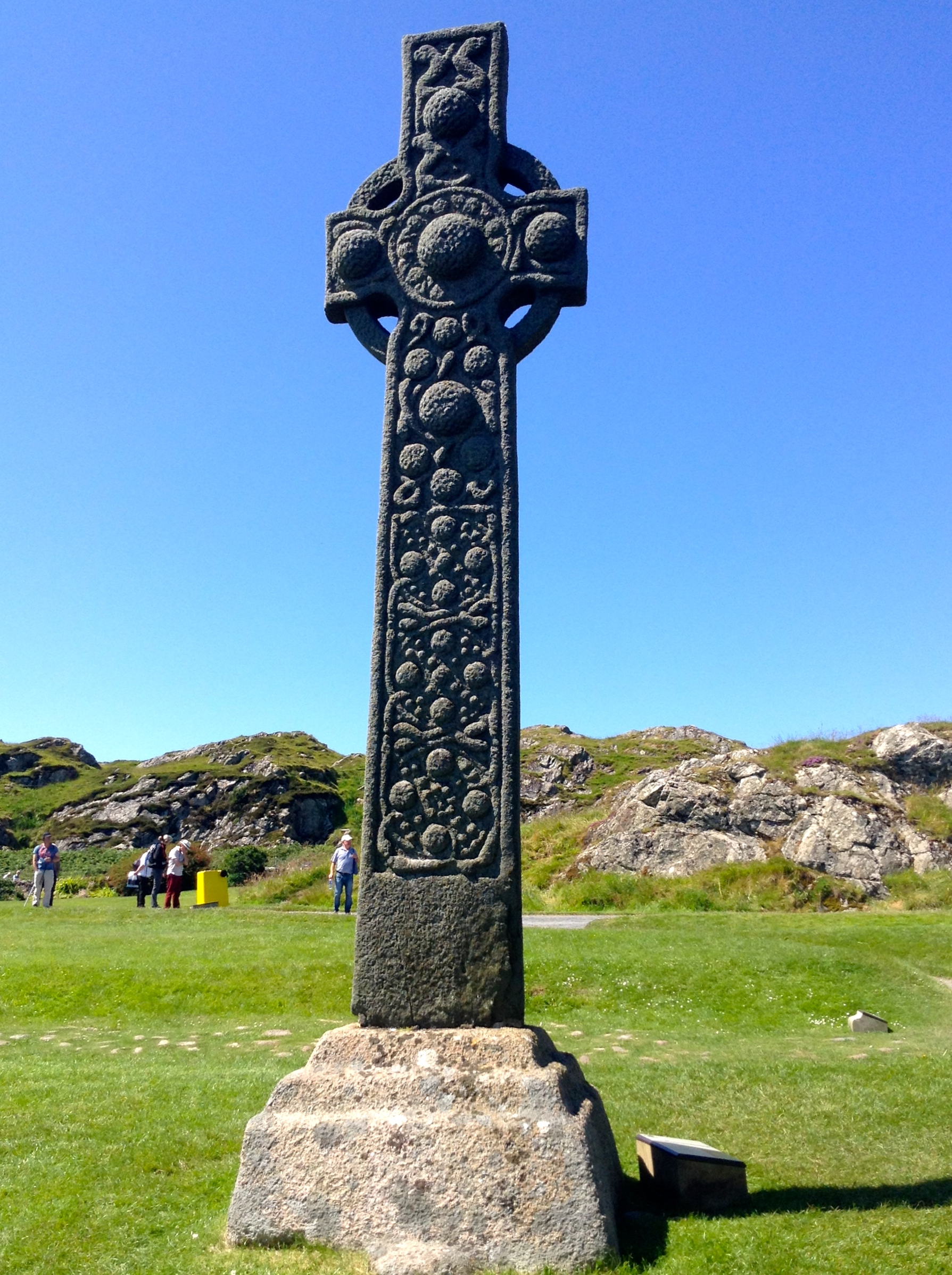
9th-century St Martin's Cross on Iona

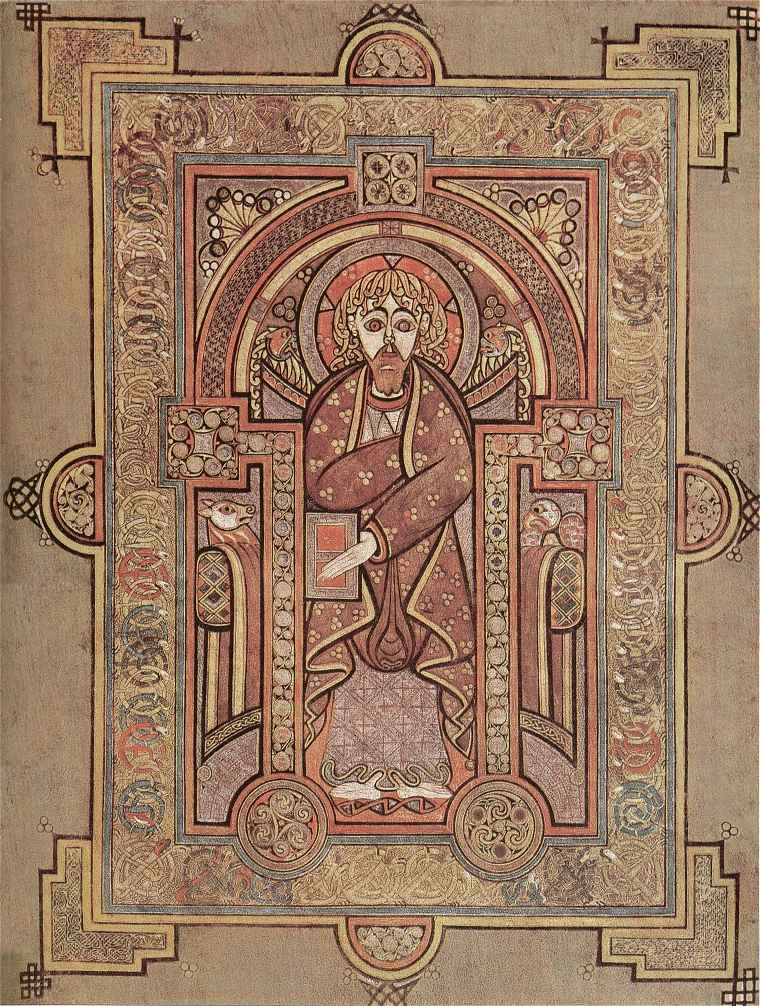
Saint Matthew, folio 28v in the Book of Kells

No written accounts exist for pre-Christian Dál Riata, and the earliest-known records come from the chroniclers of Iona and Irish monasteries. During the time of Saint Patrick, Dál Riatan kings thought they were descended from Celtic gods, and pagans in the region viewed certain springs and "spirit-inhabited groves of trees" as sacred groves.

Adomnán's Life of St Columba implies a Christian Dál Riata. Whether this is true cannot be known. The figure of Columba looms large in any history of Christianity in Dál Riata. Adomnán's Life, although useful as a record, was not intended to serve as history, but rather as hagiography. Because the writing of the lives of the saints in Adomnán's day had not reached the stylised formulas of the High Middle Ages, the Life contains a great deal of historically valuable information. It is also a vital linguistic source indicating the distribution of Gaelic and P-Celtic placenames in northern Scotland by the end of the 7th century. It famously notes Columba's need for a translator when conversing with an individual on Skye. This evidence of a non-Gaelic language is supported by a sprinkling of P-Celtic placenames on the remote mainland opposite the island.

Columba's founding Iona within the bounds of Dál Riata ensured that the kingdom would be of great importance in the spread of Christianity in northern Britain, not only to Pictland, but also to Northumbria, via Lindisfarne, to Mercia, and beyond. Although the monastery of Iona belonged to the Cenél Conaill of the Northern Uí Néill, and not to Dál Riata, it had close ties to the Cenél nGabráin, ties which may make the annals less than entirely impartial.

If Iona was the greatest religious centre in Dál Riata, it was far from unique. Lismore, in the territory of the Cenél Loairn, was sufficiently important for the death of its abbots to be recorded with some frequency. Applecross, probably in Pictish territory for most of the period, and Kingarth on Bute are also known to have been monastic sites, and many smaller sites, such as on Eigg and Tiree, are known from the annals. In Ireland, Armoy was the main ecclesiastical centre in early times, associated with Saint Patrick and with Saint Olcán, said to have been the first bishop at Armoy. An important early centre, Armoy later declined, overshadowed by the monasteries at Movilla (Newtownards) and Bangor.

As well as their primary spiritual importance, the political significance of religious centres cannot be dismissed. The prestige of being associated with the saintly founder was of no small importance. Monasteries represented a source of wealth as well as prestige. Additionally, the learning and literacy found in monasteries served as useful tools for ambitious kings.

The illuminated manuscript Book of Kells was probably at least begun at Iona, although not by Columba as legend has it, as it dates from about 800. (It may have been commissioned to mark the bicentennial of Columba's death in 597). Whether it was or not, Iona was certainly important in the formation of Insular art, which combined Mediterranean, Anglo-Saxon, Celtic and Pictish elements into a style of which the book of Kells is a late example.

For other arts, a number of sculptures remain to give an impression of Dál Riatan work. The St. Martin's Cross on Iona is the well-preserved high cross, probably inspired by Northumbrian free-standing crosses, such as the Ruthwell Cross, although a similar cross exists in Ireland (Ahenny, County Tipperary). The Kildalton Cross on Islay is similar. A sculpted slab at Ardchattan appears to show strong Pictish influences, while the Dupplin Cross, it has been argued, shows that influences also moved in the opposite direction. Fine Hiberno-Saxon metalwork such as penannular brooches is believed to have been created at Dunadd.

In addition to the monastic sites, a considerable number of churches are attested, not only from archaeological evidence, but also from the evidence of place names. The element "kil", from Gaelic cill, can be shown in many cases to be associated with early churches, such as at Kilmartin by Dunadd.

== History ==
=== Origins ===
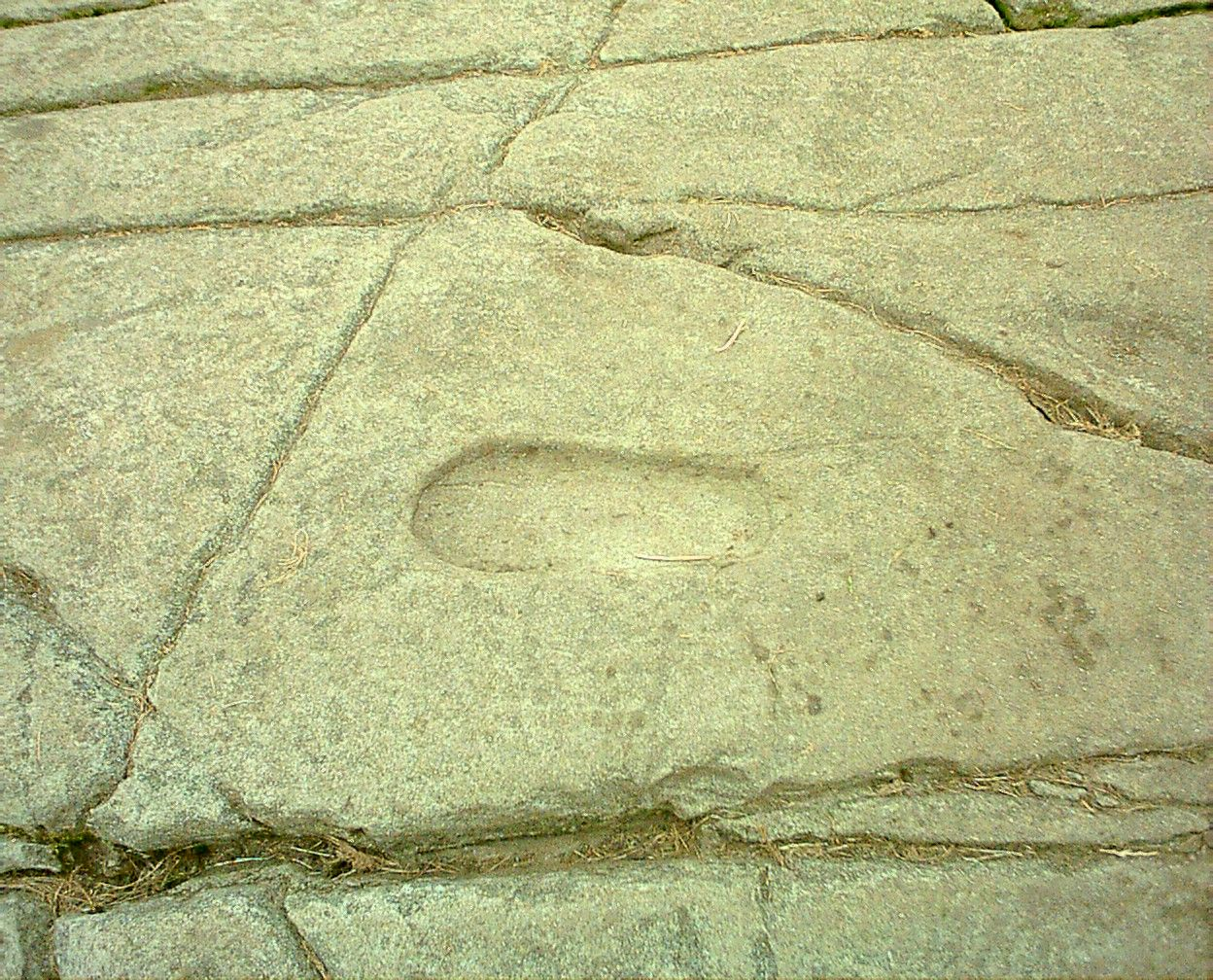
Footprint (replica) used in king-making ceremonies, Dunadd

The 11th-century Duan Albanach (Song of the Scots) tells that the three sons of Erc—Fergus Mór, Loarn and Óengus—conquered Alba (Scotland) in around 500. The 8th-century writer Bede offers another, and probably older, account wherein Dál Riata was conquered by Irish Gaels led by a certain Reuda. Old Irish dál means 'portion' or 'share', and is usually followed by the name of an eponymous founder. Bede's tale may come from the same root as the Irish tales of Cairpre Riata and his brothers, the Síl Conairi (sons/descendants of Conaire Cóem and Conaire Mór). The story of Dál Riata moves from foundation myth to something nearer to history with the reports of the death of Comgall mac Domangairt around 540 and of his brother Gabrán around 560.

The version of history in the Duan Albanach was long accepted, although it is preceded by the fictional tale of Albanus and Brutus conquering Britain. Traditionally, the presence of Gaelic in Scotland has been seen as the result of either a migration from Ireland, or a takeover by Irish Gaelic elites. However, in his academic paper Were the Scots Irish?, archaeologist Dr Ewan Campbell says that there is no archaeological or placename evidence of a migration or takeover. This lack of archaeological evidence was previously noted by Professor Leslie Alcock. Campbell suggests that Argyll and Antrim formed a "maritime province", united by the sea and isolated from the rest of Scotland by the mountains of the Highlands, historically called the Druim Alban. This hypothetical separation allowed a shared language to be maintained through the centuries; Argyll remained Gaelic-speaking while the rest of Scotland spoke either Pictish or another Brittonic language. Campbell suggests that the medieval accounts were a kind of dynastic propaganda, constructed to bolster a dynasty's claim to the throne and to bolster Dál Riata claims to territory in Antrim. Although this view of the medieval accounts is shared by other historians, his theory has been challenged.

Irish scholar Eoin MacNeill postulated that Scottish Dál Riata came about in two stages. He conjectured that Irish settlements were founded in Argyll at the time of Irish raids on Britain, during the end of Roman rule. Later, as these settlements became economically and politically more significant than the home territory, its rulers moved from Ireland to Argyll.

The time in which Dál Riata arose was one of great instability in Ulster, following the Ulaid's loss of territory (including the ancient centre of Emain Macha) to the Airgíalla and the Uí Néill. "The thriving of Dalriada", pp. 47–50, notes a later conquest of Irish Dál Riata from Scotland, in the period after the fall of Emain Macha.

Linguistic and genealogical evidence associates ancestors of the Dál Riata with the prehistoric Iverni and Darini, suggesting kinship with the Ulaid and a number of shadowy kingdoms in distant Munster. The Robogdii have also been suggested as ancestral. Ultimately, the Dál Riata, according to the earliest genealogies, are descendants of Deda mac Sin, a prehistoric king or deity of the Érainn.

=== Druim Cett to Mag Rath ===
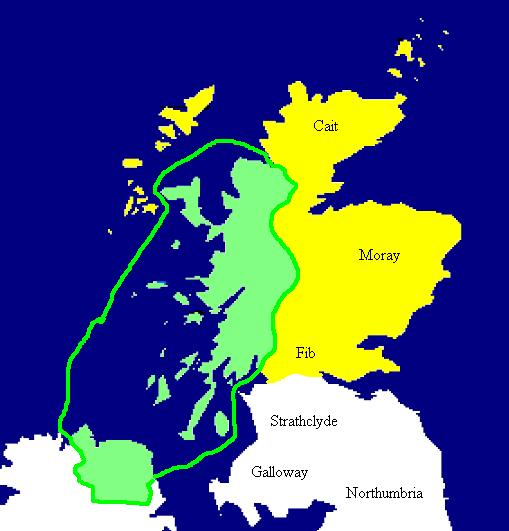
Map of Dál Riata at its height, c. 580–600. Pictish regions are marked in yellow.

By the mid-6th century, the Dál Riata in Scotland came under serious threat from Bridei I, king of the Picts, whilst the Irish portion faced hostility from the Dál nAraidi of Ulaid, resulting in their seeking the aid of the Irish Northern Uí Néill. Dál Riata reached its greatest extent in the reign of Áedán mac Gabráin, who was said to have been consecrated by Columba, to whom Áedán granted the island of Iona off the coast of Scotland. Columba, who was also a Cenél Conaill prince, negotiated an alliance between Dál Riata and the Cenél Conaill, who were the ruling dynasty of the Northern Uí Néill, in 575 at the Convention of Druim Cett near Limavady. In attendance were Columba, Áedán mac Gabráin, and Áed mac Ainmuirech, king of the Northern Uí Néill and High King of Ireland.

What was actually discussed at Druim Cett is a matter of debate, with various suggestions that it was: to determine the constitutional status of both parts of Dál Riata; to determine the status of Irish Dál Riata only with it having its own king; that Dál Riata was to become independent of the High King of Ireland; that the Irish part of Dál Riata would pay tribute to the High King and support him with land forces, and that the Scottish part would be independent but support the High King with its fleet when needed; the removal of Dál Riata from Ulaid's overlordship, allowing it to concentrate on extending its Scottish domain. What is certain is that both parties had the Dál nAraidi as a common foe.

This pact between the Dál Riata and Cenél Conaill was successful, first in defeating Báetan mac Cairill, king of the Dál nAraidi, then in allowing Áedán to campaign widely against his neighbours, as far afield as Orkney and lands of the Maeatae, on the River Forth. Áedán appears to have been very successful in extending his power, until he faced the Bernician king Æthelfrith at Degsastan c. 603. Æthelfrith's brother was among the dead, but Áedán was defeated, and the Bernician kings continued their advances in southern Scotland. Áedán died c. 608 aged about 70. Dál Riata did expand to include Skye, possibly conquered by Áedán's son Gartnait.

It has been suggested that Fiachnae mac Báetáin (died 626), Dál nAraidi over-king of Ulaid, was overlord of both parts of Dál Riata. Fiachnae campaigned against the Northumbrians, and besieged Bamburgh, and the Dál Riatans are thought to have fought in this campaign.

In 629, the Dál Riata suffered significant losses at the battle of Fid Euin where the Dál nAraidi, led by Congal Cáech mac Scandláin, killed the Dál Riata king as well as three grandsons of Áedán mac Gabráin. It is suggested to have been an achievement that Dál Riata itself survived this battle. That same year the Cenél Conaill defeated Congal Cáech at the battle of Dún Ceithirn.

Dál Riata remained allied with the Northern Uí Néill until the reign of Domnall Brecc, who was persuaded by the king of Dál nAraidi, Congal Cáech, to renounce this alliance. In an attempt to have himself installed as High King of Ireland, Congal made alliances with Dál Riata and Strathclyde, which resulted in the disastrous Battle of Magh Rath in 637, which saw Congal slain by High King Domnall mac Áedo of the Northern Uí Néill and resulted in Irish Dál Riata losing possession of its Scottish lands. A battle had also taken place at sea at Sailtír, off Kintyre, in 637. This defeat was then attributed as divine retribution for Domnall Brecc turning his back on his prior alliance. Domnall Brecc's policy appears to have died with him in 642, at his final, and fatal, defeat by Eugein map Beli of Strathclyde at Strathcarron, for as late as the 730s, armies and fleets from Dál Riata fought alongside the Uí Néill.

This defeat shattered the power of Dál Riata as well as that of Dál nAraidi, allowing the Northern Uí Néill to become the dominant force in the north of Ireland. By the 10th century, the Irish lands of Dál Riata were under the control of the Uí Tuirtri, and their clients, the Fir Lí.

=== Mag Rath to the Pictish conquest ===
It has been proposed that some of the more obscure kings of Dál Riata mentioned in the Annals of Ulster, such as Fiannamail ua Dúnchado and Donncoirce, may have been kings of Irish Dál Riata.

The after-effect of the Battle of Moira (Mag Rath) in regards to Scottish Dál Riata appears to have resulted in its becoming tributary to Northumbrian kings, which lasted until the Pictish king Bruide mac Bili defeated Ecgfrith of Northumbria at Dun Nechtain in 685. It is not certain that this subjection ended in 685, although this is usually assumed to be the case. However, it appears that Eadberht Eating made some effort to stop the Picts under Óengus mac Fergusa crushing Dál Riata in 740. Whether this means that the tributary relationship had not ended in 685, or if Eadberht sought only to prevent the growth of Pictish power, is unclear.

Since it has been thought that Dál Riata swallowed Pictland to create the Kingdom of Alba, the later history of Dál Riata has tended to be seen as a prelude to future triumphs. The annals make it clear that the Cenél Gabraín lost any earlier monopoly of royal power in the late 7th century and in the 8th, when Cenél Loairn kings such as Ferchar Fota, his son Selbach, and grandsons Dúngal and Muiredach are found contesting for the kingship of Dál Riata. The long period of instability in Dál Riata was only ended by the conquest of the kingdom by Óengus mac Fergusa, king of the Picts, in the 730s. After the third campaign by Óengus in 741, Dál Riata then disappears from the Irish records for a generation.

=== The last century ===
Áed Find may appear in 768, fighting against the Pictish king of Fortriu. At his death in 778, Áed Find is called "king of Dál Riata", as is his brother Fergus mac Echdach in 781. The Annals of Ulster say that a certain Donncoirche, "king of Dál Riata" died in 792, and there the record ends. Any number of theories have been advanced to fill the missing generations, none of which are founded on any very solid evidence. A number of kings are named in the Duan Albanach, and in royal genealogies, but these are rather less reliable than we might wish. The obvious conclusion is that whoever ruled the petty kingdom of Dál Riata after its defeat and conquest in the 730s, only Áed Find and his brother Fergus drew the least attention of the chroniclers in Iona and Ireland. This argues very strongly for Alex Woolf's conclusion that Óengus mac Fergusa "effectively destroyed the kingdom".

It is unlikely that Dál Riata was ruled directly by Pictish kings, but it is argued that Domnall, son of Caustantín mac Fergusa, was king of Dál Riata from 811 to 835. He was apparently followed by the last named king of Dál Riata Áed mac Boanta, who was killed in the great Pictish defeat of 839 at the hands of the Vikings.

In the 9th century, the Picts were becoming Gaelicised, and it is suggested that there was a merger of the Dál Riatan and Pictish kingships. Traditionally, this is attributed to Cináed mac Ailpín (Kenneth MacAlpin), who became king of the Picts in about 843. Some sources say that Cináed was king of Dál Riata for two years before this. Under the House of Alpin, Dál Riata and Pictland merged to form the Kingdom of Alba or Scotland.

=== From Dál Riata to the Innse Gall ===
If the Vikings had a great impact on Pictland and in Ireland, in Dál Riata, as in Northumbria, they appear to have entirely replaced the existing kingdom with a new entity. In the case of Dál Riata, this was to be known as the kingdom of the Sudreys, traditionally founded by Ketill Flatnose (Caitill Find in Gaelic) in the middle of the 9th century. The Frankish Annales Bertiniani may record the conquest of the Inner Hebrides, the seaward part of Dál Riata, by Vikings in 847.

Alex Woolf has suggested that there occurred a formal division of Dál Riata between the Norse–Gaelic Uí Ímair and the natives, like those divisions that took place elsewhere in Ireland and Britain, with the Norse controlling most of the islands, and the Gaels controlling the Scottish coast and the more southerly islands. In turn, Woolf suggests that this gave rise to the terms Airer Gaedel and Innse Gall, respectively, "the coast of the Gaels" and the "Islands of the foreigners".

=== Under the House of Alpin ===
Woolf has further demonstrated that, by the time of Malcolm II, the leading cenela of Dál Riata had moved from the south-west of the region (north of the Firths) to the north, east and north-east, with Cenel Loairn moving up the Great Glen to occupy Moray, the former and sometimes still Fortriu, one branch of Cenel nGabhrain occupying the district known as Gowrie and another the district of Fife, Cenel nOengusa giving its name to Circinn as Angus, Cenel Comgaill occupying Strathearn, and another lesser-known kindred, Cenel Conaing, probably moving to Mar.

== See also ==
- Dáirine
- Duan Albanach
- History of Ireland (400–795)
- History of Ireland (795–1169)
- Irish Scottish people
- Kingdom of Dyfed
- List of kings of Dál Riata
- Origins of the Kingdom of Alba
- Petrosomatoglyph
- Prehistoric Scotland
- Scotland in the Early Middle Ages
- Scotland in the High Middle Ages
- Senchus fer n-Alban
