= Ninnidh =

6th-century Irish monastic founder, bishop and saint

Saint Ninnidh Apostle of Ireland
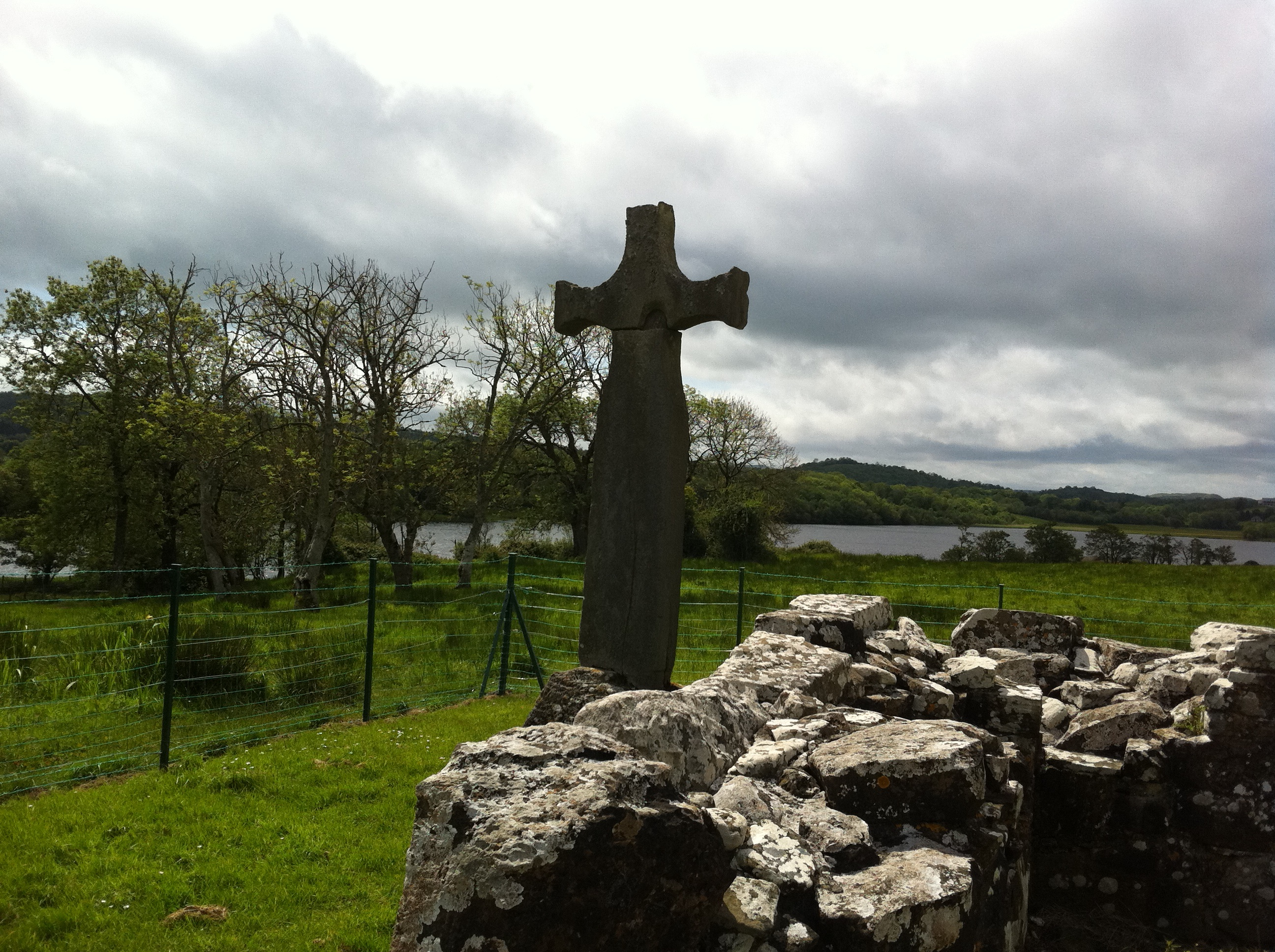
- Inismacsaint, Lower Lough Erne, Fermanagh
- Born: Cenél Conaill, Gaelic Ireland (today County Donegal, Ireland)
- Residence: Inis-muighesamb, Lough Erne, Ulster
- Died: 6th century Inis-muighesamb, Cenél Rochada, Gaelic Ireland
- Venerated in: Eastern Orthodox Church; Roman Catholic Church
- Canonized: pre-congregation
- Feast: 18 January

Ninnidh (pronounced as "Ninny") (alias Ninnidh the Pious, Irish: Ninnidh leth derc, meaning one-eyed Ninnidh, Nennius, Nennidhius, Ninnaid) was a 6th-century Irish Christian saint. Ninnidh is regarded as one of the Twelve Apostles of Ireland. He is associated with the shores of Lough Erne and particularly the island of Inishmacsaint and the parish of Knockninny, County Fermanagh, Northern Ireland (derived from the Irish: Cnoc Ninnidh, meaning the Hill of Ninnidh). His feast day is 18 January.

Ninnidh of Inismacsaint is often confused with Ninnidh of the Pure Hand who attended Brigid of Kildare on her deathbed.

== Life ==
Ninnidh was born in County Donegal, a grandson of Laoghaire, the High King of Ireland. He was educated under Finian at Clonard, where his fellow students included Ciarán of Clonmacnoise, Molaise of Devenish and Aidan of Ferns. Ninnidh preached along the south shore of Lough Erne making the island of Inishmacsaint (Island of the Sorrel Plain) his headquarters around 532.

Ninnidh likely journeyed up and down the Southern portion of Lower Lough Erne in a hollowed-out boat, coming ashore and making his way inland to meet people and spread the gospel. After Saint Patrick's time, the Celtic Church was divided into many territories and ruled by Abbots of Monasteries, only some of whom were Bishops. Ninnidh built a monastery on Inishmacsaint Isle (near Devenish) circa 530A.D. and using the waterways of the time cared for the people from the Erne as far as the sea, sending his priests and monks to the local Churches. In 530 AD Ninnidh held a 40-day fast on Knockninny Hill, during the period of Lent.

== Other accounts ==
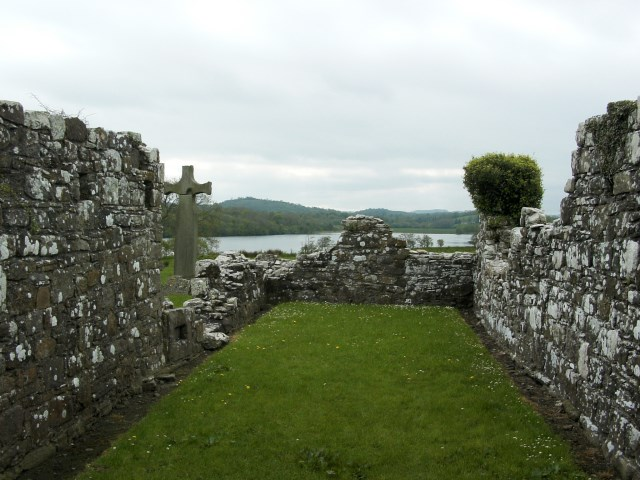
Ruins of Inishmacsaints

The monks of Ramsgate in their Book of Saints say only,

NENNIUS (St.) Abbot. (Jan 17)

(6th century) An Irish Saint, disciple of St. Finnian of Clonard, reckoned as one of the "Twelve Apostles of Ireland." The particulars of his life are lost.

The hagiographer Alban Butler wrote in the Lives of the Irish Saints (1823),

January 17.

St. Nennius, or Nennidhius, Ab.

DESPISING the vanities of the world, though of the race of the monarchs of Ireland, from his youth made the science of the cross of Christ his chief science, and the sole object of his ambition; and to engrave in his heart the lessons which our divine Redeemer taught by that adorable mystery, was the centre of all his desires. Having past [sic] many years, first in the school of St. Fiachus, archbishop of Leinster, and afterwards in the celebrated monastery of Clonard, in the province of Meath, under its holy founder St. Finian, he retired into the isle of Inis-muighesamb, in the lake of Erne, in the province of Ulster. Here in process of time he became the director of many souls in the paths of Christian perfection, founded a great monastery, and on account of his eminent sanctity, and the number of illustrious disciples whom he left behind him, is called one of the twelve apostles of Ireland. He flourished in the sixth century, and has been honoured in Ireland among the saints. F. Colgan was not able to meet with any acts of his life, though he is mentioned in the lives of several other Irish saints. A church in the isle of the lake, formed by the river Erne, is dedicated to God in his honour.

== Legacy ==
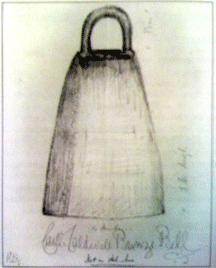
St. Ninnidh's Bell from a sketch in 1877, when the bell's last whereabouts were known.

St. Ninnidh's feast day is 18 January. St. Ninnidh's well is situated at Knockninny Quay on the shores of Upper Lough Erne and is reputed to have curative properties for eye ailments. In William Henry's Upper Lough Erne in 1739 the well was described as a chief curiosity, "being a plentiful foundation of pure water, having a clearance and coolness scarce to be met with. It was at that time a popular spot for boatspeople to retire to for their entertainments for which and around it are arranged benches of sod and over it a shade of aquatic trees".

St. Ninnidh's bell, traditionally presented to Ninnidh by Senach of Derrybrusk, was kept in Knockninny parish in the 17th century. It was at Castle Caldwell (now incorporated into the Enniskillen Castle Museum in County Fermanagh until 1877 when it was sold at auction to Robert Day of Cork (who sketched the drawing to right). When Day's collection was sold in 1913, this bell was not part of the sale. Although for some time it was identified with a bell in the National Museum of Edinburgh (probably St. Ninian's Bell, formerly from the collection of John Bell), the location of St. Ninnidh's Bell is unknown.

Note that while this Ninnidh is traditionally considered a saint, he is not listed in the latest official, complete martyrology of the Catholic Church, the 2004 Martyrologium Romanum in Latin.

== See also ==
- Knockninny
