= Cainnech of Aghaboe =

Irish abbot and saint (c. 515 – 600)

Saint Cainnech of Aghaboe
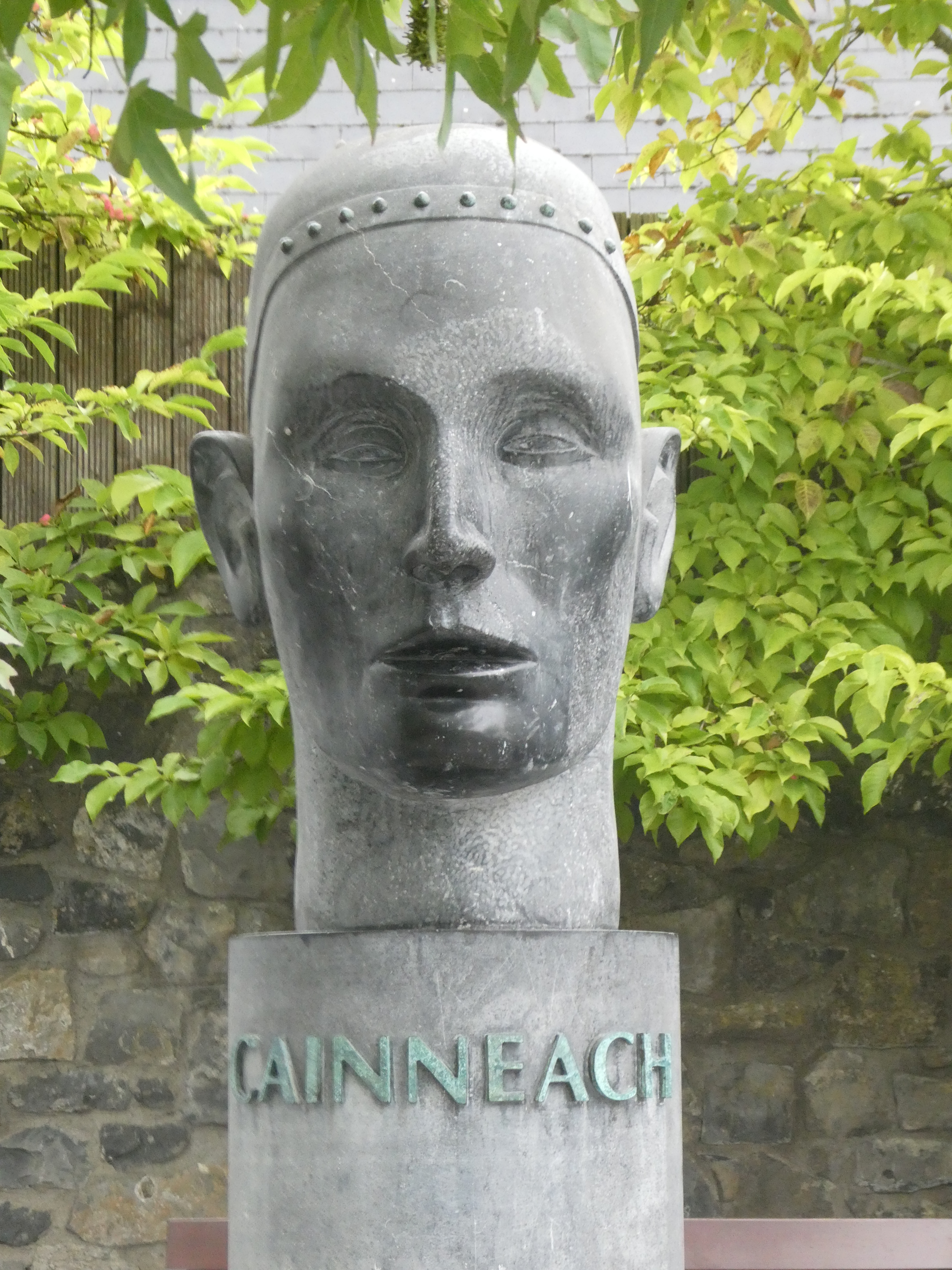
- Bust of Saint Cainnech in Kilkenny

Confessor of the Faith
- Born: c. 515 AD; Glengiven, Cenél nEógain, Gaelic Ireland
- Died: 600 (aged 84–85); Aghaboe, Laois, Gaelic Ireland
- Venerated in: Roman Catholic Church; Eastern Orthodox Church; Anglican Communion
- Canonized: pre-congregation
- Feast: 11 October; 1 or 14 August
- Patronage: the shipwrecked

Cainnech of Aghaboe (515/16–600), also known as Saint Canice in Ireland, Saint Kenneth in Scotland, Saint Kenny and in Latin Sanctus Canicus, was an Irish abbot, monastic founder, priest and missionary during the early medieval period. Cainnech is one of the Twelve Apostles of Ireland and preached Christianity across Ireland and to the Picts in Scotland. He wrote a commentary on the Gospels, which for centuries was known as the Glas-Choinnigh or Kenneth's Lock or the Chain of Cainnech.

Most of what is written about Cainnech's life is based on tradition, however he was considered a man of virtue, great eloquence and learning. His feast day is commemorated on 11 October in the Roman Catholic Church and the Eastern Orthodox Church according to their respective calendars (Gregorian or Church Julian) with additional feast days on 1 or 14 August in the Eastern Orthodox Church.

== Introduction ==
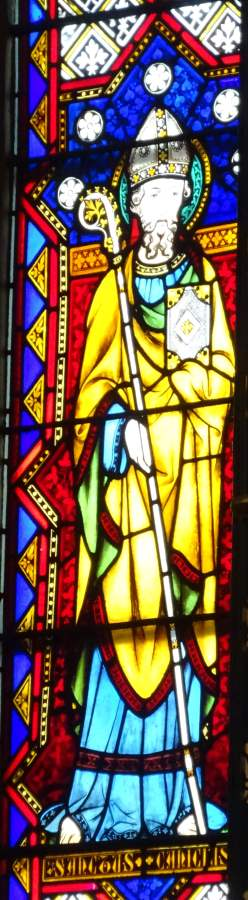
Depicted in stained glass, St Mary's Cathedral, Kilkenny

A lot of what is known of Cainnech comes from legend. However, he is documented by Adomnán (also known as Eunan), the ninth abbot of Iona who died in 704. Adomnán was a hagiographer and his greatest work Vita Columbae or Life of St. Columba contains references to Cainnech.

== Cainnech's background ==
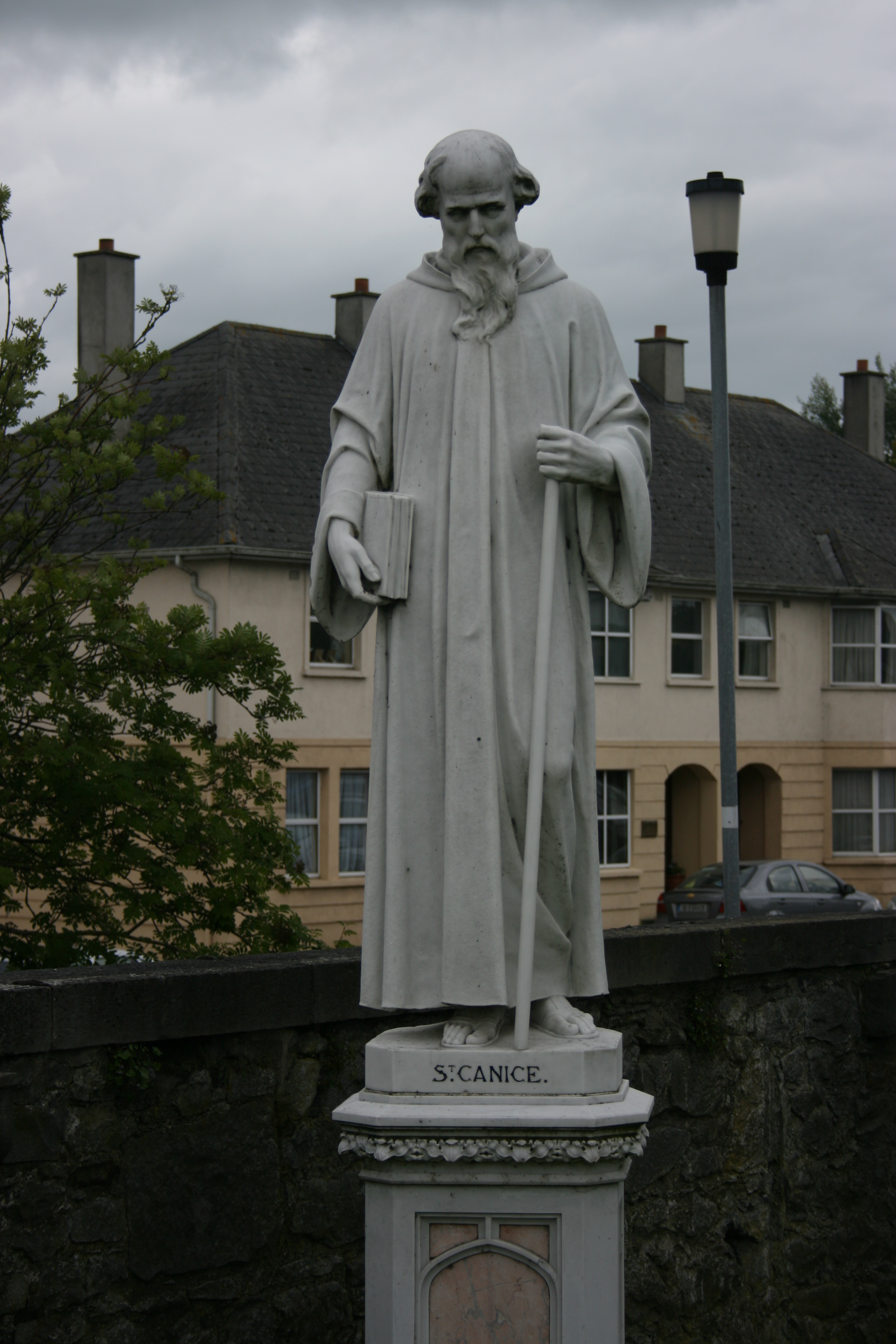
Statue at St. Canice's Catholic Church, Kilkenny

Cainnech was born in 515 or 516, at Glengiven, near Dungiven in Ulster, the northern province in Ireland. His full name was Cainnech moccu Dalánn.

Cainnech's father Lughadh Leithdhearg was descended from the CorcoDalann or Ui Dalainn, a tribe whose ancestor, Dalann, is traced back to Fergus (King of Ulster), son of Ross, son of Rudhraighe. The Corco-Dalann were from an island referred to as "Insula Nuligi", and is usually identified with Inis-Doimhle or Inis-Uladh, which is now the Little Island, in the River Suir, south-east of Waterford.

Lughadh was a distinguished bard, a highly trained, professional itinerant poet. Lughadh settled at Glengiven, in what is now County Londonderry. Lughadh ended up under the favour and protection of the chief of Cianachta, and became the tutor of the chieftain's son, Geal Breagach.

Cainnech's mother was called Maul or Mella. She attained an eminent degree of sanctity. The church of Thompleamoul or Capella Sanctae Maulae seu Mellae, beside Kilkenny city, was dedicated to God under her invocation.

== Early life ==
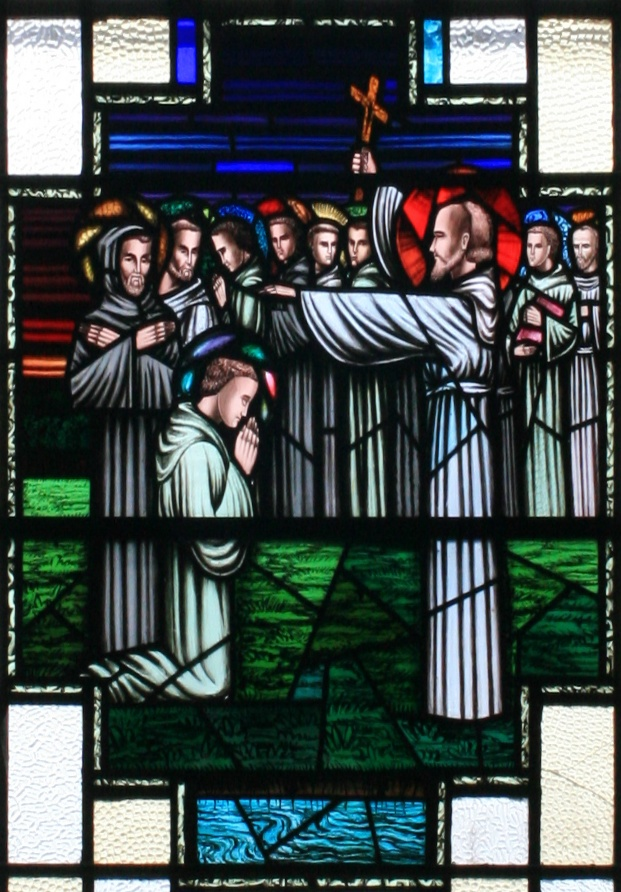
Finnian of Clonard imparting his blessing to the Twelve Apostles of Ireland

In early Christian Ireland the druid tradition collapsed, with the spread of the new faith. The study of Latin and Christian theology flourished in monasteries.

Cainnech spent his early years watching his chieftain's flocks. In 543 Cainnech became a pupil at Finnian's monastic school at Clonard. During the sixth century, some of the most significant names in the history of Irish Christianity studied at the Clonard monastery. Twelve students who studied under Finnian of Clonard became known as the Twelve Apostles of Ireland, Cainnech was one of these. It was at Clonard that Cainnech became a friend and companion of Colmcille (Columba).

In 544 he studied under Mobhí Clárainech at the school of Glasnevin, with Kieran of Clonmacnoise and Comgall of Bangor. When plague scattered that community, he went to Cadoc's monastery of Llancarfan in Glamorganshire in Wales, where he was ordained a priest in 545.

He left for Rome to obtain the blessing of the reigning pontiff. In 550 he returned to Glengiven, where he converted his foster brother, Geal-Breagach, who afterwards assisted him in founding Drumachose, in nearby Limavady.

== Scotland ==
In 565 Cainnech joined Columba in Scotland, where he is known as Kenneth. Adamnan tells of the arrival of Cainnech, on Iona. Columba had a prophecy of a "certain holy and excellent man, who will arrive here among us before evening." According to Adamnan, God provided Cainnech with a safe and calm crossing, even though the sea was perilous and stormy that day. Columba received him that evening with all honour and hospitality.

Cainnech built a church in the place now known as Saint Andrews. He built monastic cells on the island of Ibdon, possibly South Uist, and Eninis, an oratory called Lagan-Kenny on the shores of Loch Laggan (the remains of which are marked on the OS map), and a monastery in Fife on the banks of the Eden. The saint may have been an important saint in converting South Uist to Christianity. Cainnech's name is still recalled in the ruins of an ancient church, Kil-Chainnech on Tiree, in a burial ground, Kil-Chainnech, in Iona and Inch Kenneth off Mull.

== Return to Ireland ==
Cainnech spent a good deal of his time in County Meath and Ossory in what is now County Laois. In Ossory, he had a good repute with the king, Colmann son of Feradach. Colman gave him grants of land including Aghaboe ("the field of the Ox") which became his principal monastery. Aghaboe grew in importance, and in the 7th century sent Feargal as a missionary to the church of Salzburg, Austria. Aghaboe was for a time the site of the bishop's see until under Norman influence in the twelfth century the see transferred from Aghaboe to Kilkenny. In 1346 Diarmaid Mac Giollaphádraig burned the town of Aghaboe, and completely destroyed Cainnech's shrine along with his relics.

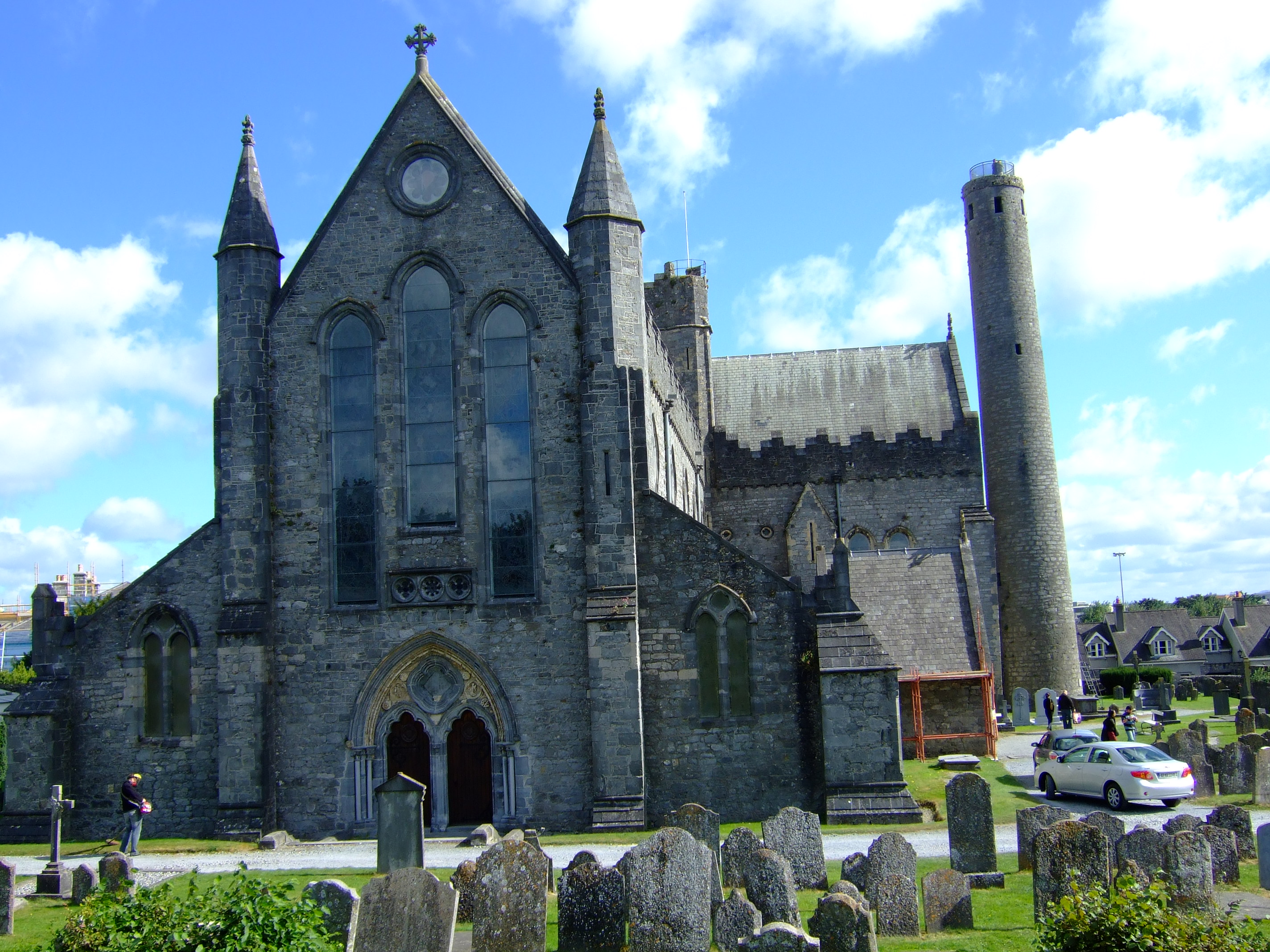
St. Canice's Cathedral in Kilkenny

Kilkenny (Irish: Cill Chainnigh "The Church of Cainnech") was originally the name of a church erected by or dedicated to Cainnech, but was afterwards extended to the townland and parish. Kilkenny was one of the last parts of Ireland to be converted to Christianity. Tradition asserts that in 597, Cainnech led a Christian force to Kilkenny to eliminate the last bastion of Druidic rule in Ireland. The last Archdruid of Ireland had retired with his Council to a mound in Kilkenny for safety. Cainnech led an army there and overcame them. He founded a monastery near what is now the Church of Ireland's St. Canice's Cathedral. He died and was interred at Abbey of Aghaboe in 599/600.

== Chain of Cainnech ==
In his old age Cainnech retired to an island in what was once Loch Cree, and wrote a commentary on all four Gospels. This became known as Glass Kinnich (Glas-Chainnigh) or the Chain of Cainnech. This was long preserved in his church and became a continuous commentary in the Middle Ages.

== Patronage ==
Cainnech is the patron of Aghaboe and together with Ciarán of Saigir, is one of the patrons of Kilkenny and the historic kingdom of Osraige. Cainnech is also the patron saint of the shipwrecked.

== Places bearing his name ==
- St. Canice's Church Katoomba, New South Wales, Australia
- Kilkenny City (Irish: Cill Chainnigh "The Church of Cainnech"), Ireland
- County Kilkenny, Ireland; named after the county's principal city
- St. Canice's Church in Finglas, Dublin
- Church of Cennych, Llangennech, Carmarthenshire, South Wales
- An ancient church, Kil-Chainnech on Tiree Island, Scotland
- A burial ground, Kil-Chainnech, in Iona, Scotland
- An oratory called Lagan-Kenny on the shores of Loch Lagan, Scotland
- Kilchenzie in Cantyre
- The remains of St Kenneth's Church (shown on OS maps) near Loch Laggan, in Scotland
- St. Canice Church, Roslyn Street, Sydney, Australia
- St. Canice Church, Nevada City, California
- St. Kenneth Church, Plymouth, Michigan
- St Canice's Church and St Canice's School in Westport, New Zealand
- St Canice's Church in Lockington, Victoria, Australia
- Mount Saint Canice convent in Sandy Bay, Tasmania, Australia
- Church of St. Canice, Kilkenny, Minnesota, US https://hredeemerparish.org/
- St. Kenny NS, Kilpatrick, Mullingar, Co. Westmeath, Ireland. https://www.stkenny.com/

== Troparion of St Cainnech (tone 8) ==
This is a Troparion of St Cainnech.

In honour thou dost rank with Ireland's Enlightener,

O Lover of the Desert, Composer of sacred verse,

Father of Monks and Founder of Monasteries, O Father Cainnech.

Labouring for Christ, both in thy native land and in Scotland,

thou art a tireless intercessor for the faithful.

Pray for us who hymn thee, that despite our frailty we may be granted great mercy.
