= Brendan of Birr =

Irish monastic saint (died 571)

Saint Brendan of Birr
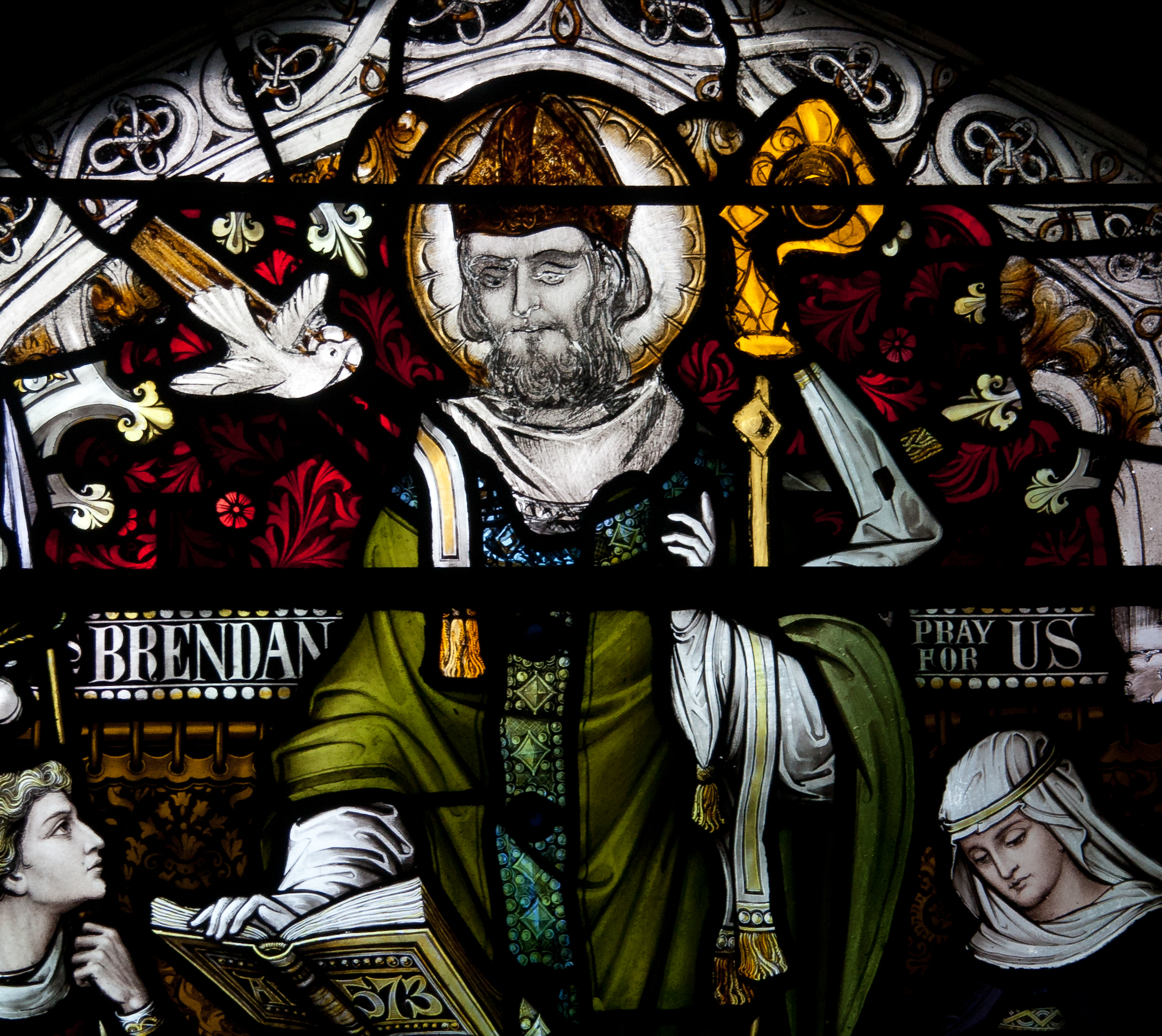
- Stained glass window depicting Brendan in St. Brendan's Church, Birr.

Abbot, Prophet of Ireland
- Died: c. 573; Birr, Kingdom of Munster
- Venerated in: Roman Catholic Church; Eastern Orthodox Church; Anglican Communion
- Canonized: Pre-Congregation
- Feast: 29 November

Brendan of Birr (died 29 November 571) was one of the early Irish monastic saints. He was a monk and later an abbot, of the 6th century. He is known as "Saint Brendan the Elder" to distinguish him from his contemporary and friend Brendan the Navigator of Clonfert. He was one of the Twelve Apostles of Ireland, a friend and disciple of Columba.

== Background ==
In early Christian Ireland the druid tradition collapsed under the pressure of the new faith. Study of Latin learning and Christian theology in monasteries flourished. Brendan became a pupil at the monastic school at Clonard Abbey. During the sixth century, some of the most significant names in the history of Irish Christianity studied at the Clonard monastery. It is said that the average number of scholars under instruction at Clonard was 3,000. Twelve students who studied under Finian became known as the Twelve Apostles of Ireland; Brendan of Birr was one of these.

== Teachings ==
Saint Finian had a penitential that was originally in Latin, which consisted of laws that Irish christians were to follow. The Penitential of Finnian consisted of rulings of different sins that usually involved a cleric and other themes such as magical women. These penitentials were not used to necessarily punish a sinner but rather give an opportunity to rehabilitate. These penances varied depending on the sin, sometimes they had to abstain themselves of wine and intercourse. Alongside that they had a diet of bread and water, and they had to pray. However, sometimes prayer had to be done through tears and weeps. These sins were measured by severity in which the sinner can refer to the penitential as a handbook on how they should handle the sin accordingly. Although Brendan does not have a penitential of his own, it is safe to assume that he agreed with the rulings Finian had since Brendan was Finian's student.

== Life ==
Brendan of Birr is said to have been of a noble Munster family. It was at Clonard that Brendan became a friend and companion of Ciarán of Saigir and Brendan of Clonfert.

He founded the monastery at Birr in central Ireland in about 540, serving as its abbot. He emerges from early Irish writings as a man of generous hospitality with a reputation for sanctity and spirituality who was an intuitive judge of character. He was considered one of the chief prophets of Ireland. This is evidenced both in his title ('Prophet of Ireland'), and by his attendance at the synod of Meltown, in which Columba was brought to trial over his role in the Battle of Cúl Dreimhne in 561. Brendan spoke on Columba's behalf, prompting the assembled clerics to sentence Columba with exile rather than excommunication. His friendship and support for Columba resulted in important connections between Birr and the Columban foundations. An adviser of Columba said that Columba saw a vision of Brendan's soul being carried away by angels after his death. He thereupon ordered for a mass to be said in his honour.

The feast day of Brendan of Birr is 29 November.

Brendan's monastery at Birr was later to produce the MacRegol Gospels, which are now housed at the Bodleian Library in Oxford. Note that while Brendan is traditionally considered a saint, he is not listed in the latest official, complete martyrology of the Catholic Church, the 2004 Martyrologium Romanum in Latin.

== See also ==
- History of Roman Catholicism in Ireland
- Early Christian Ireland
