= Comgall =

Medieval Irish abbot and saint

Saint Comgall
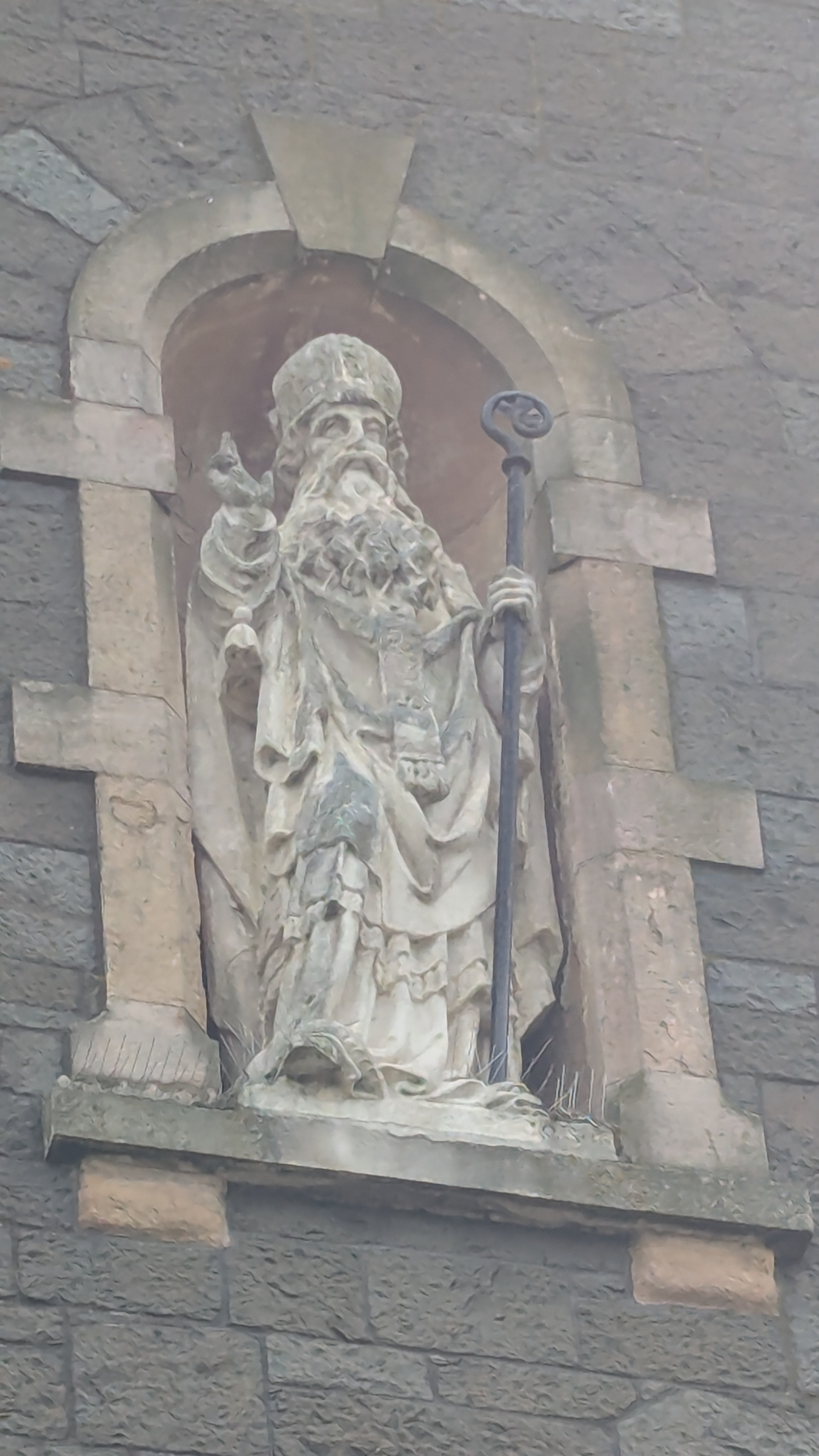
- Statue of Saint Comgall in the West niche of St. Comgall's Church, Antrim
- Born: c. 510–520; Dál nAraidi in Ulster, (Magheramorne in County Antrim)
- Died: 597 or 602
- Venerated in: Roman Catholic Church, Anglican Church; Orthodox Church
- Major shrine: St. Comgall's Church, Antrim
- Feast: 10 May

Saint Comgall (c. 510–520 – 597/602), an early Irish saint, was the founder and abbot of the influential abbey at Bangor in the north of Ireland.

== Life ==
According to the Irish annals, Comgall was born sometime between 510 and 520 in Dál nAraidi, in the northern province of Ulster, near the place now known as Magheramorne in present-day County Antrim. His father was Setna.

After serving as a soldier in his early life, he was educated under Fintan of Clonenagh and also studied under Finnian of Movilla, Mobhí Clárainech at Glasnevin, and Ciarán of Clonmacnoise.

He was ordained deacon and priest by Bishop Lugidius, either at Clonmacnoise or Connor. He lived for a while in Ulster on an island on Lough Erne, accompanied by a few friends who followed a severe form of monastic life. The regime was so austere that seven companions died of cold and hunger.

Initially intending to go to Britain, Comgall was dissuaded by Lugidius, the bishop who ordained him, at whose advice he remained in Ireland to spread the monastic life throughout the country. He founded a monastery at Bangor, County Down on the southern shore of Belfast Lough, directly opposite Carrickfergus. According to the Irish annals, Bangor was founded no later than 552, though James Ussher and most of the later writers on the subject assign the foundation to the year 555. Webb places it at 559.

He is said to have governed in Bangor and other houses over four thousand monks; all which religious men were employed in tillage or other manual labour.

Life in the monasteries was severe. Food was scant and plain. Herbs, water, and bread was customary. Even milk was considered an indulgence. At Bangor only one meal was allowed, and that not until evening. Confession was in public before the community. Severe acts of penance were frequent. Silence was observed at meals and at other times also, conversation being restricted to the minimum. Fasting was frequent and prolonged.

According to Adamnan's Life of Columba, there was a close connection between Comgall and Columba, though there does not appear to be sufficient authority for stating that Comgall was the disciple of Columba in any strict sense. Comgall was a friend to future saints Cormac, Brendan, and Canice. It is believed that among the monks trained by Comgall at Bangor, were Columbanus of Luxeuil-les-Bains (21 or 23 November) and Saint Moluag (25 June).

After a period of intense suffering, Comgall received the Eucharist from Saint Fiacre and died in the monastery at Bangor. The year of his death was either 602, according to Annals of Tigernach and Chronicon Scotorum, or 597, according to Annals of Inisfallen. His relics, which were kept at Bangor, were scattered during Viking raids in 822.

== Role ==
Comgall belonged to what is known as the Second Order of Irish Saints. These flourished in the Irish Church during the sixth century. They were for the most part educated in Britain, or received their training from those who had grown up under the influence of the British Schools. They were the founders of the great Irish monastic schools, and contributed much to the spread of monasticism in the Irish church. The Antiphonary of Bangor of the seventh century claimed that Comgall was 'strict, holy and constant'; and there has come down to us a Rule of Saint Comgall in Irish. St. Comgall is mentioned in the "Life of Columbanus" by Jonas, as the superior of Bangor, under whom St. Columbanus had studied. He is also mentioned under 10 May, his feast-day in the "Felire" of Óengus of Tallaght published by Whitley Stokes for the Henry Bradshaw Society (2nd ed.), and his name is commemorated in the Stowe Missal (MacCarthy), and in the Martyrology of Tallaght.
