= Mobhí Clárainech =

Early Irish monastic saint

Saint Mobhí or Berchan
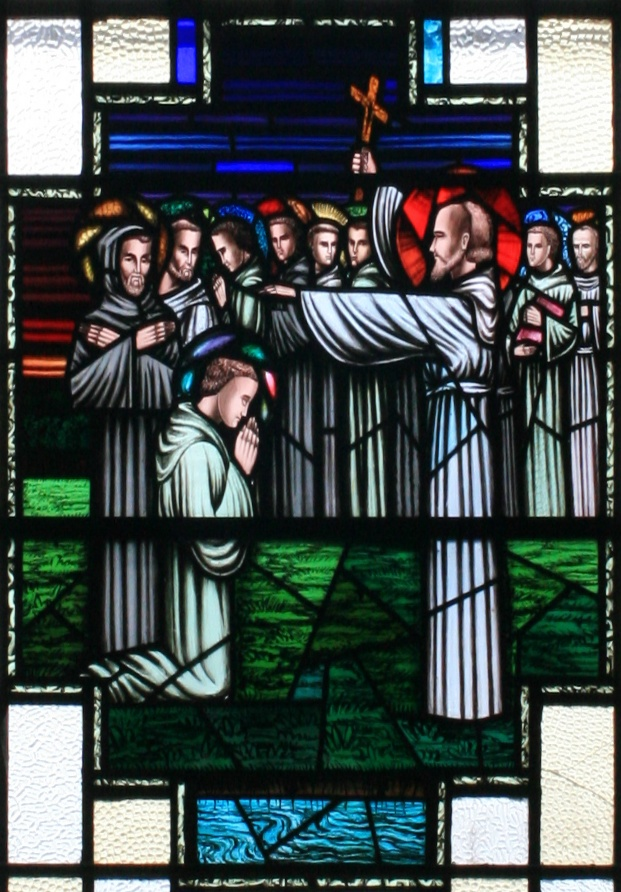
- Finnian of Clonard gives his blessing to the Twelve Apostles of Ireland

Apostle of Ireland Abbot
- Born: Glasnevin, Ireland
- Died: 12 October 544; Glasnevin, Ireland
- Venerated in: Roman Catholic Church, Eastern Orthodox Church
- Feast: 12 October

Mobhí Clárainech ([mˠəˈvʲiː ˈklˠɑːɾʲinʲəx], mə-VEE CLAWR-in-əkh; also Berchan; died 544) was an Irish early monastic saint, counted as one of the Twelve Apostles of Ireland. He was the abbot of a monastery in Glasnevin, where he was a teacher of Columba, Canice, Comgall, and Ciarán.

== Background ==
In John Colgan's work Trias Thaumaturga he is called "Berchan, that is, Mobhi Clairenach, of Glasnevin, son of Beoain, son of Bresal, son of Ailgin, son of Ignaidh, son of Athraid and Lugnaidh, Trinog, son of Brecdulb, son of Airt Corp, son of Caerbreniadh, in Glasnevin, in the territory of Galeny, near the River Liffey" (in regione Gallangabeg juxta Liffeum flumen). He was a relative of Brigit of Kildare.

The Martyrology of Oengus calls him "son of Beóán, of Corco trí, of the Luigni of Connaught," and says that his mother was "Uaine, Findbarr's daughter."

== Life ==
His epithet, clárenech, means "flat-faced" in Irish, a reference to his being born without eyes or a nose. The Martyrology of Oengus mentions that he was "table faced," ascribing the condition to the fact that he had been "conceived and brought forth, and of a dead woman he was begotten." The immediate cause of his strange physiognomy was that the "earth pressed him down" during the unfortunate circumstances of his birth. He was said to have been miraculously cured of this deformity when he splashed the baptismal water of Saint David on his face three times.

Mobhí was the teacher of a monastic school, where he was the tutor of many influential Irish saints. His school had about fifty students at its height. A legend is recorded about Mobhí and Columba (also called Columcille) that elaborates on the condition of these monastic schools:

The huts of the pupils are stated to have been on the west side of the river. On a certain night, the bell was rung for matins, there was a hard frost, and the river was frozen over, but Columcille passed with his clothes through it. "Bravely hast thou acted, O descendant of Niall," said Mobhí. "God is competent," said Columcille, "to relieve us of this difficulty." The students on their return from the church found all the huts placed on the east bank of the river, near the church."

It was Mobhí who gave Columba permission, with his last breath, to found the School of Derry. He died on 12 October 544 of the plague that had broken up his school.

== Veneration ==
Mobhí was recognised as a saint by his own pupils soon after his death. The 17th-century Martyrology of Donegal recounts the story that when Columba was preparing to take possession of the town of Doire from Aedh, son of Ainmire, he initially refused to do so because he did not have his Mobhí's permission. It was only when two of Mobhí's followers met him, carrying his girdle, and informed Columba that Mobhí was dead, that he accepted. Columba then remarked, "Good was the man who had this girdle, for it was never opened for gluttony, nor closed on falsehood". Columba later expanded that sentiment into a quatrain:

Mobhi's girdle, [Mobhi's girdle],
The girdle was not closed upon bravery of dress;
It was not opened for satiety,
It was not closed on a lie.

Archbishop John Healy, in his book Insula Sanctorum et Doctorum, called Mobhí "a great master of the spiritual life."

His feast day is celebrated on 12 October, and today there is a Church of Ireland parish in Glasnevin named for Saint Mobhí.

=== Martyrologies ===
The Martyrology of Oengus (c. 800)—the earliest Irish calendar of saints—lists the following on 12 October:

Dlom Fíacc ocus Fiachraig
onme, mor in máinsin,
moBií, balc a ṁbúaid sin,
in clárainech cáinsin.

Declare Fiacc and Fiachre
at the same time, great is that treasure!
Mobí, strong that triumph!
That fair flat-faced one.

The Martyrology of Donegal lists him on 12 October, the day of his death, and commemorates him in the following manner: "Mobhi Clairenech, abbot, of Glass Naoidhen, in Fine-Gall, on the brink of the river Lifè, on the north side; and Bearchán was another name for him."

While Mobhí is traditionally considered a saint, he is not listed in the latest official, complete martyrology of the Catholic Church, the 2004 Martyrologium Romanum in Latin.
