= St Columba's College =

There are several schools of the same name:

- St Columba's College, Dublin, a co-educational boarding school affiliated with the Church of Ireland in Dublin, Ireland
- St Columba's College, Essendon, an all-female Catholic secondary school in Melbourne, Australia
- St Columba's College, St Albans, a Catholic independent boys' school in St Albans, England
- St. Columba's College, Hazaribagh, India
- St Columba's College, Largs, former boys Catholic independent preparatory college in Largs, Scotland
- St Columba College, Andrews Farm, Adelaide, South Australia

== See also ==
- St. Columba's School (disambiguation)
