= Columba =

Irish monk and saint (521–597 AD)

Saint Columba
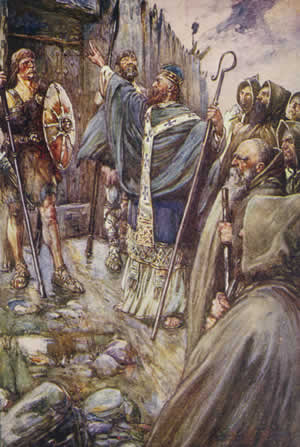
- Saint Columba, Apostle to the Picts

Apostle of the Picts
- Born: 7 December 521 AD; Gartan, Tyrconnell, Gaelic Ireland
- Died: 9 June 597 AD (aged 75); Iona, Dál Riata
- Venerated in: Catholic Church; Eastern Orthodox Church; Anglicanism; Lutheranism
- Major shrine: Iona, Scotland
- Feast: 9 June
- Attributes: Monk's robes, Celtic tonsure and crosier
- Patronage: Derry, floods, bookbinders, poets, Ireland and Scotland

Columba (/kəˈlʌmbəˌ ˈkɒlʌmbə/) or Colmcille (Note: Irish: Colm Cille, lit. 'church dove'; Scottish Gaelic: Calum Cille; Manx: Colum Keeilley; Old Norse: Kolban or at least partly reinterpreted as Kolbjørn) (7 December 521 – 9 June 597 AD) was an Irish abbot and missionary credited with spreading Christianity at the start of the Hiberno-Scottish mission in what became Scotland. He founded the important abbey on Iona, which became a dominant religious and political institution in the region for centuries. He is the patron saint of Derry and one of the patron saints of Ireland along with Patrick and Brigid. He was venerated by both the Gaels of Dál Riata and the Picts, and is remembered as one of the Twelve Apostles of Ireland.

Columba was born in Tyrconnell, studied under some of Ireland's most prominent church figures and founded several monasteries in the country. Around 563 AD he and his twelve companions crossed to Kintyre before settling on the island of Iona in the Hebrides, part of the Gaelic kingdom of Dál Riata. They founded Iona Abbey, which became a base for spreading Christianity among the pagan northern Pictish kingdoms. He remained active in Irish politics, though he spent most of the remainder of his life in what became Scotland. Three surviving early-medieval Latin hymns are attributed to him.

== Early life in Ireland ==
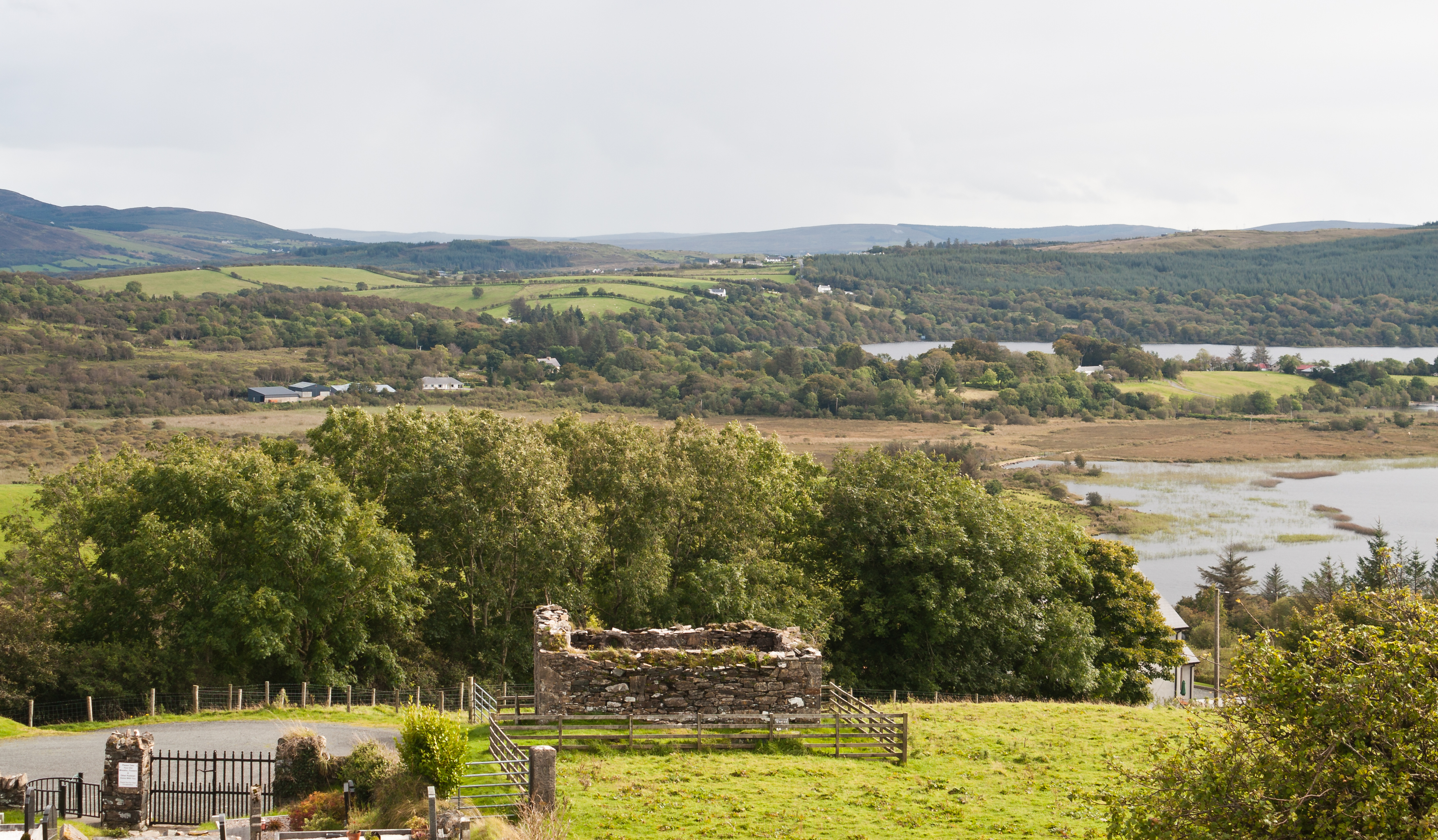
Ruins of Colmcille's Chapel at Gartan Lough

Columba was born to Fedlimid and Eithne of the Cenél Conaill in Gartan, a district beside Lough Gartan, in Tír Chonaill (mainly modern County Donegal, Ireland). On his father's side, he is claimed as being the great-great-grandson of Niall of the Nine Hostages, a pseudo-historical Irish high king of the 5th century. One tradition holds that he was born on a flagstone called Leac na Cumha in the townland of Lacknacoo. He was baptised in Temple-Douglas, in the County Donegal parish of Conwal (midway between Gartan and Letterkenny), by his teacher and foster-uncle Cruithnechán.

Columba lived in the remote district of what is now Glencolmcille (which was named after him) for roughly five years. It is not known for sure if his name at birth was Colmcille or if he adopted this name later in life; Adomnán (Eunan) of Iona thought it was his birth name but other Irish sources have claimed his name at birth was Crimthann (meaning 'fox'). In the Irish language his name means 'dove', which is the same name as the Prophet Jonah (Jonah in Hebrew is also 'dove'), which Adomnán of Iona, as well as other early Irish writers, were aware of, although it is not clear if he was deliberately named after Jonah or not. Columba is also Latin for dove, and the name of the bird genus.

When sufficiently advanced in letters he entered the monastic school of Movilla, at Newtownards, under Finnian of Movilla who had studied at Ninian's "Magnum Monasterium" on the shores of Galloway. He was about twenty, and a deacon when, having completed his training at Movilla, he travelled southwards into Leinster, where he became a pupil of an aged bard named Gemman. On leaving him, Columba entered the monastery of Clonard, governed at that time by Finnian, noted for sanctity and learning. Here he imbibed the traditions of the Welsh Church, for Finnian had been trained in the schools of David.

The study of Latin learning and Christian theology in monasteries flourished. Columba became a pupil at the monastic school at Clonard Abbey, situated on the River Boyne in modern County Meath. During the sixth century, some of the most significant names in the history of Insular Christianity studied at the Clonard monastery. The average number of scholars under instruction at Clonard was said to be 300. Columba was one of twelve students of Finnian of Clonard who became known as the Twelve Apostles of Ireland. He became a monk and eventually was ordained a priest.

Another preceptor of Columba was Mobhí Clárainech, whose monastery at Glasnevin was frequented by such famous men as Cainnech of Aghaboe, Comgall, and Ciarán. A pestilence which devastated Ireland in 544 caused the dispersion of Mobhi's disciples, and Columba returned to Ulster, the land of his kindred.

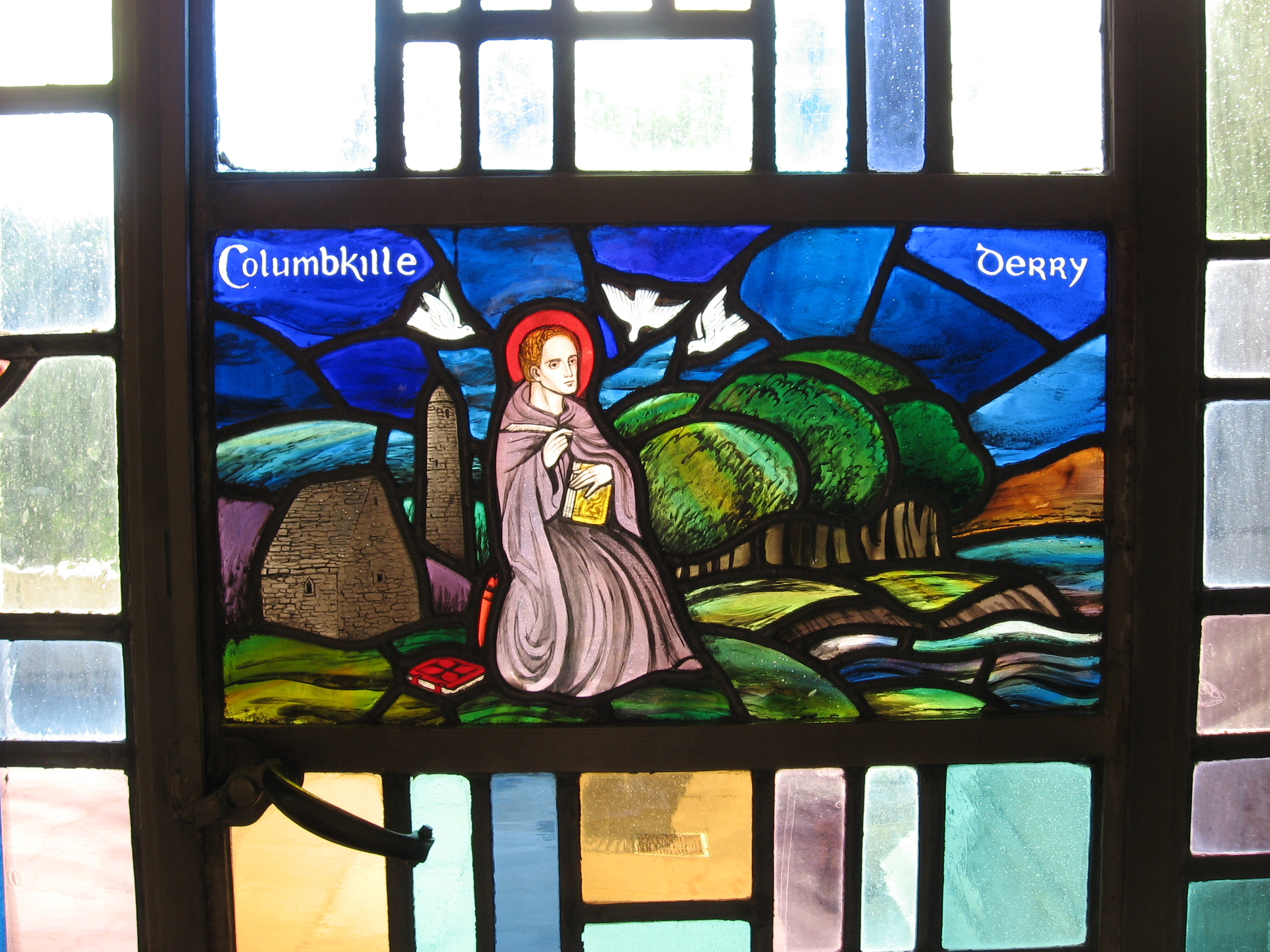
Stained-glass window of Colmcille founding Derry

The foundation of several important monasteries marked the following years: Derry, at the southern edge of Inishowen; Durrow, County Offaly; Kells, County Meath; and Swords, County Dublin. While at Derry it is said that he planned a pilgrimage to Rome and Jerusalem, but did not proceed farther than Tours. From Tours, he brought a copy of those gospels that had lain on the bosom of Martin for 100 years. This relic was deposited in Derry. St Colmcille is also believed to have established a Church on Inishkea North, County Mayo which is named St Colmcille's Church. Another monastery was established by St Colmcille at Carrickmore, County Tyrone. The church of St Colmcille stands within the Parish of Termonmaguirc on Rockstown Road in Carrickmore.

Some traditions assert that sometime around 560 Columba became involved in a quarrel with Finnian of Moville of Movilla Abbey over a psalter. Columba copied the manuscript at the scriptorium under Finnian, intending to keep the copy. Finnian disputed his right to keep it. There is a suggestion that this conflict resulted in the Battle of Cúl Dreimhne in Cairbre Drom Cliabh (now in County Sligo) in 561, during which many men were killed. Richard Sharpe, translator of Adomnán's Life of St. Columba (referenced in the bibliography below) makes a stern caution at this point against accepting the many references that link the battle and Columba's leaving of Ireland, even though there is evidence in the annals that Columba supported his own king against the high king. Political conflicts that had existed for some time resulted in the clan Neill's battle against King Diarmait at Cooldrevny in 561. An issue, for example, was the king's violation of the right of sanctuary belonging to Columba's person as a monk on the occasion of the murder of Prince Curnan, Columba's kinsman.

Prince Curnan of Connacht, who had fatally injured a rival in a hurling match and had taken refuge with Columba, was dragged from his protector's arms and slain by Diarmaid's men, in defiance of the rights of sanctuary.

A synod of clerics and scholars threatened to excommunicate him for these deaths, but Brendan of Birr spoke on his behalf. Eventually, the process was deemed a miscarriage of justice. Columba's own conscience was uneasy, and on the advice of an aged hermit, Molaise, he resolved to expiate his sense of offence by departing Ireland. The term "exile" is used in some references. This, too, can be disputed, for the term "pilgrimage" is used more frequently in the literature about him. A marker at Stroove Beach on the Inishowen Peninsula commemorates the place where Columba set sail for Scotland. He left Ireland, but through the following years, he returned several times to visit the communities he had founded there.

Columba's copy of the psalter has been traditionally associated with the Cathach of St. Columba. In 574/575, during his return for the Synod of Drum Ceat, he founded the monastery of Drumcliff in Cairbre, now County Sligo.

== Scotland ==
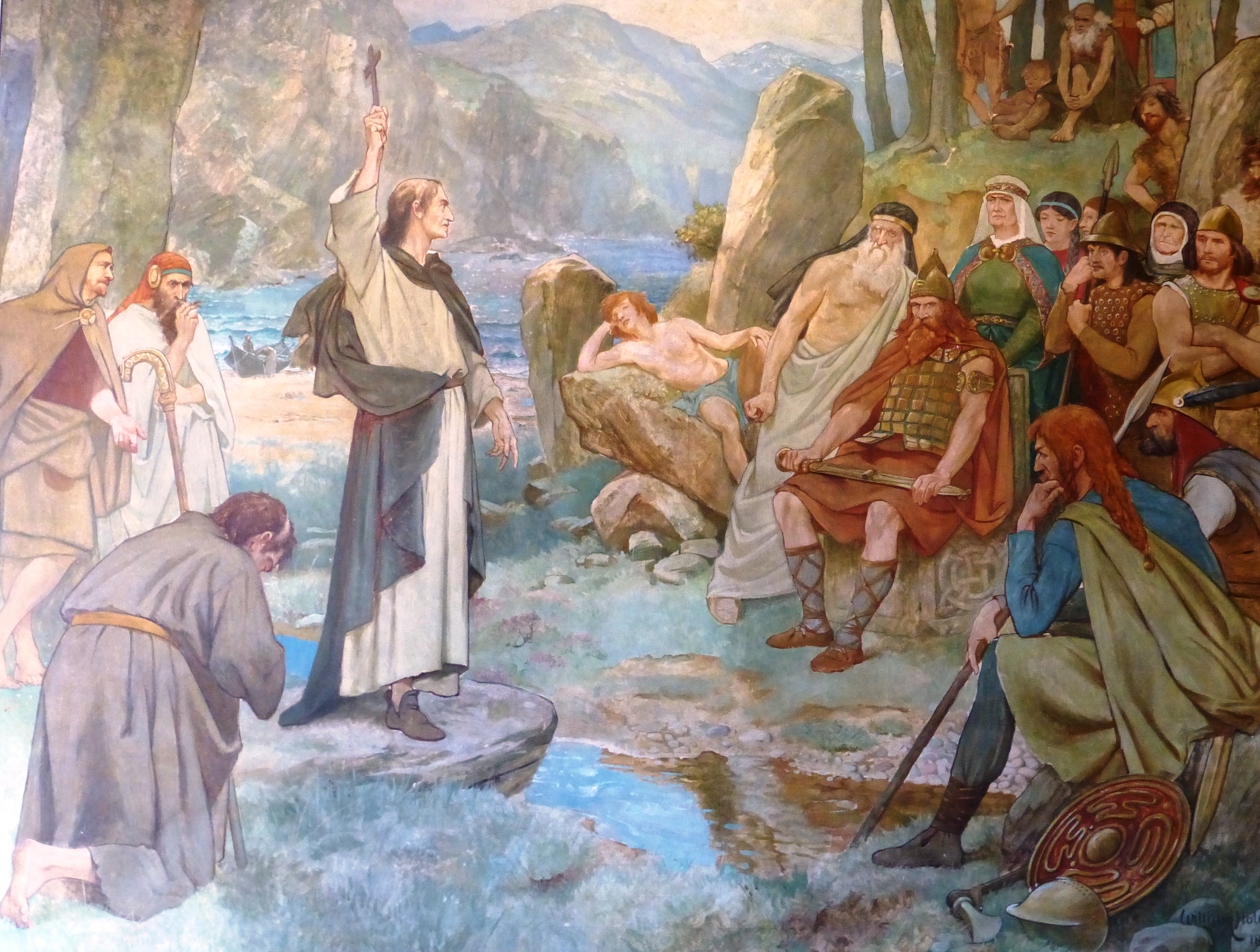
Nineteenth century illustration of Columba's meeting with King Bridei, by William Hole

In 563, he travelled to Scotland with twelve companions (said to include Odran of Iona) in a wicker currach covered with leather. According to legend he first landed on the Kintyre Peninsula, near Southend. However, being still in sight of Ulster, he moved farther north up the west coast of Scotland. The island of Iona was made over to him by his kinsman Conall mac Comgaill King of Dál Riata, who perhaps had invited him to come to Scotland in the first place. However, there is a sense in which he was not leaving his native people, as the Ulster Gaels had been inhabiting the west coast of Scotland for the previous couple of centuries. Aside from the services he provided guiding the only centre of literacy in the region, his reputation as a holy man led to his role as a diplomat among the tribes.

He visited the pagan King Bridei, King of Fortriu, at his base in Inverness, winning Bridei's respect, although not his conversion. He subsequently played a major role in the politics of the country. Adomnán wrote that Columba communicated with the Picts through an unnamed interpreter.

There are also many stories of miracles which he performed during his work to convert the Picts, the most famous being his encounter with an unidentified animal that some have equated with the Loch Ness Monster in 565. It is said that he banished a ferocious "water beast" to the depths of the River Ness after it had killed a Pict and then tried to attack Columba's disciple, Lugne (see Vita Columbae Book 2 below).

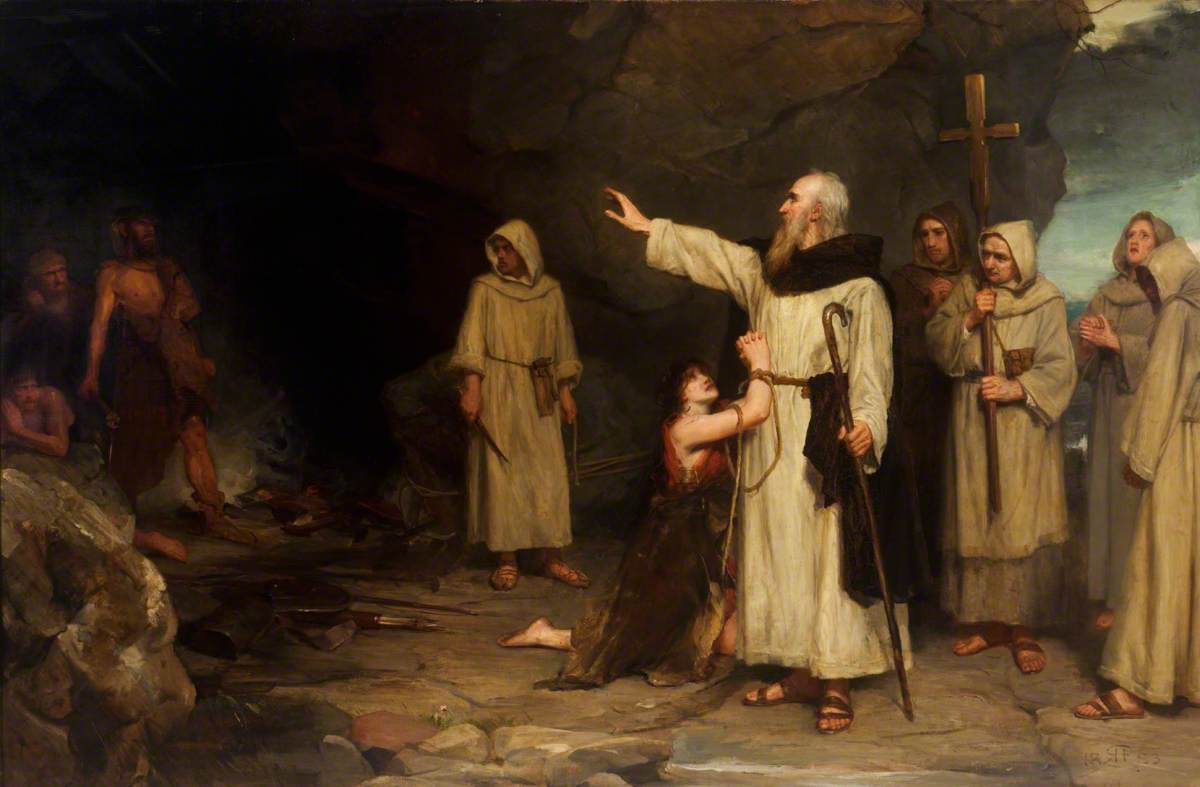
"Saint Columba Rescuing a Captive", 19th-century painting by Robert Herdman

He was also very energetic in his work as a missionary, and, in addition to founding several churches in the Hebrides, he worked to turn his monastery at Iona into a school for missionaries. He was a renowned man of letters, having written several hymns and being credited with having transcribed 300 books. One of the few, if not the only, times he left Scotland was towards the end of his life, when he returned to Ireland to found the monastery at Durrow.

According to traditional sources, Columba died in Iona on Sunday, 9 June 597, and was buried by his monks in the abbey he created. However, Dr. Daniel P. Mc Carthy disputes this and assigns a date of 593 to Columba's death. The Annals record the first Viking raid made upon Iona in A.D. 795, with further raids occurring in 802, 806 and 825. Columba's relics were finally removed in 849 and divided between Scotland and Ireland.

== Legacy ==
=== Ireland ===
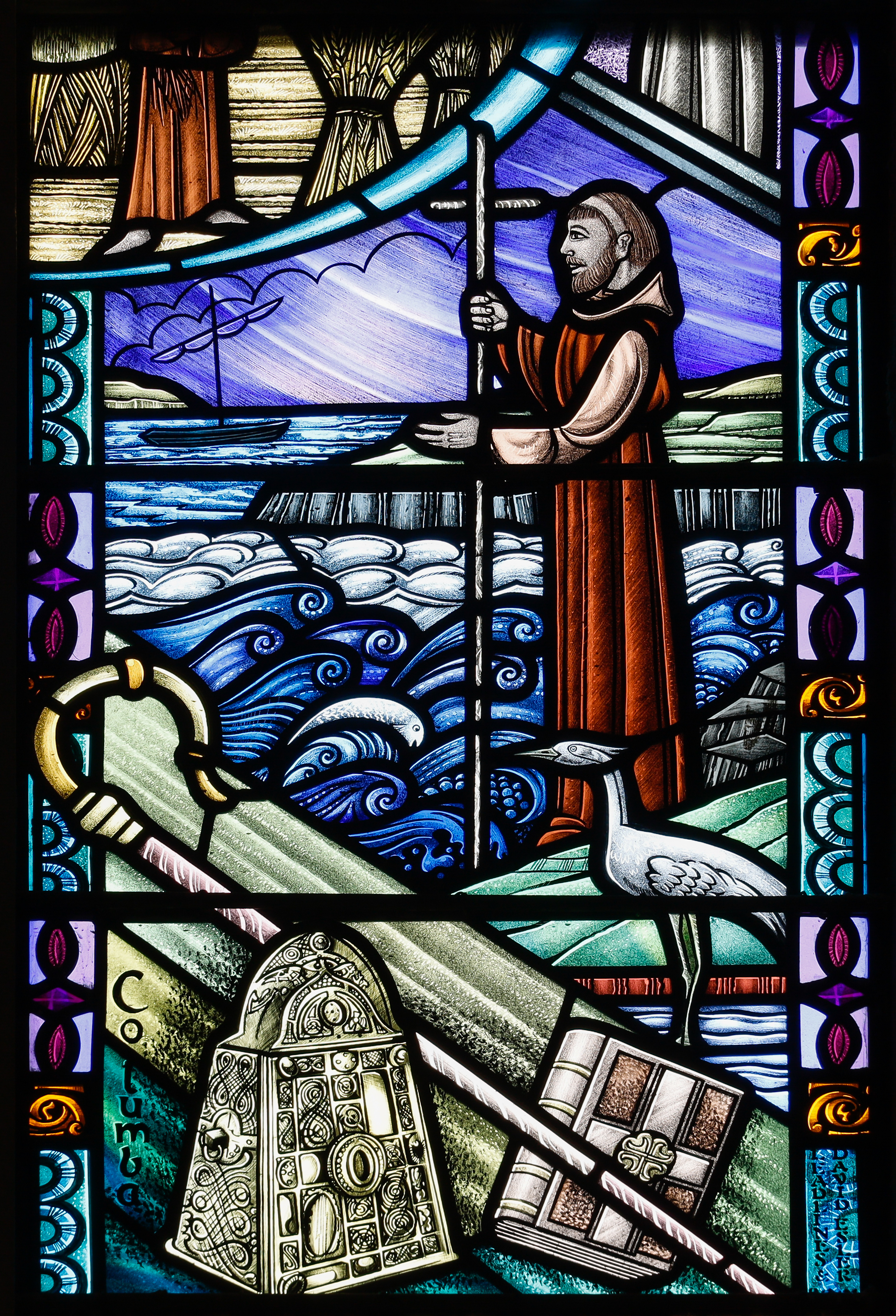
Stained-glass window of St Columba, St Patrick's Church of Ireland, Armagh

In Ireland, the saint is commonly known as Colmcille.

Colmcille is one of the three patron saints of Ireland, after Patrick and Brigid of Kildare.

Colmcille is the patron saint of the city of Derry, where he founded a monastic settlement in c. 540. The name of the city in Irish is Doire Cholm Cille and is derived from the native oak trees in the area and the city's association with Colmcille. The Catholic Church of Saint Colmcille's Long Tower, and the Church of Ireland St Augustine's Church both claim to stand at the spot of this original settlement. The Church of Ireland Cathedral, St. Columb's Cathedral, and the largest park in the city, St. Columb's Park, are named in his honour. The Catholic Boys' Grammar School, St. Columb's College, has him as Patron and namesake.

St. Columba's National School in Glasnevin is a girls' school named after the saint.

St. Colmcille's Primary School and St. Colmcille's Community School are two schools in Knocklyon, Dublin, named after him, with the former having an annual day dedicated to the saint on 9 June.

The town of Swords, County Dublin was reputedly founded by Colmcille in 560 AD. St. Colmcille's Boys' National School and St. Colmcille's Girls' National School, both located in the town of Swords, are also named after the Saint as is one of the local gaelic teams, Naomh Colmcille.

The Columba Press, a religious and spiritual book company based in Dublin, is named after Colmcille.

Aer Lingus, Ireland's national flag carrier has named one of its Airbus A330 aircraft in commemoration of the saint (reg: EI-DUO).

As of June 2025, a new Public Holiday in honour of Saint Colmcille/Columba is pending approval from the Irish Government after having been proposed by Donegal County Council.

=== Scotland ===
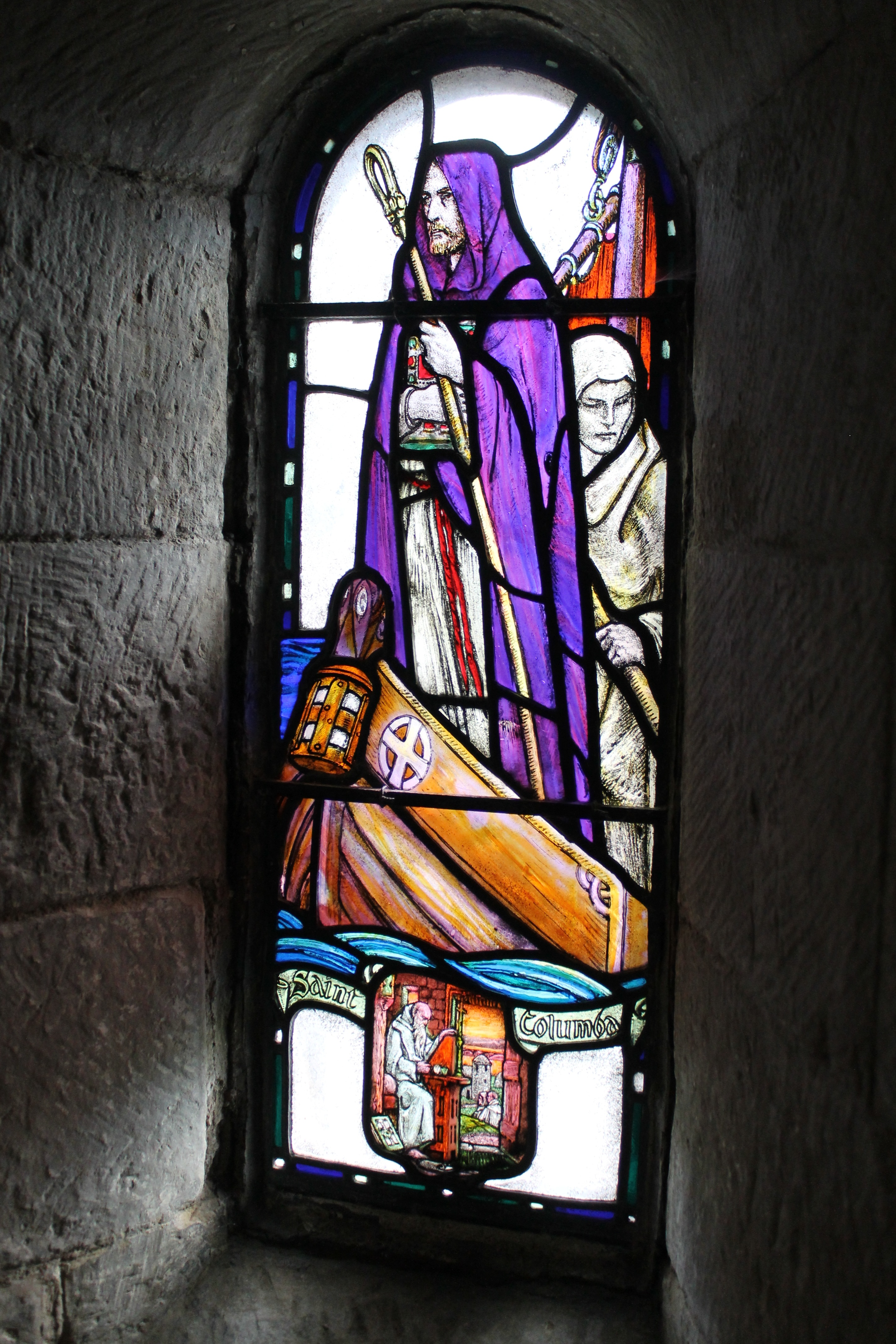
Stained-glass window of St Columba, St Margaret's Chapel, Edinburgh

Columba is credited as being a leading figure in the revitalisation of monasticism. The Clan Malcolm/Clan McCallum claims its name from Columba and was reputedly founded by the descendants of his original followers. It is also said that Clan Robertson, Clan Donnachaidh / Duncan, and Clan Dundas are heirs of Columba. This being derived from male descent from Crinan, lay abbot of Dunkeld. Clan MacKinnon may also have some claim to being spiritual descendants of St Columba. Sir Iain Moncreiffe of that Ilk speculated that Clan MacKinnon belonged to the kindred of Columba, noting the MacKinnon Arms bore the hand of Columba holding the Cross, and the several Mackinnon abbots of Iona. The Macdonald Lords of the Isles dealt with them, imprisoning one who was convicted of treachery since Iona was the spiritual seat of Clan Donald.

The cathedral of the Catholic Diocese of Argyll and the Isles is placed under the patronage of Saint Columba, as are numerous Catholic schools and parishes throughout the nation. The Scottish Episcopal Church, the Church of Scotland, and the Evangelical Lutheran Church of England also have parishes dedicated to him. The village of Kilmacolm in Renfrewshire is also derived from Colmcille's name.

St Columba's Hospice, a prominent hospice in Edinburgh, is named after the saint.

=== Poetry ===
Columba currently has two poems attributed to him: "Adiutor Laborantium" and "Altus Prosator". Both poems are examples of Abecedarian hymns in Latin written while Columba was at the Iona Abbey.

The shorter of the two poems, "Adiutor Laborantium" consists of twenty-seven lines of eight syllables each, with each line following the format of an Abecedarian hymn using the Classical Latin alphabet save for lines 10–11 and 25–27. The content of the poem addresses God as a helper, ruler, guard, defender and lifter for those who are good and an enemy of sinners whom he will punish.

"Altus Prosator" consists of twenty-three stanzas sixteen syllables long, with the first containing seven lines and six lines in each subsequent stanza. It uses the same format and alphabet as "Adiutor Laborantium" except with each stanza starting with a different letter rather than each line. The poem tells a story over three parts split into the beginning of time, the history of Creation, and the Apocalypse or end of time.

=== Other ===
Columba is honoured in the Anglican communion, including the Church of England and the Episcopal Church, on 9 June. The Church of St. Columba in Ottawa is part of the Anglican Diocese of Ottawa. St. Columba Anglican Church is located in Tofino, British Columbia.

St. Columba's Episcopal Church is in Washington, D.C. There is a St. Columba's Presbyterian Church in Peppermint Grove, Western Australia. The Saint-Columba Presbyterian Church in Palmerstone, Vacoas-Phoenix is part of the Presbyterian Church in Mauritius.

Columba is the patron saint of the Roman Catholic Diocese of Youngstown, Ohio. The Cathedral there is named for him. Iona University, in New Rochelle, New York, is named after the island on which Columba established his first monastery in Scotland, as is Iona College in Windsor, Ontario, Iona Presentation College, Perth, and Iona College Geelong in Charlemont, Victoria.

In Bangor, Pennsylvania, there is a megalith park called Columcille, which is open to the public.

There are at least four pipe bands named for him; one each from Tullamore, Ireland, from Derry, Northern Ireland, from Kearny, New Jersey, and from Cape Cod, Massachusetts.

St. Columba's School, one of the most prominent English-Medium schools in India, run by the Irish Christian Brothers, is also named after the saint.

St Columba Anglican School in Port Macquarie Australia, part of the Grafton Anglican Diocese is also named after the saint.

The Munich GAA is named München Colmcilles.

Saint Columba's Feast Day, 9 June, has been designated as International Celtic Art Day. The Book of Kells and the Book of Durrow, great medieval masterpieces of Celtic art, are associated with Columba.

Benjamin Britten composed A Hymn of St Columba for choir and organ in 1962, setting a poem by the saint, on the occasion of the 1,400th anniversary of his voyage to Iona.

In Iona, Nova Scotia a Roman Catholic St. Columba parish was established in 1873. It was destroyed by fire in 1900, in 1902 a brick church was errected and stands today. Its part of the Diocese of Antigonish.

== Primary sources ==
The main source of information about Columba's life is the Life of Columba (Latin: Vita Columbae), a hagiography written by Adomnán, one of Columba's successors at Iona, in the style of "saints' lives" narratives that had become widespread throughout medieval Europe. Both the Life of Columba and Bede (672/673–735) record Columba's visit to Bridei. Whereas Adomnán just tells us that Columba visited Bridei, Bede relates a later, perhaps Pictish tradition, whereby Columba actually converts the Pictish king. Another early source is a poem in praise of Columba, most probably commissioned by Columba's kinsman, the King of the Uí Néill clan. It was almost certainly written within three or four years of Columba's death and is the earliest vernacular poem in European history. It consists of twenty-five stanzas of four verses of seven syllables each, called the Amra Coluim Chille.

Through the reputation of its venerable founder and its position as a major European centre of learning, Columba's Iona became a place of pilgrimage. Columba is historically revered as a warrior saint and was often invoked for victory in battle. Some of his relics were removed in 849 and divided between Alba and Ireland. Relics of Columba were carried before Scottish armies in the reliquary made at Iona in the mid-8th century called the Brecbennoch. Legend has it that the Brecbennoch was carried to the Battle of Bannockburn (24 June 1314) by the vastly outnumbered Scots army and the intercession of Columba helped them to victory. Since the 19th century the "Brecbennoch of St. Columba" has been identified with the Monymusk Reliquary, although this is now doubted by scholars.

In the Antiphoner of Inchcolm Abbey, the "Iona of the East" (situated on an island in the Firth of Forth), a 14th-century prayer begins O Columba spes Scotorum... "O Columba, hope of the Scots".

== See also ==
- Celtic Christianity
- Early Christian Ireland
- List of people on the postage stamps of Ireland
- St. Columba's School
- Saint Columba, patron saint archive
- Scotland in the Early Middle Ages

| New creation | Abbot of Iona died 597 | Succeeded by Baithéne |
