= Eunan =

Eunan (/ˈjuːnən/ YOO-nən) is a common name:

- Adomnán (r. 679–704), abbot of Iona
- Eunan O'Halpin, Irish academic
- Eunan O'Kane (born 1990), Irish professional footballer
- Eunan O'Neill (born 1982), Irish television presenter

Eunan may also refer to:

- St Eunan's Cathedral (disambiguation), Christian churches
- St Eunan's College, a school
- St Eunan's GAA, a Gaelic football and hurling club
