= Twelve Apostles of Ireland =

Irish monastic saints in 6th century

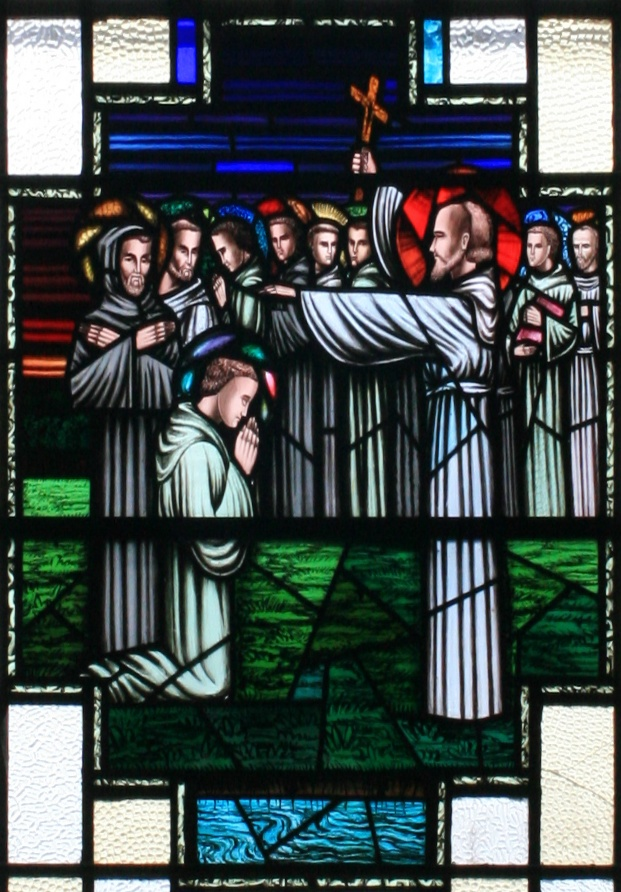
St. Finnian imparting his blessing to the Twelve Apostles of Ireland

The Twelve Apostles of Ireland (also known as Twelve Apostles of Erin, Irish: Dhá Aspal Déag na hÉireann) were twelve early Irish monastic saints of the sixth century who studied under St Finnian (d. 549) at his famous monastic school Clonard Abbey at Cluain-Eraird (Erard's Meadow), now Clonard in County Meath.

== History ==
Clonard Abbey, situated on the River Boyne in modern County Meath was one of the main monastic schools in early Christian Ireland. During the 6th century, some of the most significant names in the history of Irish Christianity studied at the Clonard monastery. It is said that the average number of scholars under instruction at Clonard was 3,000. Twelve students who studied under St Finian became known as the "Twelve Apostles of Ireland".

This tradition is recorded in the 17th century, possibly based on older sources. The twelve saints are grouped together as such in the text Dá apstol décc na hÉrenn ("The Twelve Apostles of Ireland", the modern Irish being Dhá Aspal Déag na hÉireann). The text is preserved in a manuscript that belonged to Michael O'Clery (Brussels, Bibliothèque Royale MS 2324–2340), dated 1629.

In the narrative, the twelve apostles of Ireland are gathered together for a feast in the house of St Finian, and a magical flower appears in their midst. It is decided that a voyage to the flower's homeland is to be undertaken by one of them, the choice of person then being determined by casting lots. When, however, the lot falls on the old Brendan of Birr, his younger namesake Brendan moccu Altae goes in his stead. Brendan sets out with many companions and undergoes many adventures, much as related in Brendan's Life.

== The Twelve Apostles ==
1. Saint Ciarán of Saighir (Seir-Kieran). In the Martyrology of Oengus, saint Ciarán of Saighir is not listed as one of the twelve apostles of Ireland and instead is replaced by Finnian of Clonard himself. The numbering of Finnian as one of the Twelve, and not Ciarán of Saighir, appears to be the older tradition, by which Ciarán was attached to pair with Ciarán of Clon.
2. Saint Ciarán of Clonmacnoise, on the Shannon, in the barony of Garrycastle, County Offaly, died in the year 549.
3. Saint Brendan of Birr, now Birr, County Offaly. He died on 29 November 571.
4. Saint Brendan of Clonfert (Brendan the Navigator). He was the son of Finnloga, the patron saint of the see of Clonfert, in County Galway, was born in 484, and died in 577 aged 94.
5. Saint Columba of Terryglass, abbot of Tír Dhá Ghlas, (Terryglass), in the barony of Lower Ormond, in the county of Tipperary, and died in 552.
6. Saint Columba (or Colmcille, as he is commonly known in Ireland) was born in the year 521 at Gartan in present day County Donegal. He died in the year 597, aged 75 on the island of Iona. Columba was the outstanding figure among the Gaelic missionary monks who his advocates claim led a Hiberno-Scottish mission to introduce Christianity to the Kingdom of the Picts during the early medieval period. He is considered one of the three patron saints of Ireland.
7. Saint Mobhí of Glasnevin, patron of Glasnaidhen, (Glasnevin), near Dublin. He died on 12 October 545.
8. Saint Ruadhán of Lorrha, the patron of Lothra, (Lorrha), in County Tipperary. He died on 15 April 584.
9. Saint Seanán of Inis Cathaigh (or Iniscathay or Scattery Island in English) off the southwest coast of County Clare.
10. Saint Ninnidh the Saintly of Lough Erne, the Pious, the patron of the parish of Inis Muighe Samh, (Inismacsaint), in the north-west of County Fermanagh. He was alive in 530 but the year of his death is uncertain.
11. Saint Laisrén mac Nad Froích, the son of Nad Fraéch, he was the brother of Óengus, the first Christian king of Munster and died in 564.
12. Saint Canice (or Cainneach in the Irish language) the patron of Achadh Bhó (Aghaboe) in County Laois, who died in 600 at the age of 84.
