= Saint Eunan =

Saint Eunan (/ˈjuːnən/ YOO-nən) may refer to Adomnán, abbot of Iona.

The name may also refer to:

- St Eunan's Cathedral (disambiguation), Christian churches
- St Eunan's College, a school
- St Eunan's GAA, a Gaelic football and hurling club
