= Faithleach of Clontuskert =

Irish saint (7th century)

Faithleach of Clontuskert (fl. AD 600) was an Irish Christian saint. His name, pronounced [fˠalʲax] (FAWL-yokh), literally means 'seer-healer' (cf. the Vates and archaic English leech, 'doctor').

Faithleach was one of the four sons of Fionnlugh mac Olchú, and a brother of Brendan of Clonfert. His other brothers were Domhainghin of Tuaim Múscraighe and Faolán of Ceall Tulach. In 520 he founded a monastery at Cloontuskert, located in south-east County Galway.
