= Penitential of Finnian =

Sixth-century set of church rules

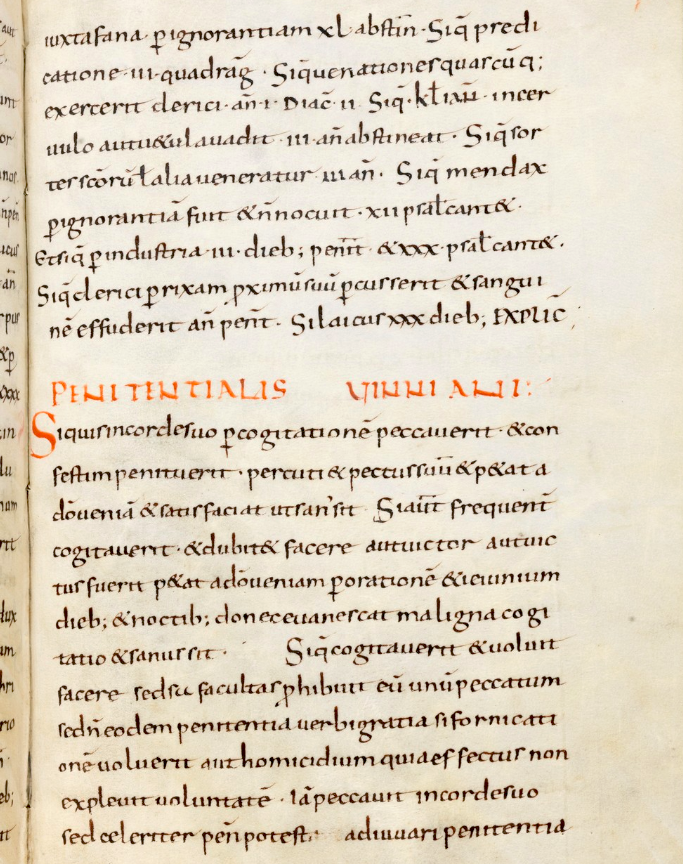
Incipit of the Penitential of Finnian.

The Penitential of Finnian (Note: Paenitentiale Vinniani or Penitentialis Vinniani in Latin.) is a sixth-century penitential believed to have been written by either Finnian of Clonard or Finnian of Movilla. It contains fifty canons that apply to both the clergy and the laity, but with stricter penances for the former.

== Composition ==
The identity of the titular author, "Uinniaus", (Note: Also "Uinniau"; the name was Gaelicised to "Finniau", which was subsequently mistranscribed as "Finnian".) is unclear, with the leading candidates being Finnian of Clonard and Finnian of Movilla, both of whom were Irish clergymen who lived in the sixth century. (Note: Some historians have argued that Uinniaus was a British cleric whose identity was reappropriated by the churches in Clonard and Movilla.) The contents of Finnian's penitential are mostly original, with some influence from Irish and Welsh sources in addition to the writings of Paul the Apostle, Jerome, and John Cassian. According to a letter from Columbanus to Pope Gregory I, the author of Finnian's penitential also consulted Gildas about ecclesiastical discipline.

Thomas Charles-Edwards surmises that the author wrote the penitential some time before 591 and was likely to have been Columbanus's mentor, since the Penitential of Finnian is one of the key sources cited in Columbanus' own penitential that was published in 591.

The Penitential of Finnian is believed to be the earliest known text of its kind. There are two extant manuscripts of the almost complete text: the first, which dates back to the early ninth century, is housed at the abbey library of Saint Gall, while the second, which dates back to the late eighth century, is housed at the Austrian National Library. Portions of the penitential survive in two other Breton manuscripts.

== Content ==
Originally written in Latin, most of the fifty canons in the penitential are applicable to both the clergy and the laity. However, the author notes that the clergy are liable to stricter penances. Concerns raised in the penitential range from abortion to witchcraft. The typical penances offered are either abstinence from food or abstinence from sex, with the most serious sins such as homicide warranting a seven-year exile.

The author also distinguishes between various kinds of intentions and their corresponding penances. For instance, somebody who immediately repented of his sinful thoughts would be forgiven by "beating his breast and seeking God's pardon"; on the other hand, somebody who would have acted on his sinful thoughts, if only he had the opportunity, had to "abstain from meat and wine for a whole year, eating only bread and water."
