= Ciarán of Clonmacnoise =

Irish bishop and monastic saint (c. 516 – c. 549)

Saint Ciarán of Clonmacnoise
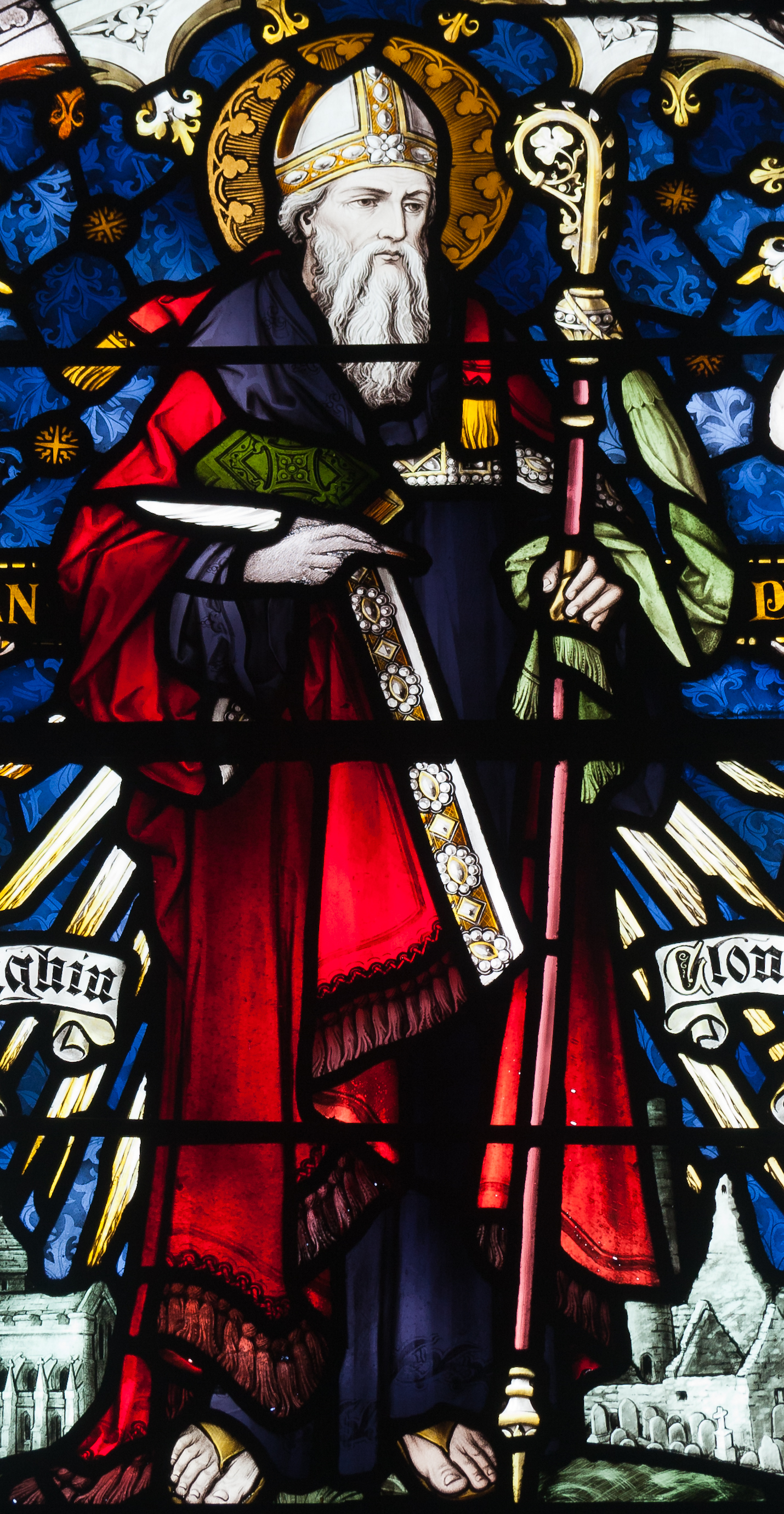
- A stained glass of St. Ciarán from St. Brendan's Church, Birr, County Offaly, Ireland

Abbot of Clonmacnoise
- Born: c.516 Kingdom of Connacht (today County Roscommon, Ireland)
- Died: 549; Clonmacnoise, Kingdom of Meath (today County Offaly, Ireland)
- Venerated in: Roman Catholic Church; Orthodox Church
- Feast: 9 September
- Patronage: Connacht

Saint Ciarán of Clonmacnoise (c. 516 – c. 549), supposedly born Ciarán mac an tSaeir ("son of the carpenter"), was one of the Twelve Apostles of Ireland and the first abbot of Clonmacnoise. He is sometimes called Ciarán the Younger to distinguish him from the 5th-century Saint Ciarán the Elder who was bishop of Osraige. His name produced many variant spellings, including Ceran, Kieran, Kyran, Queran and Queranus.

== Life ==
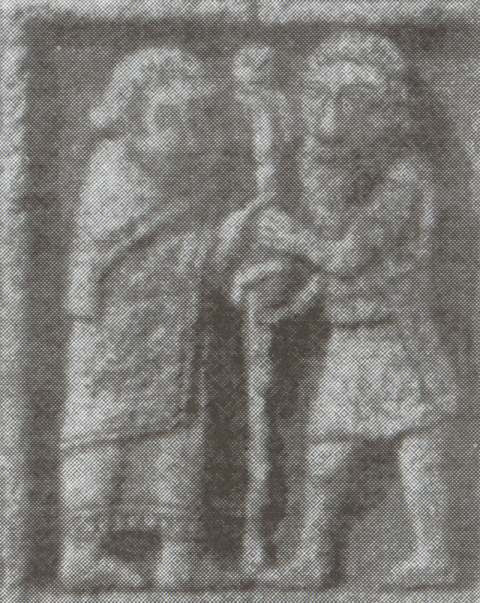
Ciarán (left) and Diarmait mac Cerbaill depicted on the Cross of the Scriptures, driving in a stake at the foundation of Clonmacnoise

Ciarán was born in around 516 in County Roscommon, Connacht, in Ireland. His father was a carpenter and chariot maker. As a boy, Ciarán worked as a cattle herder.

He was a student of Finian's at Clonard and in time became a teacher, himself. Columba of Iona said of Ciarán, "He was a lamp, blazing with the light of wisdom." In about 534, he left Clonard for Inishmore where he studied under Enda of Aran, who ordained him a priest and advised him to build a church and monastery in the middle of Ireland. Later, he travelled to Senan on Scattery Island (in about 541). In 544, he finally settled in Clonmacnoise, where he founded the Monastery of Clonmacnoise with ten fellow companions. As abbot, he worked on the first buildings of the monastery; however, he died about seven months later of a plague, in his early thirties. His feast day is 9 September.

== Legends ==
Various legends are connected to St Ciarán. One of the most famous relates that it was his cow – which he took with him as payment when he went to Clonard and gave milk to all at the Abbey – which supplied the parchment for the Leobr na h'Uidre, Book of the Dun Cow, one of the oldest and most important Irish literary collections, compiled by a Clonmacnoise scribe in 1106.

One story tells that he lent his copy of the Gospel of St Matthew to fellow-student St Ninnidh. When Finnian tested the class, Ciarán knew only the first half of the Gospel. The other students laughed and called him "Ciarán half-Matthew." St Finnian silenced them and said, "Not Ciarán half-Matthew, but Ciarán half-Ireland, for he will have half the country and the rest of us will have the other half."

Another tale relates that as a student, a young fox would take his writings to his master, until it was old enough to eat his satchel. Yet another tale tells of the other Irish saints envying him to such a degree that every one of them (apart from St Columba) prayed for his early death; and finally, he is supposed to have told his followers that upon his death, they were to leave his bones upon the hillside, and to preserve his spirit rather than his relics.

== Legacy ==
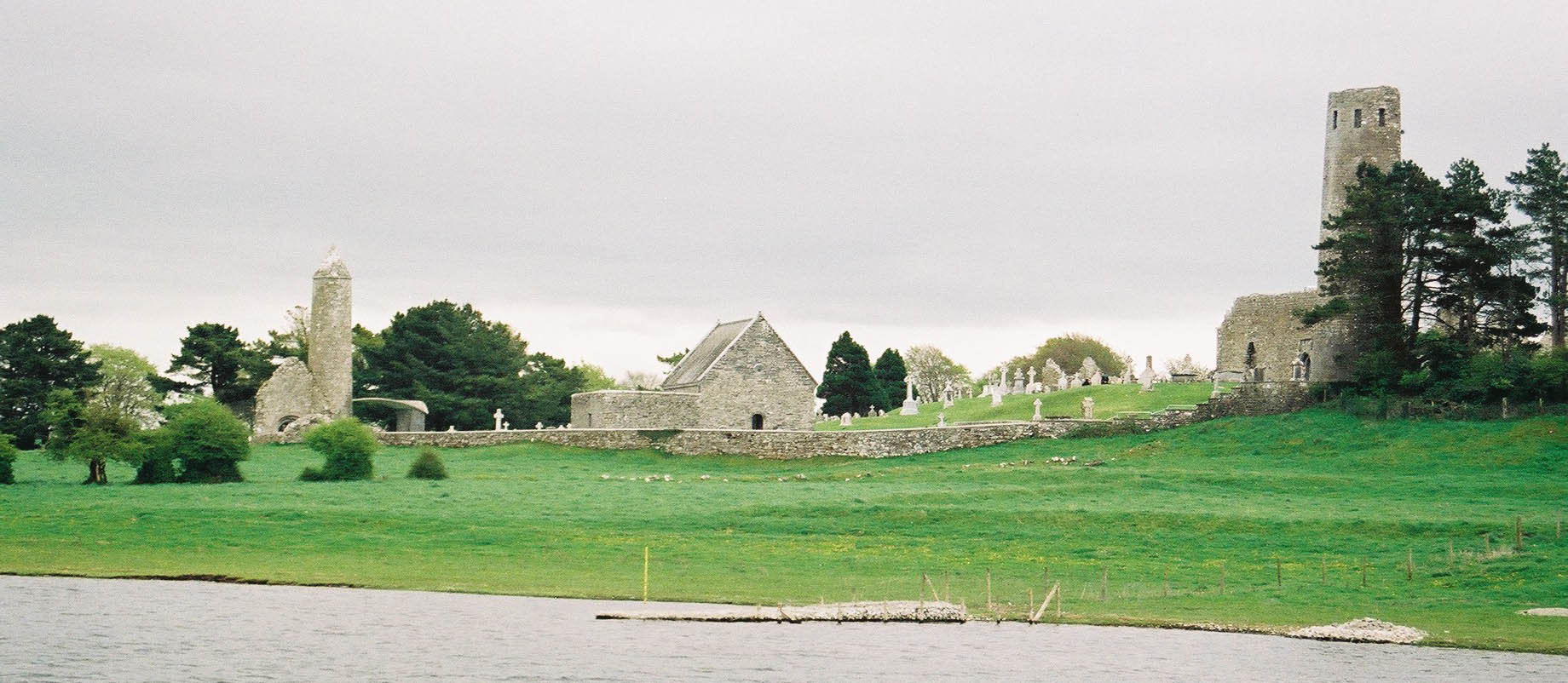
Clonmacnoise viewed from river

The monastery at Clonmacnoise became one of the most important centres of learning and religious life in Ireland. Unusually, the title of abbot – which included the title "Comarba of Saint Ciarán" – at the community was not hereditary, which reflected the humble origins of its founder. It managed to survive the plunderings of the Viking raids and the Anglo-Norman wars, and was only destroyed during the Dissolution of the Monasteries, in 1552. The ruins still exist, and remain a centre of civic and religious activity to this day.

The treasures of Ciarán's shrine were dispersed throughout the Medieval era; although the Clonmacnoise Crozier still exists and is stored in the National Museum of Ireland.

The Celtic scholar Charles Plummer suggested that Ciaran of Clonmacnoise was the patron saint of Cornwall Saint Piran challenging the broadly accepted belief that he was Ciaran of Saigir. The difference in spelling is for dialect or linguistical reasons between the two Insular Celtic languages. Brytonic was categorized as P-Celtic, as it replaced the harder ‘c’ or k sound in the Goidelic languages with the softer letter ‘p’. On the other hand, Goidelic was seen by scholars as being Q-Celtic, as the earliest Ogham inscriptions used a 'Q' transcribed by Queirt, which represented the Apple Tree to phonetically pronounce the k sound, although Q was later replaced by the letter 'C' in the Old Irish alphabet.

Saint Ciarán of Clonmacnoise has a strong connection with Campbeltown, Argyll and Bute in Scotland. Campbeltown was formerly known as Ceann Loch Chille Chiarain which means "head of the loch by the kirk of Ciarán" Pilgrims frequently take place were tourists visit a cave associated with the Saint near Island Davaar. The Saint is believed to have lived for a time in an area that would later become known as Campbeltown at the same time as the legendary king Fergus Mór was establishing the kingdom of the Scottish Dál Riata, after invading Argyll from Ireland.

== See also ==
- Ciarán of Saigir
- Saint Cera
- Early Irish Christianity
- Maolán
