= St. Eunan's Cathedral =

St Eunan's Cathedral (/ˈjuːnən/ YOO-nən) may refer to:

- The Roman Catholic Cathedral of St Eunan and St Columba in Letterkenny, County Donegal, Ireland.
- The Anglican St Eunan's Cathedral, Raphoe in Donegal

== See also ==
- Saint Eunan (disambiguation)
