= St. Columba's School =

St. Columba's School may refer to:

== Australia ==
- St. Columba's Primary School, Wilston, Queensland

== India ==
- St. Columba's School, Delhi

== Malaysia ==
- SMK St. Columba, Miri
- SK St Columba, Miri

== United Kingdom ==
- St Columba's Catholic Boys' School, London, England
- St Columba's School, Kilmacolm, Renfrewshire, Scotland

== United States ==
- St. Columba's School (Schenectady, New York), listed on the National Register of Historic Places

== See also ==
- St Columba's College (disambiguation)
