= Gartan =

Gartan Gartán
- Civil parish
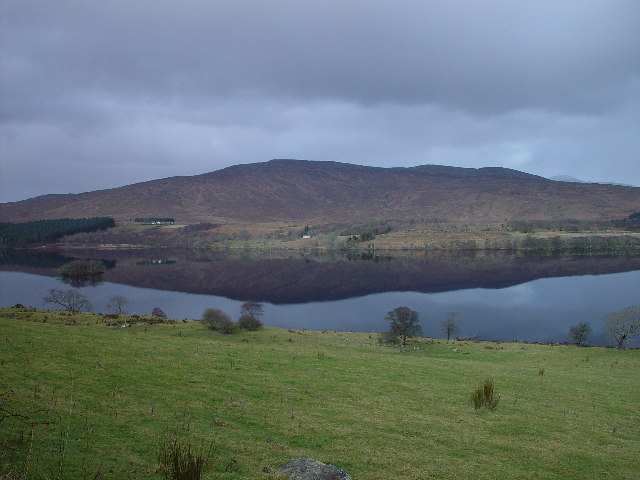
- Gartan Lough

- Location in Ireland
- Coordinates: 55°01′47″N 7°46′43″W
- Country: Ireland
- Province: Ulster
- County: County Donegal

Government
  - Dáil Éireann: Donegal
- Time zone: UTC+0 (WET)
  - Summer (DST): UTC-1 (IST (WEST))
- Irish Grid Reference: B847228

Gartan (Irish: Gartán) is a civil parish and townland in County Donegal, Ireland. The area is best known for being the birthplace of Columba, one of the three patron saints of Ireland and one of the most revered saints in the Christian world. Here he founded a monastery in 521. The popular song "Gartan Mother's Lullaby" comes from the area, and has been performed by many artists, including American actress Meryl Streep.

From the book Kenny, by Leona Dalrymple (The Reilly & Britton Co., Chicago, 1917):

I often think these days of Kenny's wood-fire tales of the shrine of
Black Gartan where St. Columba was born. Colomcille, old Kenny called
him around the wood-fire, didn't he? Colomcille, Kenny said, having
been in exile, knew the homesick pangs himself and therefore could give
the good Irishmen who journeyed to his shrine strength to bear them.
I'm not in exile but there are times when I should be journeyin' off,
as Kenny says when the brogue is on him, to Black Gartan. The curse of
the Celt! Kenny swears there's no homesickness in the world like an
Irishman's passionate longing for home and kin. Not that I long for
the studio. God forbid! Kenny's the symbol for it all.

== Gallery ==
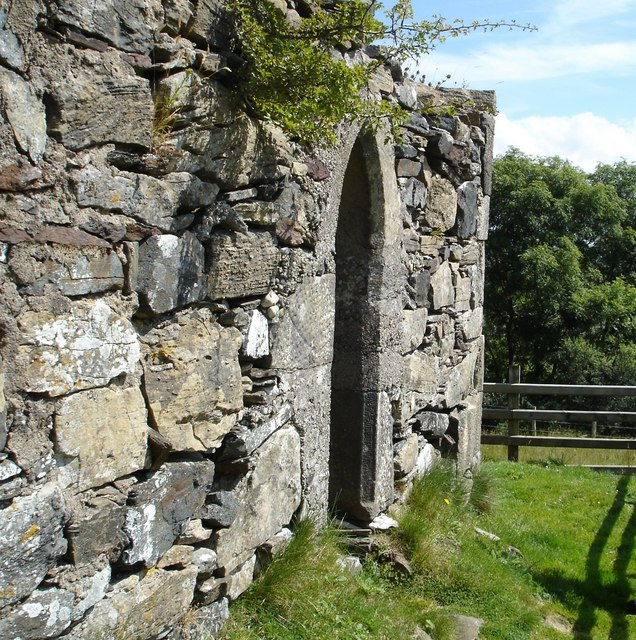
The remains of St. Columba's church.

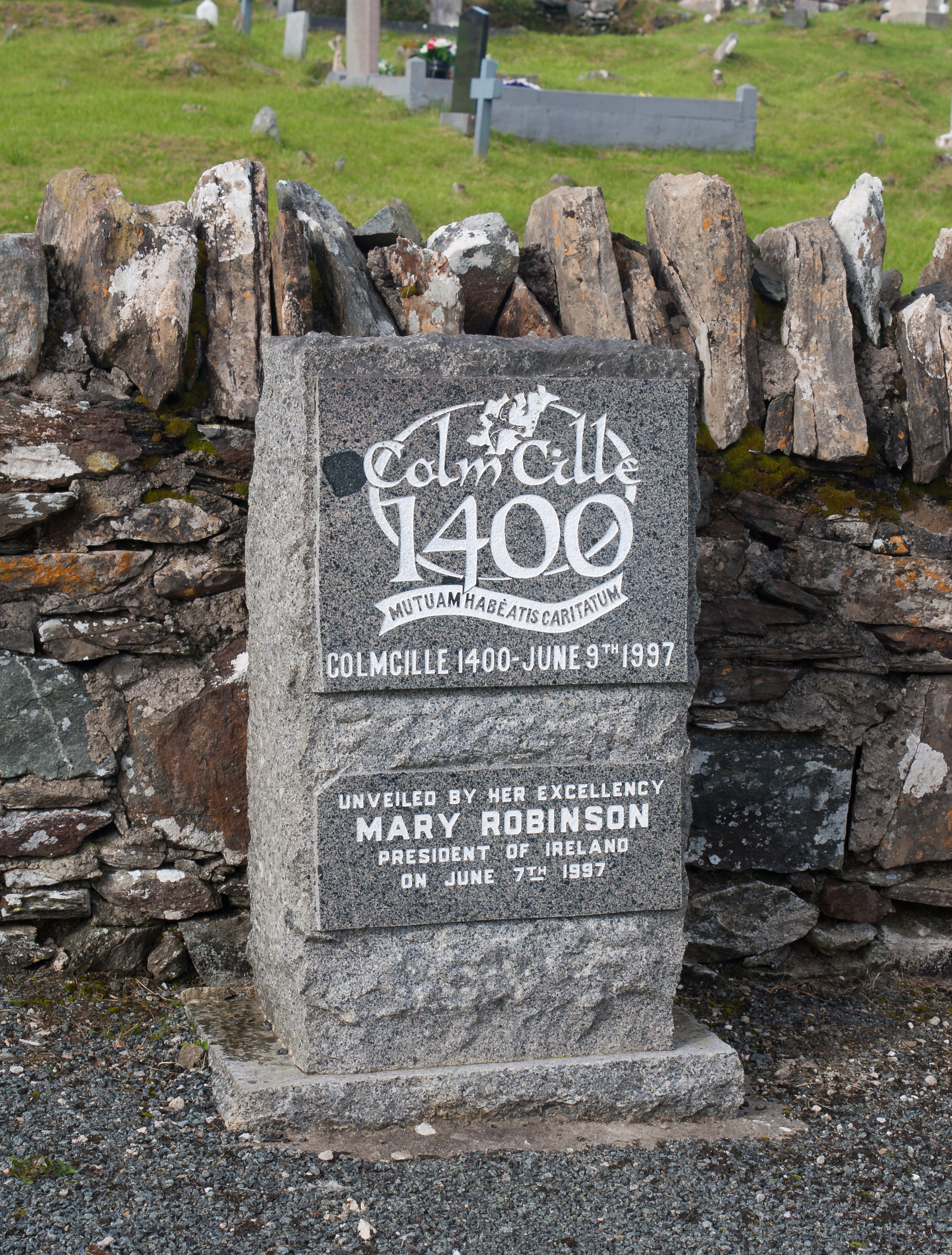
Memorial plaque unveiled by Mary Robinson on the occasion of the 1400th anniversary of the death of Colm Cille
