= Finnian of Clonard =

Irish saint

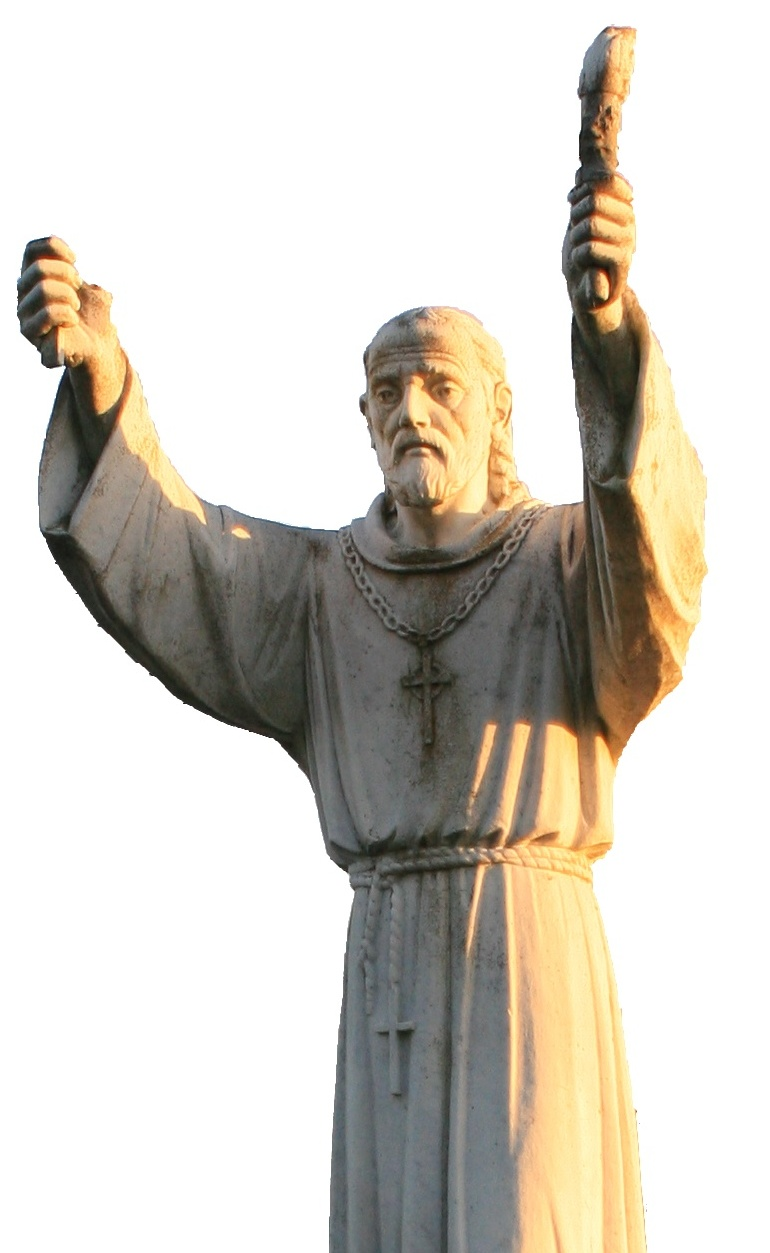
- Statue of St. Finnian in Clonard

Teacher of the Saints of Ireland
- Born: 470; Myshall, Kingdom of Leinster, Gaelic Ireland
- Died: 12 December 549; Ross Findchuill, Kingdom of Meath, Gaelic Ireland
- Venerated in: Catholic Church, Eastern Orthodox Church
- Major shrine: Clonard Abbey (destroyed)
- Feast: 12 December
- Patronage: Diocese of Meath

Finnian of Clonard ('Cluain Eraird') – also Finian, Fionán or Fionnán in Irish; or Finianus and Finanus in its Latinised form (470–549) – was one of the early Irish monastic saints, who founded Clonard Abbey in modern-day County Meath. The Twelve Apostles of Ireland studied under him. Finnian of Clonard, (along with Enda of Aran) is considered one of the fathers of Irish monasticism.

== Early life ==
Finnian was born at the Kingdom of Leinster, son of Findlog. His birthplace is generally supposed to have been near the present town of New Ross. He was a member of Clanna Rudhraighe from the Ulaid. Abban baptised Finnian, and at an early age, he was placed under the care of Bishop Fortchern of Trim.

According to some sources, Finnian studied for a time at the monastic centre of Martin of Tours in Gaul. Tours was noted for its austerity. He later went to Wales and continued his studies at the monastery of Cadoc the Wise, at Llancarfan (whose place-name translates as 'the Llan of the stags') in Glamorgan. He remained there for years, at prayer and study. Finnian made copies of Rome's classics and of St. Jerome's Vulgate.

After a sojourn in Wales of thirty years, according to the Codex Salmanticensis, he returned to his native land. Although, as Hickey (1996, p. 9) notes, "Thirty years away from Ireland seems too long when we consider Finnian's achievements in Ireland".

== Foundations ==
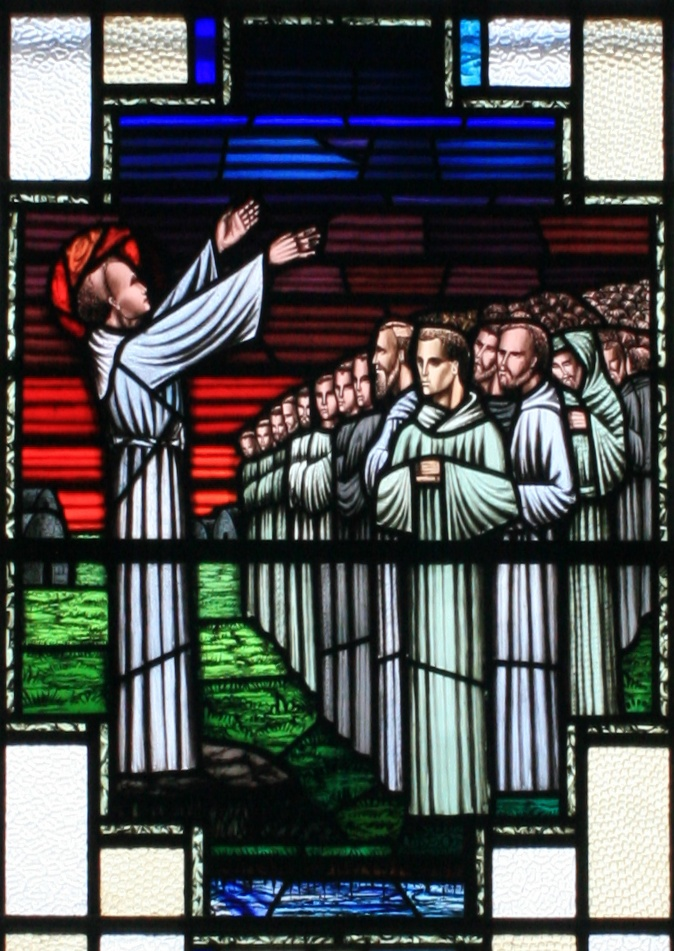
Finnian and his pupils in a stained glass window at the Church of St. Finian in Clonard

Finnian came first to Aghowle in County Wicklow at the foot of Sliabh Condala, where Oengus, the king of Leinster granted him a site. He then founded a monastic community on Skellig Michael, off the coast of Kerry, 'though this is doubted by historians. From there, he went to Brigid's monastery at Kildare. Around 520, he was at last led by an angel to Cluain Eraird (Clonard, County Meath) on the River Boyne, which he was told would be the place of his resurrection.

At Clonard, Finnian built a little cell and a church of clay and wattle, and entered on a life of study, mortification, and prayer. The fame of his learning and sanctity soon spread, and scholars of all ages flocked from every side to his monastic retreat. Finnian established a monastery modelled on the practices of Welsh monasteries, and based on the traditions of the Desert Fathers and the study of Scripture. The rule of Clonard was known for its strictness and asceticism. The pupils of Finnian who became the founding fathers of monasteries are described as leaving Clonard bearing a book or crozier or some other object, suggesting that a working scriptorium and craft workshops were established at Clonard at an early date.

The Penitential of Finnian prescribes penances with a view to correcting sinful tendencies and cultivating the contrary virtue. The document shows wide learning and draws on the teaching of John Cassian on overcoming the eight evil tendencies – gluttony, fornication, covetousness, anger, dejection, accidie (laziness), vainglory and pride (The Institutes, Books 5–12).

== Later life and death ==
In the Office of St. Finnian, it is stated that there were no fewer than 3,000 pupils getting instruction at one time in the school in the green fields of Clonard. The master excelled in exposition of the Sacred Scriptures, and to this fact must be mainly attributed the extraordinary popularity which his lectures enjoyed. Finnian's gift for teaching and his absolute dedication to the ascetic ideal inspired a whole generation. Clonard drew students from various parts of Europe. Ciarán of Clonmacnoise and Columcille of Iona are among the many who trained under him. They and many others took seeds of knowledge from Finnian's monastery at Clonard and planted them abroad with great success. Finnian died of the plague in 549. Hickey (1996) says: "If we consider his achievements in life, rather than the fabulous age attributed to him by his biographer (140 years), we may guess his age at death as perhaps sixty or sixty-five." His burial-place is in his own church of Clonard.

Finnian's sister, Regnach, was Abbess of Kilreynagh, near the present town of Banagher.

== Veneration ==
Clonard became an important school because of the number of its students who went on to found other monasteries. For centuries after his death, the school continued to be renowned as a seat of Scriptural learning. The relics of Finnian himself were enshrined at Clonard until 887, after which the shrine was destroyed. In the eleventh century the school suffered at the hands of the Danes, especially by two Irishmen O'Rorke of Breifney and Dermod McMurrough. With the transference by the Norman Bishop of Rochfort, in 1206, of the See of Meath from Clonard to Trim, the glory of the former place departed forever.

Finnian of Clonard's feast-day is 12 December, which is first attested in a Spanish Martyrology of the 9th century. In later years the monastery of Clonard came under the rule of the Uí Néill, and came to share an abbot with either Kildare or Clonmacnoise.

=== Patronage ===
Finnian is the patron saint of the Diocese of Meath.

== See also ==
- Saint Finnian of Clonard, patron saint archive
