= Clonard Abbey =

Early medieval monastery in Meath, Ireland

Coordinates: 53°27′02″N 7°00′26″W

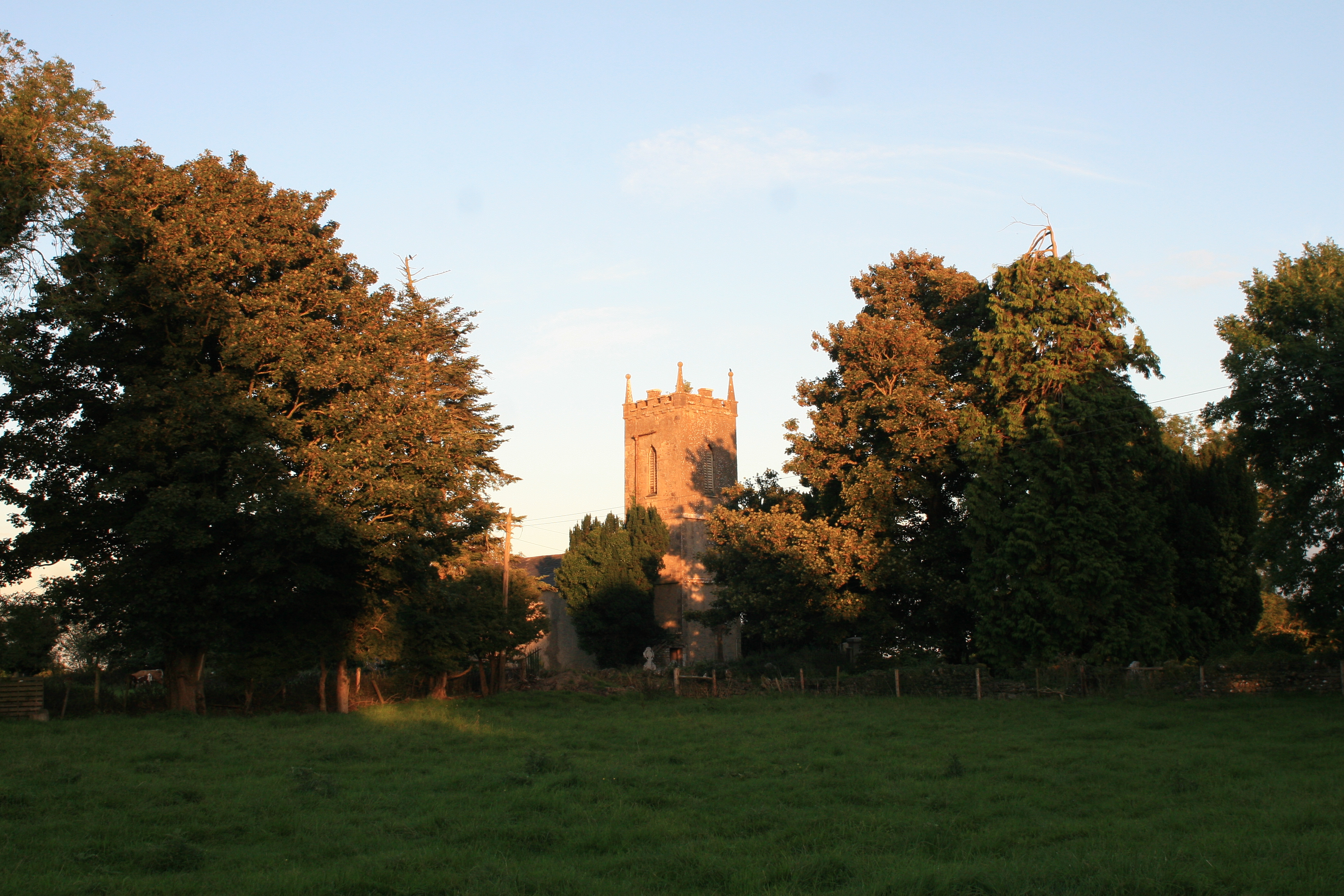
Disused Anglican church at the monastic site of Clonard

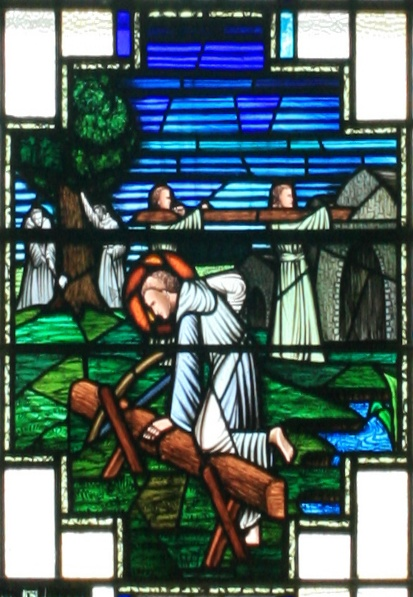
The construction of the monastery in a stained glass window of the church of St. Finian in Clonard

Clonard Abbey (Irish: Mainistir Chluain Ioraird, meaning "Erard's Meadow") was an early medieval monastery situated on the River Boyne in Clonard, County Meath, Ireland.

== Early history ==
The monastery was founded in about 520 by Saint Finnian, who initially constructed a single cell at the site. The original site may have been at nearby Ard Relec. According to medieval chronicles, Finnian was led to the site by an angel who told him that it would be the place of his resurrection. He was well-travelled, and based his monastery on the training he received at Tours and Llancarfan. Finnian was buried on the site after his death in about 549. During the sixth century, some of the most significant names in the history of Irish Christianity (who would go on to be known as the Twelve Apostles of Ireland) studied at the monastery.

Clonard was situated on the Esker Riada, Ireland's main east-west road in early medieval times, adding to its prominence. However, it was also on the boundary between the kingdoms of Leinster and Meath that were occasionally at war.

From the eighth century onwards, Clonard came under the control of various rival political dynasties, and by the mid-ninth century, it was the leading church of the Irish midlands. The abbot of Clonard led the clergy of the midlands in the same fashion that the abbot of Armagh led those in the north. During its heyday, a hymn written in Finnian's honour claimed that the monastery's school housed 3,000 pupils receiving religious instruction at any given time.

A great part of the abbey erected by St. Finian was burnt in 764. Like many monastic sites in Ireland, Clonard suffered heavy losses under the Viking raids of the ninth through eleventh centuries. In the year 838 the Danes destroyed it and put the clergy to the sword. They returned again in 888. In 939, Ceallachan, King of Cashel, assisted by the Danes of Waterford, plundered the abbey. In 970, Donell, son of Murcha, pillaged and burnt Clonard.

== As a diocese ==
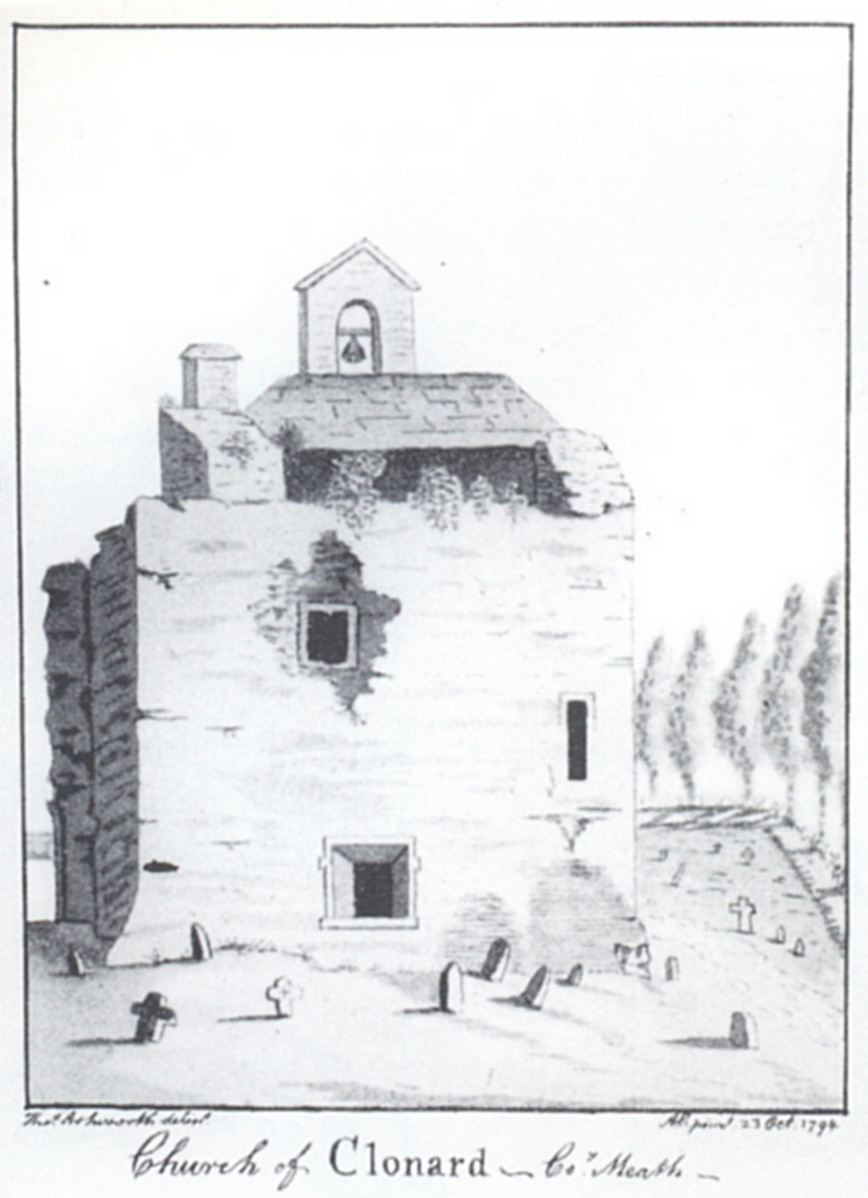
Clonard Abbey Ruins, sketched by Austin Cooper, 1794

From the Synod of Ráth Breasail (1111), it was the centre of the new see of Clonard, to which, were added the bishoprics of Trim, Ardbraccan, Dunshaughlin, and Slane, indicating its importance at the time. This was confirmed at the Synod of Kells in 1152. In 1113, Connor, King of Munster, plundered Meath and forcibly carried off the riches of the whole province, which had been lodged for safety in the abbey church. A great part of the abbey, and all the library, was consumed by an accidental fire in 1143. The abbey and town were despoiled and burnt in 1170, by M'Murcha, aided by Earl Strongbow and the English, and having been afterwards rebuilt, they suffered a similar fate in the year 1175. That same year, Walter, son of Hugh de Lacy, erected, probably on the ruins of the ancient abbey, an Augustinian monastery. Clonard fell into decline during the twelfth century, and in 1202, the Norman bishop de Rochfort transferred the see from Clonard to Trim in the new Diocese of Meath.

Very little remains of the site today. From the air, the outlines of some wall boundaries and other earthworks are visible.

== Annalistic references ==
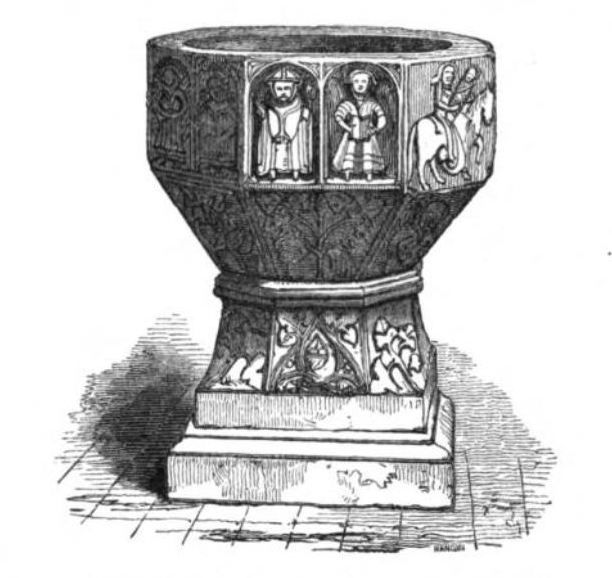
Clonard's Baptismal Font, sketched by William Wilde in 1849, now installed at the Church of St. Finian, Clonard

See Annals of Inisfallen (AI)

- AI748a Kl. Repose of Mo-Dímóc of Cluain Iraird.
- AI870.1 Kl. Repose of Suairlech of In tEidnén, abbot of Cluain Iraird.
- AI926.1 Kl. Repose of Colmán son of Ailill abbot of Cluain Moccu Nóis and Cluain Iraird.
- AI954.2 Repose of Dub Inse, learned bishop of Ireland, and of Cellachán, king of Caisel, and of Éladach the learned, abbot of Ros Ailithir, and of Uarach, bishop of Imlech Ibuir, and of Célechair, abbot of Cluain Moccu Nóis and Cluain Iraird, and of Cormac Ua Maíl Shluaig, learned sage of Mumu, and of Lugaid Ua Maíl Shempail, abbot of Domnach Pátraic, and of Cenn Faelad son of Suibne, anchorite of Cluain Ferta Brénainn.

== See also ==
- List of abbeys and priories in County Meath
