= List of saints of Ireland =

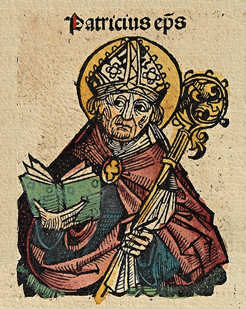
Saint Patrick, woodcut from the Nuremberg Chronicle

In Christianity, certain deceased Christians are recognized as saints, including some from Ireland. The vast majority of these saints lived during the 4th–10th centuries, the period of early Christian Ireland, when Celtic Christianity produced many missionaries to Great Britain and the European continent. The exact number of Irish saints is not known but the Martyrology of Donegal lists 1000 saints, male and female. For this reason, Ireland in a 19th-century adage is described as "the land of saints and scholars".

Christianity was introduced into Ireland toward the end of the 4th century. The details of the introduction are obscure, though the strict ascetic nature of monasticism in Ireland is said to be derived from the practices of the Desert Fathers. Although there were some Christians in Ireland before Patrick, who was a native of Roman Britain, he played a significant role in its full Christianisation.

Some of the best-known saints are Saint Patrick, Colmcill, Brigid of Kildare and the Twelve Apostles of Ireland.

After 1000, the process of recognizing saints was formalized, after which fewer people were named saints. Those canonized in the modern era include Oliver Plunkett (d. 1681, canonized 1975 by Pope Paul VI) and Charles of Mount Argus (d. 1893, canonized in 2007 by Pope Benedict XVI).

== Veneration ==
The medieval Irish saints were venerated locally in the areas in which they lived or established churches. With the Viking invasions, Irish churches were frequently ransacked and saints' relics and shrines were often destroyed.

== Early saints ==
| Name | Floruit | Origin | Associated church | Notes | Feast day | Ref | Image |
|---|---|---|---|---|---|---|---|
| Abbán moccu Corbmaic | 5th–6th centuries (d. 520?) | Leinster, Ireland | Adamstown (Mag Arnaide), County Wexford; Killabban (Cell Abbáin), County Laois | Leinster and Munster saint | 16 March or 27 October | | |
| Abel of Reims | 8th century | Ireland? | | Bishop of Reims; Irish origins are questionable | 5 August (Bollandists) | | |
| Abran | 5th–6th centuries (d. 515) | Ireland | | Sailed to Brittany with siblings, lived as hermit by Marne River | 8 May | | |
| Adalgis of Thiérache | 7th century (d. 686) | Ireland | Saint-Algis Church | Worked as a missionary in Arras and Laon, was a disciple of Fursey. | 2 June | | |
| Adomnán | 7th century (d. 704) | Ireland | Iona | Abbot of Iona, politically active churchman, writer; promulgated the Cáin Adomnáin | 23 September | | |
| Adomnán of Coldingham | 7th century (d. 680) | Ireland | | Confessor, prophet, monk at Coldingham, noted for the gift of prophecy | | | |
| Áed mac Bricc | 6th century | Irish, of the Cenél Fiachach | Rahugh and Killare, County Westmeath, and Slieve League, County Donegal | Meath saint | 10 November | | |
| Áed of Clonmore | 7th century (d. 659?) | Irish, of the Uí Dúnlainge dynasty, north Leinster | Clonmore (Cluain Mór Máedóc), County Carlow | Leinster saint | 11 April | | |
| Aedan of Ferns, see Máedóc of Ferns | | | | | | | |
| Aidan of Lindisfarne | 7th century (d. 651) | Connacht, Ireland | Lindisfarne | First Bishop of Lindisfarne, invited by king Oswald to reconvert Northumbria | 31 August | | |
| Ailbe of Emly | 6th century (d. 534?) | Munster, Ireland | Emly | First Bishop of Emly | 12 September | | |
| Ailerán | 7th century (d. 665) | Ireland | Clonard | Scholar at Clonard. | | | |
| Alto of Altomünster | 8th century | Ireland | Altomünster | Founder of Altomünster, missionary to Bavaria, hermit and Benedictine | | | |
| Andrew the Scot | 9th century | Ireland | Fiesole, Tuscany | Archdeacon at Fiesole in Tuscany, studied under Donatus, gave to the poor | | | |
| Assicus (Tassach) | 5th century | Ireland | Elphin | Ulster saint, first Bishop of Elphin, converted by Patrick, smith and bellfounder to Patrick | 27 April | | |
| Athracht | 5th–6th centuries | Ireland | Killaraght and Toberaraght | Connacht saint, nun under Patrick and associated with Killaraght and Toberaraght, founded a hostel at Lough Gara | 11 August | | |
| Autbod | 7th century | Ireland | Valcourt | Missionary and patron of Valcourt, known for miraculous fever cure | | | |
| Baíthéne | 6th century (d. 598) | Ireland | Iona; Mag Lunge | Abbot of Iona and disciple of Columba; earlier abbot of Mag Lunge on Tiree | | | |
| Balin | 7th century | Northumbria | | Gerald of Mayo's brother, disciple of Colmán, resided in Connacht | | | |
| Balthere | 8th century (d. 756) | Ireland | | Hermit and priest, moved to Lindisfarne, known as Apostle of the Lothians | | | |
| Barinthus | 6th century | Ulster, Ireland or Scotland | | Supposed companion of St. Brendan who may also have had a connection to St. Finbarr | | | |
| Barrfoin | 6th century | Ireland | Drum Cullen, County Offaly | Missionary at Drum Cullen, friend of Columba, joined voyage of Brendan | | | |
| Banban the Wise | 5th century | Ireland | Templeport, County Cavan | Missionary at Templeport, related to Saint Patrick | | | |
| Bécán | 6th century | Ireland | Kilbeggan, County Westmeath | Founder of Kilbeggan, Westmeath, worked in a monastery there | | | |
| Bega | | Ireland | | Princess, valued virginity, moved to Northumbria to avoid pirates | | | |
| Benignus of Armagh | 5th century | Meath, Ireland | | Patrick's psalm-singer, favourite disciple, helped compile Senchus Mór | | | |
| Béoáed mac Ocláin | 6th century (d. 520/4) | Connacht, Ireland | Ardcarne (Ard Carna) | Bishop of Ardcarne | 7 March or 8 March | | |
| Beoán of Ard Camrois, Mo Bheóc | ? | Ireland | Ard Camrois/Ard Cáinrois, Munster; Ros Caín, Connacht | Munster and Connacht saint | 16 December | | |
| Beóán of Mortlach | 11th century (fl. 1012 x 1024) | "possibly of Irish origin" | Mortlach | Bishop of Mortlach, Scotland | 16 December, possibly owing to confusion with the previous saint | | |
| Beoc | 5th century | Ireland | Lough Derg, County Donegal | Founded St Patrick's Purgatory monastery at Lough Derg, Donegal | | | |
| Berach | 6th–7th centuries | Connacht, Ireland | Tarmonbarry; Cluain Coirpthe | Founder of Tarmonbarry and Cluain Coirpthe, disciple of Kevin and nephew of Freoch, belonged to the Cenél nDobtha of the Uí Briúin | 15 February | | |
| Berchert | 7th-8th centuries | England | Tullylease, County Cork St Berrihert's Kyle, County Tipperary | An exile of the "Celtic party" following the victory of the "Roman party" at the Synod of Whitby, 664. | 6 December | | |
| Blathmac | 8th–9th centuries (d. 823) | Ireland | Iona | Abbot of Iona, martyred by Danish Vikings, killed on altar steps of the abbey at Iona | | | |
| Blath of Kildare | 6th century | Irish | Kildare town, Co. Kildare | A virgin saint, one of the companions of St. Brigid. She was a cook in the convent of St. Brigid at Kildare. | 29 January | | |
| Boadin | | Ireland | | Monk, moved to France, known for kindness and living the Rule of Benedict | | | |
| Boethian of Pierrepoint | 7th century | Ireland | Pierrepoint (France) | Founder of Pierrepoint (France), disciple of Fursey, martyred by rebellious monks | | | |
| Brandan | 5th century | Ireland | | Monk, fought Pelagianism in Britain, Abbot in Gaul after fleeing | | | |
| Breage | 5th century | Ireland | | Nun, follower of Brigid of Kildare, settled by River Hayle, Dumnonia | | | |
| Brendan of Clonfert | 5th–6th centuries | Tralee, Ireland | Clonfert | Founder of Clonfert, monk, and remembered as a voyager to mysterious islands | 16 May | | |
| Brendan mac Nemainn | 6th century | Irish | Birr, County Offaly | Meath saint; founder of Birr; contemporary of the younger Brendan of Clonfert; came to be regarded as one of the "Twelve Apostles of Ireland" | 29 November | | |
| Briarch | 7th century (d. 627) | Ireland | | Abbot and founder of monastery in Brittany. Closely associated with Tudwal | | | |
| Brianhuil/Brenhilda | 7th century | Ireland | Sula Sgeir, Scotland | The sister of St. Ronan of Iona, who lived as a hermitess and died on Sula Sgeir | ? | | |
| Brigit | 5th century | Ireland | Cluain Fidhe or Inis Fidhe (Finish/Feenish Island, Co. Clare) | A virgin saint and an abbess associated with Finish Island who was mentioned in the life of St. Senan of Inis Cathaig. | | | |
| Brigit of Kildare | 5th–6th centuries | Irish, of the Fothairt. Born in Faughart, Dundalk | Kildare | Leinster, Louth, and Meath saint, also a patron saint of Ireland, founder and patron of Kildare | 1 February | | |
| Bricín or Bricíne | 7th century | Ireland | Tomregan (Túaim Dreccon), County Cavan | Abbot of Túaim Dreccon | | | |
| Broccán Clóen | 7th century | Ireland | Ross Tuirc | Abbot of Ross Tuirc, Ossory, author of a hymn to St Brigit | | | |
| Broccán/Brychan | 5th century | Ireland | Brycheiniog, Wales | An Irish king or chieftain who travelled to Wales, settling in Brecknock, where he had some 24 children, all saints. | 6 April | | |
| Brón mac Icni | 5th–6th centuries (d. 512) | Connacht, Ireland | Caisel Irrae | Bishop of Cassel-lrra (Caisel Irrae), disciple and bishop of St Patrick | 8 June | | |
| Brónach | 5th–6th centuries (d. 512) | Ulster, Ireland | Kilbroney (Cell Brónche) | Ulster saint; her church was Cell Brónche (Kilbroney), later the parish church of Glen Seichis | 2 April | | |
| Budoc | 6th century | at sea, off Brest | Dol, Brittany | Bishop of Dol, prince, fled to Ireland following exile from his mother's kingdom | | | |
| Buíte [Boetius] mac Brónaig | 5th–6th centuries (d. 519/20) | | Monasterboice (Mainister Buíte) | Meath Saint, patron of Monasterboice | 7 December | | |
| Buriana | 6th century | Ireland | St Buryan | Hermitess, known for holiness at Dumnonia, venerated at St Buryan | | | |
| Cael | | Irish | Kilmainham, Dublin, and Killiney | She was a virgin and called the daughter of Maclaar. | 26 October | | |
| Caillín [Caillén] mac Niataig | 6th century? | Irish | Fenagh, County Leitrim | | 13 November | | |
| Caimín | 7th century (d. 644?) | | Inis Celtra (Holy Island on Lough Derg) | Munster saint | 25 March | | |
| Cainneach | | Irish | Achad Raithin (Munster) | A brother of St. Laidgenn and St. Accobran | 28 November | | |
| Cainneach moccu Dálann | 6th century (521/7 – 599/600) | | Aghaboe (Achad Bó Chainnig); Kilkenny (Cill Chainnig) | Munster saint, founder and first abbot Aghaboe and Kilkenny in Osraige | 11 October | | |
| Cainnear | 6th century | Irish | Cluain Clairaid (unknown) | A virgin saint and an abbess, called the daughter of Fintan. She was healed of muteness by her first cousin St. Brendan | 6 November | | |
| Cainnear | 6th century | Irish | Rinn hAllaidh (unknown) | A virgin saint, the daughter of Caelan | 5 November | | |
| Cainnear | 6th century | Irish | Cluain da Saileach (Clonsilla, Dublin) | The mother of St. Crónán Mochua of Clondalkin and six other bishop saints. | 6 August | | |
| Cainnear | 6th century (d. 530) | Irish | Inis Cathaig and Bantry, Co. Cork | The daughter of Cruithnechan, a virgin and a recluse, the stepsister of St. Senan of Inis Cathaig | 28 January | | Saint Cainnear (Cannera or Conaire) of Bantry |
| Cainer (Cainnear) | ? | Irish | Léthraith (?) | The daughter of Fergnai mc Fhergusa. She was mentioned in the Book of Leinster as the sister of three other female saints named Fuin, Delbnait and Deimlir. | ? | | |
| Cainer (Cainnear) | ? | Irish | Cluain Corind (?) | The daughter of Airmind. Obscure saint mentioned in Book of Leinster | ? | | |
| Cairech Dergain | 6th century (d. 577/9) | | | Connacht saint | 9 February | | |
| Cairnech of Dulane | 5th–6th centuries | British (probable) | Dulane (Tulén or Tuilián), County Meath | Meath saint, who has been identified with Saint Carannog (Carantocus) | 16 May | | |
| Camulacus | 5th century? | British (probably) | Rahan | Meath saint whose status as patron saint of Rahan was later eclipsed by that of Mo Chutu | 16 May if he is identical to Mo Chamal | | |
| Cassan/Cascan | | Irish | Kilcaskan, Co. Cork (Munster) | He was called the son of Maenach and was a brother of St. Fachnan of Ross. | 17 Jun | | |
| Caomhán (Cavan, Kevin) | 6th century | | Inisheer | | 14 June | | |
| Caoimhe/Caomhsa | ? | Irish | Tamhlacht (either in Co. Down or in Co. Dublin) | A virgin saint | 25 February | | |
| Caoimhe/Caemh/Coine | ? | Irish (or Scottish?) | Cill Chaoimhe (possibly Kilkine in Co. Wicklow) | A virgin saint believed to be related to Saint Kevin. She is associated with Kilkine in Wicklow, though she is also stated to have been Scottish. | 4 April | | |
| Caolán/Caelán (or Mochaoi) | 5th century | Irish | Nendrum Island | The son of St. Bronagh and a friend of St. Patrick. He was the abbot-bishop of Nendrum Island, Co. Down | 23 June | | |
| Caolán/Caelán | 6th/7th century | Irish | Tigh-na-Manach (Tinnahinch, Co. Kilkenny) | A monk and founder of a monastery at Tinnahinch | 29 October | | |
| Carthach mac Fianáin | 6th century, late | | | Munster saint | 5 March | | |
| Catan | 6th century | Ireland or Dal Riata | Kilchattan on the Isle of Bute, Bishop of Bute | Irish missionary to Dal Riata and the Picts. One of his servant's and their families may have given rise to the Clan Chattan Federation | 17 May | | |
| Cellach of Armagh | 11th–12th centuries (d. 1129) | | | Archbishop of Armagh | | | |
| Cellach of Glendalough | 5th/6th century | Irish | Disert-Cellaig (near Glendalough, Co. Wicklow) | A disciple of St. Kevin who became a hermit near Glendalough | 7 October | | |
| Céthech (Caetiacus, Cethiachus) | 5th century | | | Connacht saint | 16 June | | |
| Cianán mac Sétnai | 5th century (d. 489) | Irish, of the Ciannachta? | Duleek, County Meath | Meath saint, patron of Duleek | 24 November | | |
| Ciarán mac int Shaír | 6th century | Irish, of the Cruithne of Latharnae | Clonmacnoise (Cluain Moccu Nois); Inis Aingin | Meath saint | 9 September | | |
| Ciarán of Saigir | 5th century (400–500) | Of the Dal Birn of Ossory, raised in Cape Clear Island | Saighir | Kingdom of Ossory saint | 5 March | | |
| Cobba/Coppa | | Irish | | A virgin saint called the daughter of Baedan. | 18 January | | |
| Cobba/Coppa | ? | Irish | ? | A female saint called the 'daughter of Dioma' | 28 April | | |
| Cóemgen (Kevin) | 6th–7th century (d. 618) | | Glendalough, County Wicklow | Leinster saint, known as the founder of Glendalough (Co. Wicklow) | 3 June | | |
| Colcu ua Duinechda | 8th century (d. 796) | Irish | Clonmacnoise (Cluain Moccu Nois) | Meath saint, scribá, probably bishop of Clonmacnoise | 20 February | | |
| Colman Isirni (Colman the Thirsty) | 5th century | Irish | Interred at Armagh Cathedral | A young monk who died of dehydration while fasting. Considered a martyr. | 5 March | | |
| Colmán mac Léníne | 6th century (530–606) | | Cloyne (Cluain Uama) | Munster saint, patron of Cloyne | 24 November | | |
| Colman of Dromore | 6th Century | Irish | Diocese of Dromore | Patron & Bishop of Dromore | 7 June | | |
| Coirpre Crom mac Feradaig | 9th century (d. 904) | Irish | Clonmacnoise (Cluain Moccu Nois) | Meath saint, bishop of Clonmacnoise | 6 March | | |
| Colman of Templeshambo | 6th century (died c.595) | Irish, from Connacht | none | Abbot of Templeshambo | 27 October | | |
| Colmán Elo | 6th–7th centuries (d. 611) | Irish, from an Ulster people | Lynally (Lann Elo), County Westmeath; Connor | Meath Saint | 26 September | | |
| Colmán mac Luacháin | 7th century | | Lynn (Lann), County Westmeath | Meath saint | | | |
| Colum mac Crimthainn | 6th century (d. 549) | Irish, of the Leinster Uí Chremthannáin | Terryglass (Tír Dá Glass); Inis Celtra | Munster saint, said to have died of plague | 13 December | | |
| Columba (Colmcille) | 7th Dec 521 to 9 June 597 | Gartan, Donegal, Ireland | Iona, various in Donegal | Abbot of Iona | 9 June | | |
| Columbanus | 543 – 23 November 615 | Leinster, Kingdom of Meath Ireland | Various places in Europe | Abbot of Luxeuil, France and Bobbio, Italy | 25 November | | |
| Comgall mac Sétnai | 6th century (511/16–602) | | | Ulster saint | 10 May | | |
| Comgán mac Dá Cherda | 7th century (d. 645) | | | Munster saint | | | |
| Commán mac Fáelchon, Mo Chommóc | 8th century (d. 747) | south of Roscommon, among the Sogain | Roscommon | Connacht saint, patron saint of Roscommon | 26 December | | |
| Comnait (Comnaid, Connaid) | 6th century (d. 590 AD) | Irish | Kildare | A virgin saint and an abbess of St. Brigid's convent at Kildare | 1 January | | |
| Conna | ? | Irish | ? | A virgin saint listed in the Martyrology of Donegal | 3 March | | |
| Conac (Cainneach) | ? | | Ard-Conaing (unknown) | A virgin saint listed in Martyrology of Donegal | 25 October | | |
| Constant | 8th century (d.777) | | | | 18 November | | |
| Cu'Mhaighe (Cooey of Portaferry) | 7th century | Irish | Founder of the parish church of Witter, Templecooey, County Down | Patron saint of three holy wells near Portaferry. | | | |
| Cormac mac Eogain | 6th century | | | Connacht saint | | | |
| Cormac ua Liatháin | 6th century | Irish, of the Uí Liatháin | Durrow (probable resting place) | Meath Saint | 21 June | | |
| Cosrach/Conrach Truaghan (Cosrach the Miserable) | 9th century (d. 898) | Irish | Buried on Inis Cealtra, Co. Clare | A holy anchorite who lived in the round tower on Inis Cealtra. His grave is visible today on the island. | 6 November | | |
| Cranat ingen Buicín | 6th century | | | Munster saint | | | |
| Crónán moccu Éile | 7th century (d. 665) | | Roscrea (Ros Cré) | Munster saint who founded Roscrea | 28 April | | |
| Crónán of Balla, see Mo Chua mac Bécáin | | | | | | | |
| Cruithnechán | 6th century | | Kilcronaghan | Ulster saint. Cited as the fosterfather and teacher of Saint Columba. He founded the church of Kilcronaghan, which was named after him along with the local parish. | 7 March | | |
| Cuimín of Kilcummin | | | Kilcummin | Connacht saint | | | |
| Cumméne Find | 7th century (d. 669) | | Iona | abbot of Iona | | | |
| Cumméne Fota | 6th century (c.591–662) | | Clonfert | Connacht saint, successor of Brendan of Clonfert | 12 November | | |
| Curchach/Corcaria | ? | Irish | Cluain-Lothair (Cloonlogher, Co. Leitrim) | A virgin saint, probably an abbess or a foundress | 8 August | | |
| Daig mac Cairill | 6th century (d. 587) | | Inishkeen (Inis Caín Dega) | Ulster saint | 18 August | | |
| Dallán Forgaill | | | | | | | |
| Dalua | 5th century | British (probably) | Tigh Bretan (Tibradden, Co. Dublin) | Almost certainly identical to another Dalua of Croibech (Cruagh, Co. Dublin?) | 7 January | | |
| Daire (Daria/Dara) | 5th century | Irish | Kildare | A nun companion of St. Brigid of Kildare, she was cured of blindness by St. Brigid but then requested to be made blind again to protect her soul from the temptations of the world. | 8 August | | |
| Déclán of Ardmore | 5th century, late | | Ardmore | Munster saint | 24 July | | |
| Derchairtainn (Daorchaorthainn) | ? | Irish | Tullow, Co. Carlow | A female saint who was a nun at Tullow along with her sister St. Eithne. They were mentioned in the Book of Lecan and called the daughters of Cormac. | ? | | |
| Derchairtainn/Doarchaorthainn | 6th century | Irish | Ouchter Ard (Co. Kildare) | A female Irish saint, a virgin who served as a prioress or abbess of a convent at Ouchter Ard. | 8 March | | |
| Derlugdacha | 5th century, late | | Kildare monastery | 2nd Abbess of Kildare | 1 Feb | | |
| Díchu mac Trichim | 5th century | Irish | Saul, Co. Down | Ulster saint, of the Dál Fiatach. A chieftain who became the first convert of St. Patrick. | 29 April | | |
| Donnán | | | Eigg | | | | |
| Dublitter | 8th century (d. 796) | Irish | Finglas | Meath saint; abbot, scholar and presumably bishop of Finglas; associated with the Céli Dé | 15 May | | |
| Dymphna | 7th century | Irish | Tydavnet, County Monaghan | Fled with her confessor to Belgium, in order to escape the incestuous advances of her grieving father. Subsequently killed by him, when she refused to return to Ireland with him. | 30 May | | |
| Echtach | | Irish | unknown | A female saint and a virgin | 5 February | | |
| Eithne/Etna | 5th century | Irish | Cruachan and Armagh Cathedral | Called 'the golden-haired', she was a princess and the daughter of King Laoghaire, who was baptised by St. Patrick together with her sister St. Fidelma. | 11 January | | |
| Eithne/Etna | 6th century | Irish | Eileach-an-Naoimh, (Garvellach islands, Scotland) | The mother of St. Colmcille/Columba | | | |
| Eithne and Sodelb | 6th century | Leinster | Tech ingen mBóiti | Leinster saints | 29 March and other dates | | |
| Do Biu mac Comgaill | 5th century? | | Inch (Inis Causcraid), County Down | Ulster saint | 22 July | | |
| Dúnchad mac Cinn Fáelad | 8th century (d. 717) | | Iona | Abbot of Iona | 25 March | | |
| Emer/Eimear | 5th century | Irish | Clonbroney, Co. Longford | A female saint and daughter of Milchú (St. Patrick's slave master). She reputedly founded a convent or church at Cluain Bronaigh (Clonbroney) together with her sister. A national school is named after her. | ? | | |
| Emer/Imer/Imy | 6th century | Irish | Killimer, Co. Clare | A female saint associated with Killimer, where a holy well bears her name. She is believed to have founded a church/nunnery at Killimer and was a relative of St. Senan and St. Cainnear of Scattery Island. Nothing else is known about her. | 13 August | | |
| Énda mac Conaill | 6th century? | | Inismore (Inis Mór) | Munster saint | 21 March | | |
| Énna mac Nuadhan | 6th century? | | Emlaghfad, County Sligo | Sligo saint | 18 September | | |
| Éogan mac Dega | 6th century, late | | Ardstraw | Ulster saint | 23 August | | |
| Erc mac Dega | 5th–6th centuries (d. 513) | | Slane, County Meath | Meath Saint, patron of Slane | 2 November | | |
| Ercnat ingen Dáire | 5th–6th centuries | | Duneane (Dún dá Én) | Ulster saint | 8 January | | |
| Ernan (4 saints) | 6th-7th centuries | | | | | | |
| Etchen | 6th century | | Clonfad | Abbot of Clonfad | 11 February | | |
| Ethelhun/Athelhun/Edilhun | 7th century | English (but buried in Ireland) | Rathmelsigi (purportedly Clonmelsh in Carlow) | A young English monk who died of the plague while studying in Ireland. A friend of St. Egbert | 21 September | | |
| Fachtna mac Mongaig | 6th century | | Ross Carbery (Ros Ailithir) | Munster saint | 14 August | | |
| Fáelán | 8th century (fl. 734) | Irish | Cluain Móescna | Meath Saint | 9 January | | |
| Fáelán Amlabar, Fillan | 7th–8th centuries (d. 724) | | Iona | Abbot of Iona. | 20 June | | |
| Fainder (Fainnear, Fainer) | ? | Irish | Clonbroney, Co. Longford | An obscure virgin saint mentioned in the Book of Leinster called 'the chaste' | ? | | |
| Faoiltigearna/ Failtigerna | ? | Ireland | ? | A virgin saint | 17 March | | |
| Faoinir/Faenir | ? | Irish | Domhnach-Faeinir (probably Donaghenry, Co. Tyrone) | A male saint, the founder of a church or monastery at Donaghenry in Tyrone. | 29 October | | |
| Féchín moccu Cháe | 7th century | Irish, of contested origin | Fore (Fobar), County Westmeath | Meath saint | 20 January | | |
| Fergno Britt mac Faílbi (in Latin sources, Virgno) | 7th century (d. 623) | British, from southern Scotland (probably) | Iona | Abbot of Iona, probably a Briton | 2 March | | |
| Fiachan of Lismore | 7th century | Ireland | Lismore | Irish monk known for his obedience | 29 April | | |
| Fiachra, Fiacre | 7th century (middle) | Ireland | Breuil, Neustria | Irish pilgrim who travelled to Breuil in Neustria | 30 August | | |
| Fiadhnait/Fiadhnaid | ? | Ireland | ? | A virgin saint | 4 January | | |
| Fínán Cam mac Móenaig | 6th–7th centuries | Irish, of the Corcu Duibne | Kinnitty (Cenn Étig), County Offaly | Meath saint | 7 April | | |
| Findbarr mac Amairgin | 6th century? | | Cork | Munster saint | 25 September | | |
| Finnián mac Findloga | 6th century (d. c. 550) | Irish, of uncertain descent | Clonard | Meath and Leinster saint, who may have belonged to the Dál/Corcu Thelduib. Alternatively, it has been suggested that he was a localised version of Findbarr moccu Fiatach, an Ulster saint. | 12 December | | |
| Findbarr moccu Fiatach | 6th century (d. 579) | | Movilla | Ulster saint | 10 September | | |
| Finncheall | ? | Irish | Sliabh Guaire (Co. Cavan) | A virgin saint, probably an abbess | 25 January | | |
| Finnchu | 7th century (d. 655/5) | | Brigown (Brí Gobann) | Munster saint | | | |
| Finnseach/Findsech | ? | Irish | Sliabh Guaire (Co. Cavan) | A virgin saint, probably an abbess | 13 October | | |
| Finnseach/Findsech | ? | Irish | Cruaghan | A virgin saint | 9 November | | |
| Finten, also Fintan, Munnu | 7th century | | Taghmon (Tech Munnu), County Wexford | Leinster saint | 21 October | | |
| Fintan | 6th century (d. 603?) | | Clonenagh (Cluain Ednech) | Leinster saint | 17 February | | |
| Flannaid | 7th century | Irish | Fermoy, Co. Cork and Clondulane Co. Cork | A virgin saint from Fermoy who had a paralyzed arm which was cured miraculously by St. Carthach of Lismore. She later became a nun and founded a convent at Clondulane in Cork. | ? | | |
| Flannán mac Toirrdelbaig | 7th century | | Killaloe | Munster saint, patron of Killaloe | 18 December | | |
| Fledh | ? | Irish | Tech-Fleidhe (believed to be Kilfee (near Ashford) Co. Wicklow) | A virgin saint, the daughter of the king of Leinster and the founder of a church in Co. Wicklow. | 12 September | | A devotional image of Saint Fledh, an Irish saint |
| Fortiarnan (or Fortchern) | | Irish | Trim, Co. Meath and Tullow, Co. Carlow | A bishop, hermit, and blacksmith who created chalices and other precious metal objects. Patron of Tullow and Trim. | 17 February (and 12 June in Tullow) | | |
| Fuinnech | 7th century, late | Irish | Clonbroney (Cluain Brónaig) | Meath saint, probably founder and first abbess of Clonbroney | 11 December | | |
| Gall, Gallus | 6th-7th century (550 - 646) | Irish | St. Gallen Abbey and Cathedral | Studied under St. Comgall at Bangor Abbey | 16 October | | |
| Garald, Gerald | 7th–8th centuries (d. 732) | England | | Connacht saint | 12 March or 13 March | | |
| Gibrian | 5th–6th centuries | Irish | Reims, Saint-Gibrien, Chartreux | One of a group of Irish siblings (including Abran) who are said to have settled in the Marne region in Merovingian times | 8 May | | |
| Gobhan - Gobban Gobban Find mac Lugdach | 6th-7th centuries | Leinster - Ulster | Old Leighlin Killamery Portadown | Abbot and founder of St Laserian's Cathedral, Old Leighlin | 6 December | | |
| Gobnait | 6th century? | | Ballyvourney (Móin Mór, Bairnech, Baile Mhuirne) | Munster saint | 11 February | | |
| Grellán of Cráeb Grelláin | 5th–6th centuries | | Cráeb Grelláin | Connacht saint | 10 November | | |
| Guasacht maccu Buáin | 5th century, late | Irish | Granard, County Longford | Meath saint, bishop of Granard; two of his sisters are claimed to have founded Cluain Brónaig, though a rival claim makes Funech its founder | 24 January | | |
| Iarlaithe mac Loga | 6th century | | Tuam (Tuaimm dá Gualann) | Connacht saint | 25 December or 26 December | | |
| Ibar mac Lugna | 5th century (d. 500 / 501) | | Beggerin Island (Becc Ériu) | Munster saint | 23 April | | |
| Íte ingen Chinn Fhalad | 6th century (d. 570/77) | | | Munster saint | 15 January | | |
| Kentigerna/Caintigern | | | | | | | |
| Lachtín mac Tarbín, also Lachtnaín or Mo Lachtóc | 6th–7th centuries (d. 622/7) | | Freshford (Achad Úr); Ballyhoura Hills (Belach Febrat) | Munster saint, abbot of Achad Úr (Freshford) and Belach Febrat (Ballyhoura Hills) | 19 March | | |
| Laisrén mac Decláin | 6th century | | Inishmurray | Connacht saint | 12 August | | |
| Laisrén mac Feradaig | 6th century (d. 605) | | Iona | Abbot of Iona | | | |
| Laisrén mac Nad Froích | 6th century (d. 564) | | Devenish (Daiminis) | Ulster saint, patron of Daiminis (Devenish) | 12 September | | |
| Lallóc | 5th century | | Senles or Ard Senlis | Connacht saint | 6 February | | |
| Lassair (Lassera) | ? | Irish | Cill-Arcalgach (near Lough Lene in Co. Westmeath) | A virgin saint, probably an abbess or founder of a convent | 20 August | | |
| Lassair (Lassera) | | Irish | Maighin (possibly Moyne, Co. Wicklow) | A virgin saint called the daughter of Eoghan. An ancient convent existed at Maighin in Co. Wicklow, possibly founded by Lassair | 18 April | | |
| Laoghaire/Laeghaire | ? | Irish | Lough Conn | A bishop saint | 30 September | | |
| Leo of Inis Airc | Between 6th and 8th centuries | Irish | St Leo's Church, Inishark | Patron Saint of Inishark | | | |
| Lommán mac Dalláin | 5th–6th centuries | British | Trim | Meath Saint, patron of Trim | 17 February and 11 October | | |
| Lonán mac Talmaig | 5th–6th centuries | British (on mother's side)? | Trevet | Meath Saint | 1 November | | |
| Maccai | 5th century | Irish | Isle of Bute | | 11 April | | |
| Mac Caírthinn of Clogher | 5th century (d. 506) | | Clogher | Ulster saint | 24 March | | |
| Mac Creiche mac Pessláin | 6th century, late | | | Munster saint | 11 August, but recently Garland Sunday | | |
| Mac Cuilinn mac Cathmoga, also Maculinus or Cuindid | 5th century | Irish, of the Ciannachta? | Lusk | Meath saint | 6 December | | |
| Mac Nisse of Connor | 5th–6th centuries (d' 507/508) | | Connor | Ulster saint | 3 September | | |
| Máedóc of Ferns (also known as Aedan) | 7th century (d. 625?) | Inisbrefny, Ireland | Ferns | First Bishop of Ferns, learned under David at Deheubarth | 31 January | | |
| Máel Brigte mac Tornáin | 10th century (d. 927) | | Iona | Abbot of Iona | 22 February | | |
| Máel Cétair mac Rónáin | 6th–7th centuries? | | | Munster saint | 14 May | | |
| Máel Ruain | 8th century (d. 792) | | Tallaght | Leinster Saint. | 7 July | | |
| Malachy (Máel Máedoc Ua Morgair) | | | | | | | |
| Manchán of Mohill (Manchán of Maothail) | 5th and 6th centuries (d. 535-538) | Ireland or Wales | multiple churches | Connacht, Leinster | 14 February | | |
| Maonacan of Athleague | 5th and/or 6th centuries | Ireland | Athleague, County Roscommon | Connacht | 18 February | | |
| Manchán mac Silláin | 7th century (d. 665) | Irish | Lemanaghan | Meath Saint | 24 January | | |
| Mainchín mac Setnai | 6th century | | | Munster saint | 2 January | | |
| Mél of Ardagh | 5-6th centuries | Irish | Ardagh (Ardachad), County Longford, then in the kingdom of southern Tethbae | Leinster Saint | 6 February | | |
| Mella (Mealla) | 8th century | Irish | Doire-Melle (near Lough Melvin, Co. Leitrim) | A wife and mother who became a nun and an abbess. She was the mother of St. Tighernach and St. Cainneach (of Aghaboe?) | 31 March | | |
| Saint Midabaria | 6th centuries | Irish | Bumlin, Strokestown, County Roscommon | Connacht saint | 22 February | | |
| Mo Chua mac Bécáin | 7th century (d. 694) | | Balla | Connacht saint | 30 March | | |
| Mo Chóe of Nendrum | 5th century (d. 497) | | Nendrum | Ulster saint | 23 June | | |
| Mo Chóemóc mac Béoáin | 7th century (d. 656) | | | Munster saint | 13 March | | |
| Mo Chutu of Lismore | 7th century (d. 637) | | Lismore and Rahan | Munster saint | 14 May | | |
| Mo Genóc | 5th century? | | Kilglinn (Cell Dumai Glinn), County Meath | Meath saint, patron of Cell Dumai Glinn (Kilglinn) in southern Brega | 26 December | | |
| Mo Ling | 7th century (d. 697) | | St Mullins (Tech Moling) | Leinster Saint. Founder and abbot of St Mullins (Tech Moling) | 17 June | | |
| Mo Lua moccu Óche | 6th–7th centuries (554–609) | | Killaloe and Clonfertmulloe | Munster saint, abbot and founder of Killaloe | | | |
| Mo Lua of Kilmoluagh | | | Kilmoluagh | Connacht saint | | | |
| Mochta, Mochtae | 6th century (d. 535) | British | Louth, County Louth | Meath Saint | 24 March | | |
| Móenu or Moínenn | 6th century (d. c. 572) | British (probably) | Clonfert | Connacht saint, bishop of Clonfert | 1 March | | |
| Mo Laga mac Duib Dligid | 6th century, late? | | | Munster saint | 20 January | | |
| Moninne, Mo Ninne | 6th century, first half | | Killevy | Ulster saint, founder of Killevy | 6 July | | |
| Mucnoe (in Latin, Mucneus) | 5th–6th centuries | | | Connacht saint. According to Tírechán, buried at Domnach Mór | | | |
| Muirchú | | | | | | | |
| Muiredach mac Echdach | 6th century | | Killala | Connacht saint. Feast day: 12 August (in place of Mucnoe) | 12 August | | |
| Munis | 5th century? | | Forgney (Forgnaide), County Westmeath, resting place | Meath saint, bishop "in Forgnaide among the Cuircne" | 18 December | | |
| Muru mac Feradaig | 7th century, first half | | Fahan | Ulster saint | 12 March | | |
| Nath Í of Achonry | 6th century | | Achonry | Connacht saint | | | |
| Nessán (Mo Nessóc) | 6th century (d. 556) | | Mungret (Mungairit) | Munster saint, of the Uí Fhidgeinte | 25 July | | |
| Órán/Odhrán | 5th century | Irish | ? (killed along the Kildare-Offaly border) | The first Christian martyr of Ireland. He was a charioteer and a disciple of St. Patrick who was killed with a spear, saving Patrick. | 19 February | | A devotional image of Saint Odhran, the charioteer of St. Patrick |
| Óengus of Tallaght | 9th century (d. 824) | Ossory saintClonenagh | Tallaght (Tamlacht) | Author of the Félire Óengusso | 11 March | | |
| Olcán | 5th century | | | Ulster saint | 20 February | | |
| Orna/Odharnait | ? | Ireland | 'Druim-mc-feradhaich' (unknown locality) | A virgin saint | 13 November | | |
| Palladius | 4th-5th centuries | France (but worked in Ireland) | County Wicklow | The first Christian bishop in Ireland (purportedly). He evangelized the area around modern County Wicklow before moving to Scotland. | 7 July | | |
| Patrick | 4th–5th centuries | | | Most recognized patron saint of Ireland | 17 March | | |
| Raoiriú | 6th century | | Connacht | | | | |
| Rioghnach/ Ríonach/Rynagh | 6th century | Irish | Banagher, Co. Offaly and Kilrainy, Co. Kildare | A virgin saint, the sister of St. Finnian of Clonard. She founded a convent near Banagher in Offaly | ? | | |
| Rónán of Locronan | 6th century? | | Locronan and Quimper (Brittany) | Irish pilgrim saint and hermit in western Brittany, eponymous founder of Locronan and co-patron of Quimper, together with its founder St Corentin | 1 June | | |
| Ruadán mac Fergusa Birn | 6th century (d. 584) | | Lorrha (Lothra) | Munster saint | 15 April | | |
| Sachellus | 5th century | | Baislec | Connacht saint | | | |
| Samthann ingen Díaráin | 8th century | Irish | Clonbroney (Cluain Brónaig) | Meath saint; abbess of Clonbroney | 19 September | | |
| Scaithin (Possibly is St. Scuithin) | | Irish (Probably) | Inisbofin | | | | |
| Scannlach | | Irish | Ard Scannlaighe (unknown) possibly in Munster | A female saint, a virgin. | 10 December | | |
| Scoth/Scothnait | 6th century | Irish | Clonmaskil, Co. Westmeath | A virgin saint, reputedly the aunt of St. Senan of Scattery Island. She was a nun and possibly a founder | 16 July | | |
| Scuithin | 6th-7th centuries | Leinster | Castlewarren County Kilkenny(Ossory) | Strong Welsh connections with St David | 2 January | | |
| Secundinus, Sechnall mac Restitiúit | 5th century | Continent? | Dunshaughlin (Domnach Sechnaill) | Meath Saint, described as a bishop of St Patrick | 27 November | | |
| Ségéne mac Fiachna | 7th century (d. 652) | | Iona | Abbot of Iona | | | |
| Segnait/Seghnaid | ? | Irish | 'Domhnach Ceirne' (unknown location) | A little-known virgin saint | 18 December | | |
| Senán mac Geirrcinn | 6th century | | Scattery Island (Inis Cathaig) | Munster saint | 1 March | | |
| Sodbalach | ? | Irish | ? | An anchorite commemorated in the Martyrology of Donegal. | 7 November | | |
| Sillán moccu Mind | 6th–7th centuries (d. 610) | | | Ulster saint | 28 February | | |
| Suibne moccu Urthrí | 7th century (d. 657) | | Iona | abbot of Iona | | | |
| Suibne/Sweeney | ? | Irish | Skellig Michael | A hermit who lived on Skellig Michael, possibly an abbot. | 28 April | | |
| Sylvester | 4th-5th century | Italian or French (died in Ireland) | Donard, Co. Wicklow | A companion of St. Palladius who accompanied him from France to Ireland as a missionary. He died at Donard in Co. Wicklow where his body was interred together with St. Solonius. | 19 August | | |
| Talla | ? | Irish | Inis-Daighre (Inishterry, Co. Antrim) | A virgin saint, possibly the abbess or foundress of a convent on Inishterry island. | 11 August | | |
| Teagáin/Tegan/ Tagain | 4th/5th century | Welsh (but worked in Ireland) | Kiltegan (Ireland) and Llandaff, (Wales) | A little-known male saint, reputedly from Wales and a disciple of St. Patrick. He was a missionary bishop who founded a church at Kiltegan in Co. Wicklow. | ? | | |
| Tigernach of Clones | 6th century (d. 549) | | Clones | Ulster saint | 4 April | | |
| Tirechán | | | | | | | |
| Tochumra | | Irish | | Virgin | 11 June | | |
| Tuán | ? | Irish | Tamlacht (Co. Down) | A little-known male saint, possibly a hermit or abbot | 1 April | | |
| Tuilelath/Tillala | | Irish | Kildare | One of the abbesses of St. Brigid's convent at Kildare. Her two sisters Muadhnait and Osnait are also saints. | 6 January | | |
| Ultán moccu Chonchobair | 7th century | Irish | Ardbraccan; Dál Conchobair | Meath saint; abbot of Ardbraccan and bishop of Dál Conchobair | 4 September | | |
| Vincent (Uinseann) | 6th century | Irish | Iona | Ulster saint | 4 September | | |
| Virgno, see Fergno Britt above | | | | | | | |
| Wasnulf | 7th century | Irish | | Missionary in Hainaut | 1 October | | |

== Early Irish martyr saints ==
- St. Ceannanach
- St. Blathmacc of Iona
- St. Donnan of Eigg
- St. Ia of Cornwall
- St. Odhran the Charioteer
- St. Colman Isirni (the Thirsty)
- St. Colman of Stockerau
- St. Dymphna of Gheel
- St. Killian of Wurzburg
- St. Totnan of Wurzburg
- St. Colman of Wurzburg
- St. Grimonia
- St. Eliphius of Toul
- St. Hiero of Holland
- St. Maxentia of Beauvais
- St. Brigid and Maura

== Later saints ==
Later saints include:

- Saint Charles of Mount Argus (1821–1893)
- Saint Oliver Plunkett (1625–1681)
- Saint Laurence O'Toole (1128–1180)
- Saint Malachy O'Moore (1094–1148)
- Saint Fergal of Salzburg (canonised 1233 AD)

== Pope Leo XIII's canonisations ==
In 1902, Pope Leo XIII added a group of 25 medieval Irish male saints to the Roman Martyrology, giving them a greater significance to the majority of other Irish saints who were not officially canonised by the pope. They are as follows:

- Saint Kevin of Glendalough
- Saint Flannan of Killaloe
- Saint Eoghan of Ardstraw
- Saint Ciaran of Clonmacnois
- Saint Declan of Ardmore
- Saint Albert of Cashel
- Saint Colman of Dromore
- Saint Colman of Cloyne
- Saint Colman MacDuagh
- Saint Comgall of Bangor
- Saint Finbarr of Cork
- Saint Finnian of Clonard
- Saint Laserian of Leighlin
- Saint Muiredach of Killala
- Saint Carthach of Lismore
- Saint Tassach of Elphin
- Saint Nathy of Achonry
- Saint Oran of Iona
- Saint Felim of Kilmore
- Saint Jarlath of Tuam
- Saint Conleth of Kildare
- Saint Aidan of Ferns
- Saint Aengus MacNissi of Connor
- Saint Aedh Mac Cairtinn of Clogher
- Saint Fachanan of Kilfenora

== Blesseds ==
- Blessed John, or Terrence, Carey (d. 1594)
- Blessed Ralph Corby (Corbington) (1598-1644), professed priest, Jesuits, born in Ireland but included in the Martyrs of England and Wales
- Blessed John Grove (d. 1679), layman, born in Ireland but included in the Martyrs of England and Wales
- Blessed Tadhg (Thaddeus) McCarthy, bishop (d. 1492)
- Blessed Christian O'Conarchy, Irish Cistercian abbot (d. 1186)
- Blessed Columba Marmion, Benedictine priest
- Blessed Charles Meehan (Mahoney) (1640-1679), professed priest, Franciscan Friars Minor (Recollects), born in Ireland but included in the Martyrs of England and Wales
- Blessed Dermot O'Hurley, Archbishop of Cashel, and 16 Companions, martyrs
  - Patrick O'Hely professed priest, Franciscan Friars Minor (Observants); bishop of Mayo
  - Conn O'Rourke, professed priest, Franciscan Friars Minor (Observants)
  - Matthew Lambert, layman
  - Robert Meyler, layman
  - Edward Cheevers, layman
  - Patrick Cavanagh, layman
  - Margaret Ball, laywoman
  - Maurice MacKenragaghty, priest
  - Dominic Collins, professed religious, Jesuits
  - Concobhar Ó Duibheannaigh, professed priest, Franciscan Friars Minor (Observants); bishop of Down and Connor
  - Patrick O'Loughran, priest of the archdiocese of Armagh
  - Francis Taylor, layman
  - Peter Higgins, professed priest, Dominicans
  - Terence O'Brien, professed priest, Dominicans; bishop of Emly
  - John Kearney, professed priest, Franciscan Friars Minor (Observants)
  - William Tirry, professed priest, Augustinians
- Blessed Edmund Ignatius Rice, founder of the Congregation of Christian Brothers and the Presentation Brothers (d. 1844)
- Blessed John Roche (d. 1588), layman, born in Ireland but included in the Martyrs of England and Wales
- Blessed Patrick Salmon, companion-martyr of John Cornelius
- Blessed John Sullivan, professed priest, Jesuits

== Venerables ==
- Venerable Mary Aikenhead, founder of the Religious Sisters of Charity
- Venerable Catherine McAuley, founder of the Sisters of Mercy
- Venerable Mary Angeline Teresa McCrory, founder, Carmelite Sisters for the Aged and Infirm; born in Ireland
- Venerable Nano Nagle, founder of the Presentation Sisters
- Venerable Patrick Peyton, professed priest, Congregation of Holy Cross; born in Ireland
- Venerable Edel Quinn, member, Legion of Mary, born in Ireland
- Venerable Matt Talbot, lay ascetic

== Servants of God ==
Irish people, described as Servants of God, include:

- Father Willie Doyle, Irish priest and army chaplain
- Frank Duff, Legion of Mary founder
- Mary Kevin Kearney, missionary nun and foundress of the Little Sisters of St. Francis in Uganda.
- Alphonsus (Alfie Lambe), Legion of Mary envoy to South America

== Other holy people ==
- Ellen Organ, an Irish child who became known as "Little Nellie of God" and whose story prompted Pope Pius X to lower the age of first communion.
- Egbert Xavier Kelly, an Irish Christian Brother who was abducted and killed during the Manila massacre in 1945.
- Sister Clare Crockett, an Irish nun who died in the 2016 Ecuador earthquake.

== See also ==
- Irish Catholic Martyrs
- List of Catholic saints
- List of Anglo-Saxon saints
- List of Cornish saints
- List of Welsh saints
- List of saints of Northumbria
- List of Breton saints
- List of saints of the Canary Islands
- Saint Gobain

== Sources ==
- Charles-Edwards, T. M. (Jan 2007) [Sept 2004]. "Connacht, saints of (act. c.400–c.800)". Oxford Dictionary of National Biography. Oxford Dictionary of National Biography (Online ed.). Oxford University Press. doi:10.1093/ref:odnb/51012. (Subscription, Wikipedia Library access or UK public library membership required.)
- Charles-Edwards, T. M. (Sep 2004). "Iona, abbots of (act. 563–927)". Oxford Dictionary of National Biography. Oxford Dictionary of National Biography (online ed.). Oxford University Press. doi:10.1093/ref:odnb/51141. (Subscription, Wikipedia Library access or UK public library membership required.)
- Charles-Edwards, T. M. (2004). "Brigit (439/452–524/526)". Oxford Dictionary of National Biography. Oxford Dictionary of National Biography. Vol. 1 (online ed.). Oxford University Press. doi:10.1093/ref:odnb/3427. (Subscription, Wikipedia Library access or UK public library membership required.)
- Charles-Edwards, T. M. (Jan 2007) [Sept 2004]. "Ulster, saints of (act. c.400–c.650)". Oxford Dictionary of National Biography. Oxford Dictionary of National Biography (online ed.). Oxford University Press. doi:10.1093/ref:odnb/51011. (Subscription, Wikipedia Library access or UK public library membership required.)
- Doherty, Charles (2004). "Leinster, saints of (act. c.550–c.800)". Oxford Dictionary of National Biography. Oxford Dictionary of National Biography (online ed.). Oxford University Press. doi:10.1093/ref:odnb/51009. (Subscription, Wikipedia Library access or UK public library membership required.)
- Flanagan, M. T. (2004). "Cellach (1080–1129)". Oxford Dictionary of National Biography. Oxford Dictionary of National Biography (online ed.). Oxford University Press. doi:10.1093/ref:odnb/4992. (Subscription, Wikipedia Library access or UK public library membership required.)
- Johnston, Elva (May 2008) [Sept 2004]. "Munster, saints of (act. c.450–c.700)". Oxford Dictionary of National Biography. Oxford Dictionary of National Biography. Vol. 1 (online ed.). Oxford University Press. doi:10.1093/ref:odnb/51008. (Subscription, Wikipedia Library access or UK public library membership required.)
- Johnston, Elva (2004), "Beoán (supp. fl. 1012x24)", Oxford Dictionary of National Biography (Online ed.), Oxford University Press
- Johnston, Elva (2004). "Fiachra (fl. mid-7th cent.)". Oxford Dictionary of National Biography. Oxford Dictionary of National Biography. Vol. 1 (Online ed.). Oxford University Press. doi:10.1093/ref:odnb/9378. (Subscription, Wikipedia Library access or UK public library membership required.)
- Johnston, Elva (2004). "Mo Ling (d. 697)". Oxford Dictionary of National Biography. Oxford Dictionary of National Biography (Online ed.). Oxford University Press. doi:10.1093/ref:odnb/7007. (Subscription, Wikipedia Library access or UK public library membership required.)
- Kenney, James F. (1966) [1929], The sources for the early history of Ireland: ecclesiastical (revised ed.), New York
- MacNeill, Máire (1962). The Festival of Lughnasa: A Study of the Survival of the Celtic Festival of the Beginning of Harvest. London: Oxford University Press.
- Ní Dhonnchadha, Máirín (2004). "Adomnán [St Adomnán] (627/8?–704)". Oxford Dictionary of National Biography. Oxford Dictionary of National Biography (online ed.). Oxford University Press. doi:10.1093/ref:odnb/110. (Subscription, Wikipedia Library access or UK public library membership required.)
- Stalmans, Nathalie; Charles-Edwards, T. M. (May 2007) [Sept 2004]. "Meath, saints of (act. c.400–c.900)". Oxford Dictionary of National Biography. Oxford Dictionary of National Biography. Vol. 1 (online ed.). Oxford University Press. doi:10.1093/ref:odnb/51010. (Subscription, Wikipedia Library access or UK public library membership required.)
- "Under the Oak: Irish Saints of September". Under the Oak.
