= Colman (given name) =

Colman or Colmán is a masculine given name which may refer to:

== Saints ==
- Saint Colman (martyr) (c. 600–689), Irish priest and missionary to Franconia and Thüringen
- Saint Colmán of Ardboe, 6th–7th century founder of Ardboe Monastery
- Colmán of Cloyne (530–606), Bishop of Cloyne
- Colmán of Dromore (before 470 or 475–after 520), Irish abbot and bishop
- Colmán Elo (555–611), founder and first abbot of Muckamore, also regarded as the Bishop of Connor
- Colman mac Duagh (c. 560–632), Bishop of Kilmacduagh
- Colmán of Kilroot, 6th century bishop of Kilroot
- Colmán of Lann, 7th century Irish abbot and patron saint of Lann
- Colmán of Lindisfarne (died 676), Bishop of Lindisfarne
- Coloman of Stockerau (Colmán) (died 1012), Irish pilgrim martyred in Austria
- Colman of Templeshambo (died 595), Abbot of Templeshambo

== Others ==
- Colmán Bec (died c. 585), Irish dynast, son of Colmán Már mac Diarmato
- Colmán mac Cobthaig (died c. 622), Irish king
- Colmán of Cloyne (530–606), Irish poet and monk
- Colmán Már mac Diarmato (died 555/558), Irish king
- Colmán Rímid (died c. 612), Irish king
- Colman nepos Cracavist (fl. c. 800), Hiberno-Latin poet
- Colman Domingo (born 1969), American actor, writer and director
- Colman McCarthy (1938–2026), American journalist and peace activist
- Colman O'Donovan (1927–2025), Irish hurler
