= Olcan =

Olcan is a Turkish and Irish given name for males.

People named Olcan include:

- Olcan Adın, Turkish footballer
- Olcan McFetridge, Irish retired sportsperson
- Olcan ‘The Body’ Shaw, famous Irish Pintman

== See also ==
- St. Olcan
- St Olcan's High School
- Olcán
