= St. Berrihert's Kyle =

Ecclesiastic enclosure in County Tipperary, Ireland

- Cill Bheircheirt (Irish)
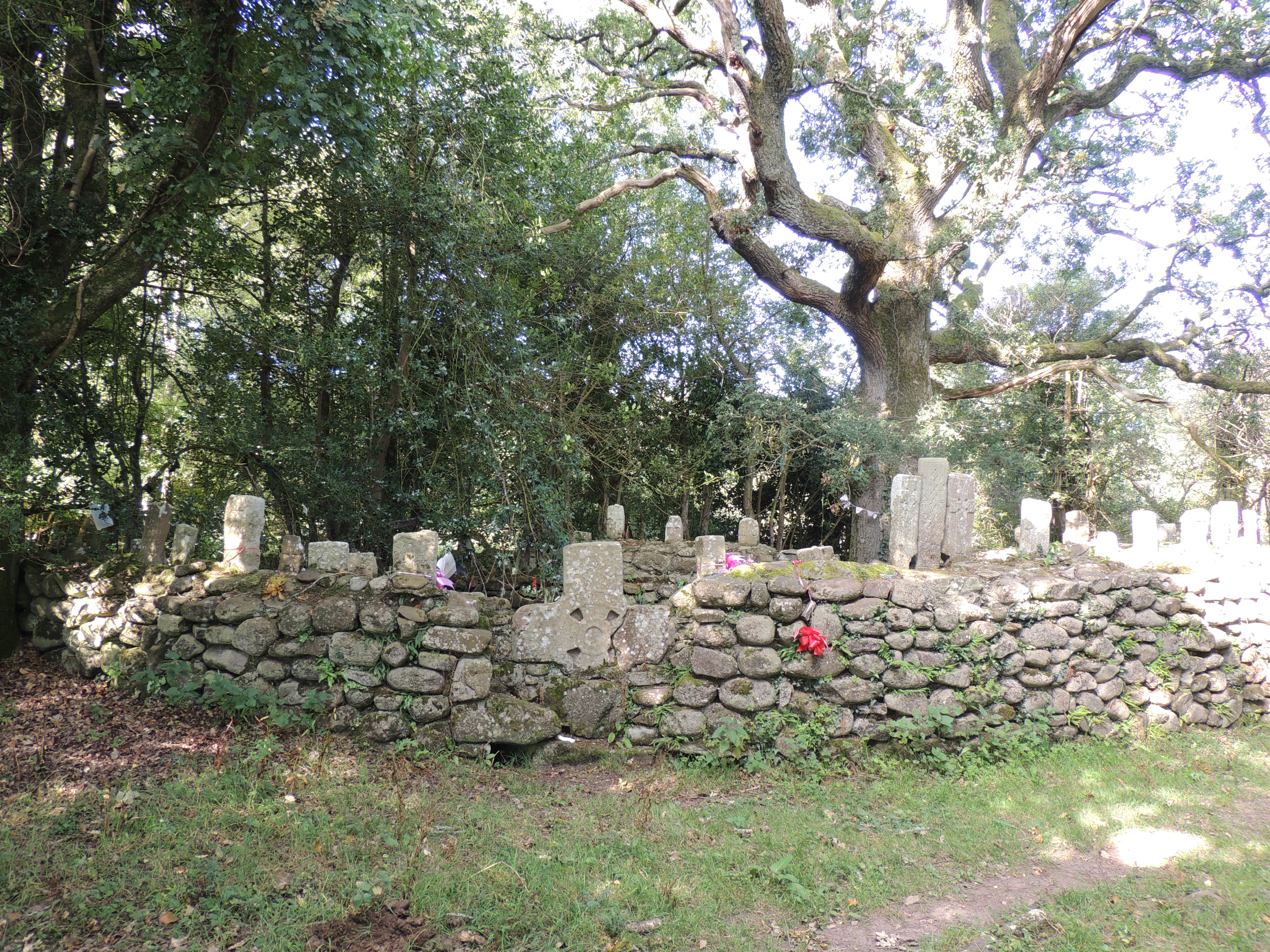

- Location within Ireland
- 52.410727°N 8.092677°W
- Type: cross slabs, wheel crosses, high crosses and a cursing stone
- Location: Ardane, Bansha, County Tipperary, Ireland

History
- Built: 7th–9th century; renovated 1946

Site notes
- Area: Glen of Aherlow

National monument of Ireland
- Official name: St. Berrihert's Kyle
- Reference no.: 396

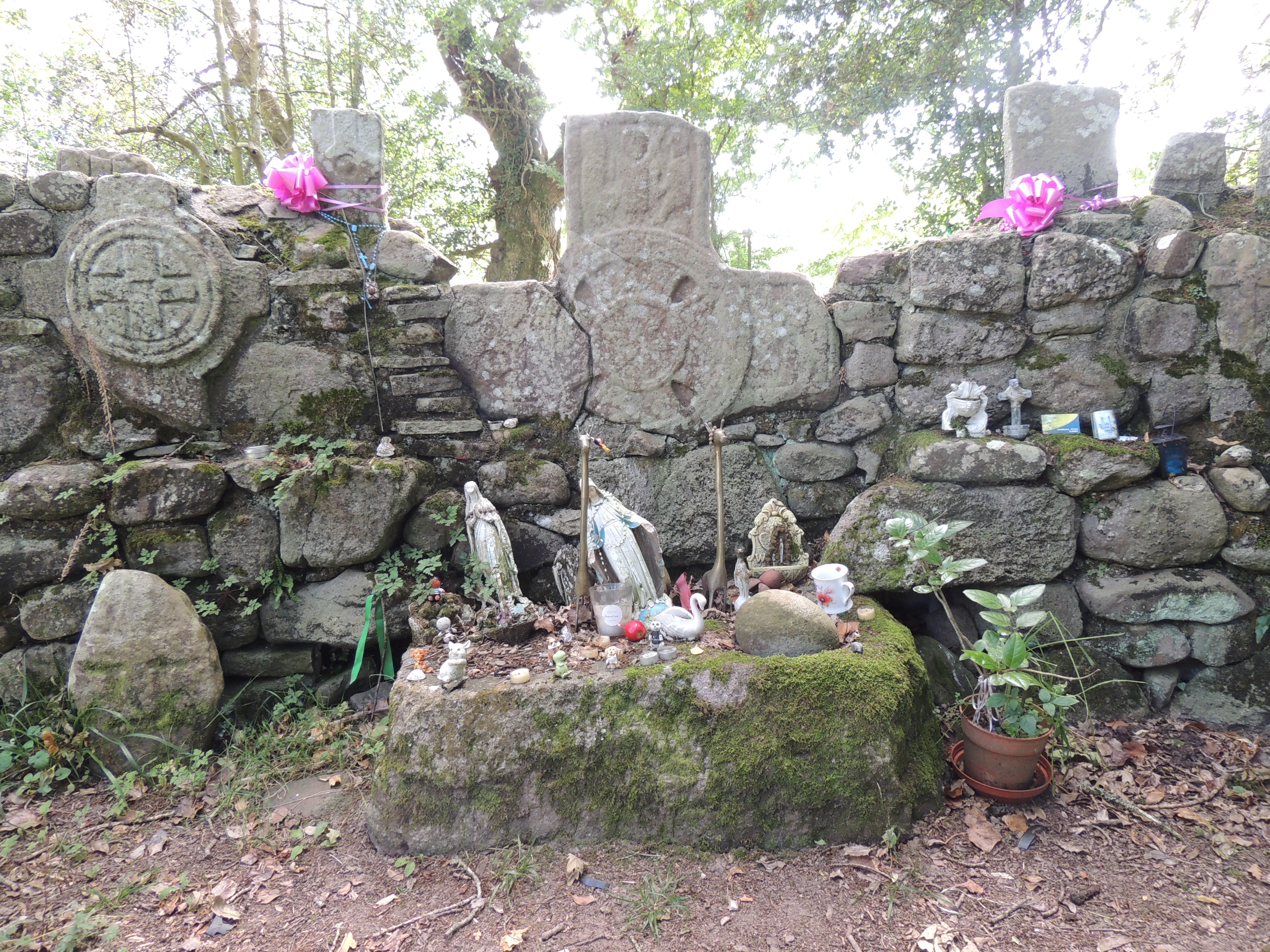
Shrine inside the Kyle, with offerings made by modern pilgrims.

St. Berrihert's Kyle is an ecclesiastical enclosure and National Monument containing cross slabs, wheel crosses, high crosses and a cursing stone located in County Tipperary, Ireland.

== Location ==
St. Berrihert's Kyle is located in the Glen of Aherlow at the foot of the Galtee Mountains, 4.5 km (2.8 mi) southwest of Bansha.

== History ==
St. Berrihert's Kyle is named after Saint Berrihert (Berrahert, Bernihardt, Bericheart), an Anglo-Saxon holy man who is traditionally believed to have come to the Glen after the Synod of Whitby (AD 664), and in some biographies is the brother of Gerald of Mayo (d. 731). He may be the same as Saint Berchert. Many Saxon monks came to the region after the controversy at that synod over the dating of Easter. He is probably the same man as St Berichter, the patron of an early medieval ecclesiastical site at Tullylease, County Cork. A cross slab there mentions Beirchachtuire, an Irish version of the Anglo-Saxon name Beorhtwine ("bright friend"). The Annals of the Four Masters mention the death of Berichtir of Tulach Leis on 6 December 839; this could be an error for 739. His feast day is 18 February. In some legends, "Saint Berihert" was the brother of legendary saint Latiaran.

A vast collection of stone cross slabs and other monuments were placed in the Kyle (from Irish cill, "church"; a medieval church once stood on the spot).

== Description ==
St. Berrihert's Kyle is a stone enclosure containing a variety of stone monuments: 72 slabs, fragments of a bullaun stone, four wheel crosses, the head and base of a high cross, the head of a small cross and a slab with an incomplete inscription on it. It is possible that the walls of the church were taken away for other building use, but the carved stones were considered sacred and so were left on site.

The stone enclosure is a recent construction, built in 1946 by the Office of Public Works.

=== St. Berrihert's Well ===
Nearby is a holy well; a pool 20 m (66 ft) across traditionally believed to heal scalds and burns.
