= Cooey of Portaferry =

Saint Cooey
- Major shrine: St Cooey's Wells

St Cooey of Portaferry, also known as St Cowey or St Cu’Mhaighe, was an early Christian saint from Northern Ireland. He is associated with the area around Portaferry.

== Life ==
Little is known about St Cooey other than that which has been preserved through oral tradition, as no known records or documents about him exist. He is thought to have lived in the 7th and 8th centuries.

Locally, he is remembered for founding what later became Witter's parish church; today, only the foundation stones of the building remain. The ancient site later became known as Templecooey, and is the location of St Cooey's Wells. What remains of the church is thought to date from the 7th century. It is said that St Cooey prayed and performed miracles on a rock near the shoreline.

According to tradition, St Cooey was strict and disciplined in his act of penitence, which impressed the local people and persuaded them to follow his faith.

Legend dictates that St Cooey was going to become the Abbot of Movilla, but he died before this could happen.

== Legacy ==
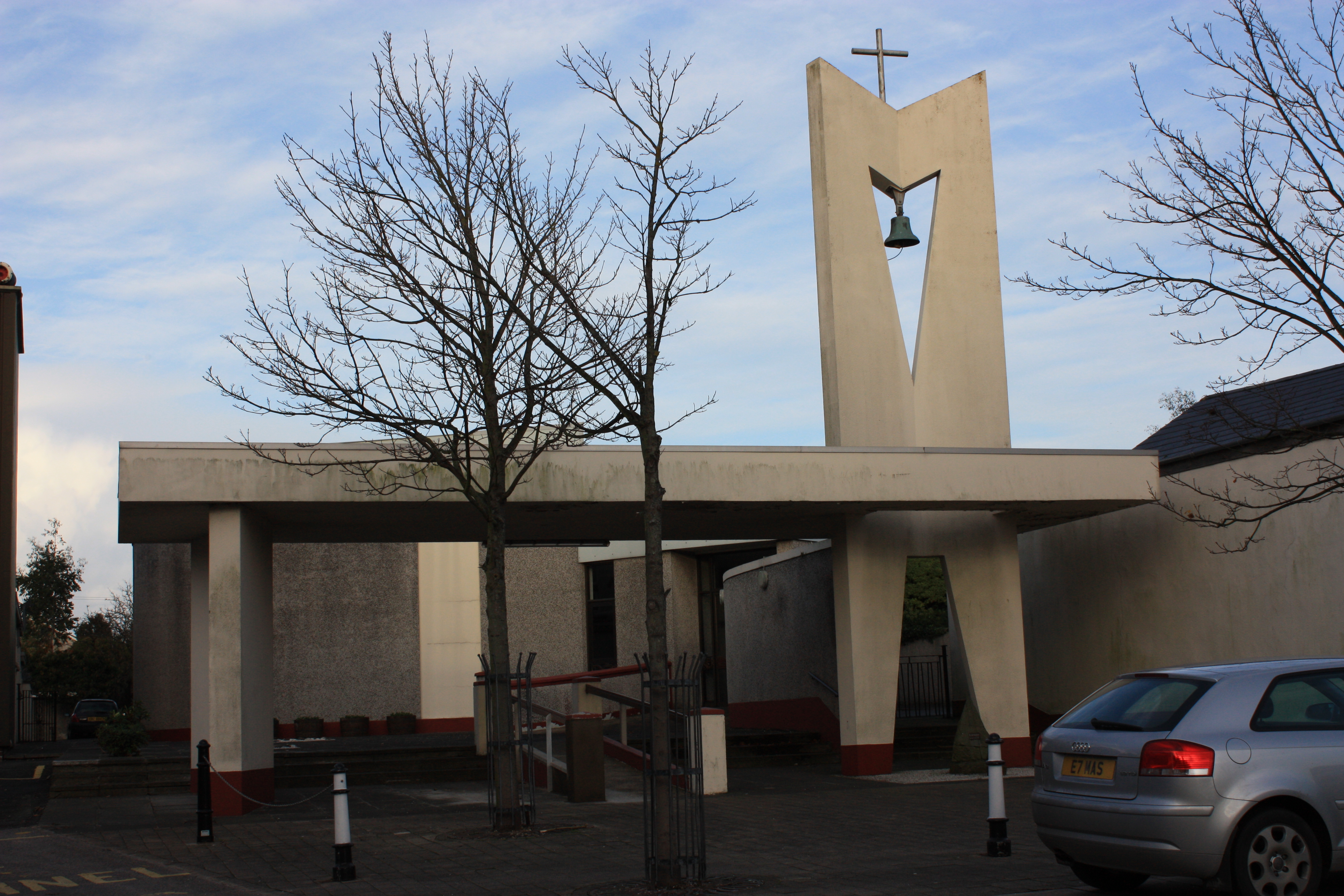
St Cooey's Oratory, Portaferry

Several places near to Templecooey, in the Portaferry area, are named after St Cooey, such as Lough Cowey and the Cruachan Cowey earthworks, which have now been ploughed over.

St Cooey was chosen as the patron saint of St Cooey's Oratory, a newly-built church in Portaferry, when it was constructed in 1966.

== See also ==
- List of Catholic saints
- List of saints of Ireland
