= Blath of Kildare =

Saint Blath of Kildare

Virgin
- Died: 523 (alleged)
- Honored in: Roman Catholic Church Eastern Orthodox Church
- Feast: 29 January
- Attributes: bread; pitcher of milk; platter of food; bacon
- Patronage: Cooks; Kildare

Saint Blath or Bláthnait (Latin: Flora) is an Irish saint who served as a lay-sister and cook in Saint Brigid's abbey at Kildare. Her name, Blath, is the Irish word for 'flower.' The Martyrology of Gorman refers to her as 'blooming Blath', thus the Latinized Flora, that Saint Blath is also referred to. Beyond her role as cook and her involvement in one notable miracle associated with Saint Brigid, her recognition mostly stems from her association with Saint Brigid and brief mentions of her in martyrologies and hagiographical texts. Her feast day is January 29.

== Life ==
Blath is described as a humble handmaid cook of Saint Brigid who lived in "simple obedience" during the fifth or sixth century. She is described as pious and occupying a subordinate position within Saint Brigid's convent, and her performance of her duties gained her the respect of the abbess and community at Kildare. In The Book of Saints, Saint Blath is described as a lay-sister who gained a great reputation for sanctity. In The Saints of Ireland, Blath is described as the lay sister in charge of Brigid's kitchen.

It is written that the "bread and bacon in Brigid's company were better than a banquet elsewhere." in relation to Blath's cooking.

Balth's death has been dated to 523. John O'Hanlon in Lives of the Irish Saints, writes that this date has no supporting data, and is "apparently only on the assumption, she much have departed during that year [...] connected with the demise of Kildare's illustrious foundress."

== Miracles ==
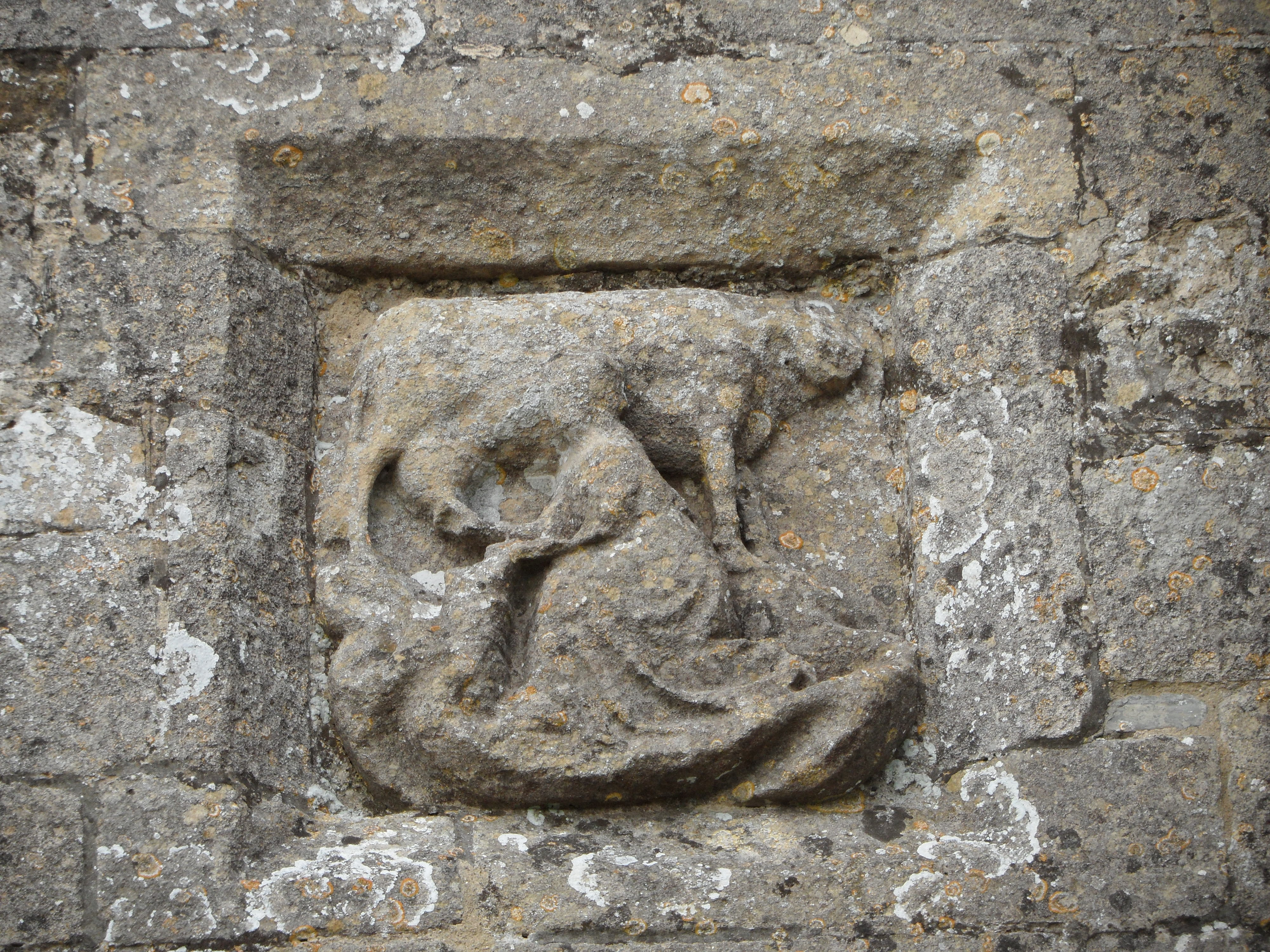
Milkmaid, possibly Saint Brigid milking a cow.

The most prominent miraculous incident in which Saint Blath is directly mentioned is the Miracle of Loch Lemnachta (meaning 'New-milk Lough'), which is recounted in the notes to the Martyrology of Oengus. The story highlights Blath's role in the management of the convent's food production:

Eight bishops came to Brigit [Saint Brigid] out of Húi Briuin Cualann, i.e. from Telach na n-epscop to Loch Lemnachta beside Kildare on the north. Brigit asked her cook, Bláthnait, [Saint Blath] whether she had food for the bishops. Dixit ilia non. [she said no] [Brigid] was ashamed: so the angel told her to milk the cows again. The cows were milked and they filled the tubs, and they would have filled all the vessels in Leinster, so that the milk went over the vessels and made a lake thereof, wide Loch Lemnachta 'New-milk Lough' dicitur

== Veneration ==
Saint Blath's feast day is observed on January 29. She is recorded for this date in the Martyrology of Donegal, and the Martyrology of Gorman. Blath's name also appears in the Martyrology of Oengus, for January 29th, listed amongst other saints for this day.
