= Chapelle Saint-Gibrien =

Chapel in Montcourt, France

Coordinates: 48°28′49″N 5°44′46″E

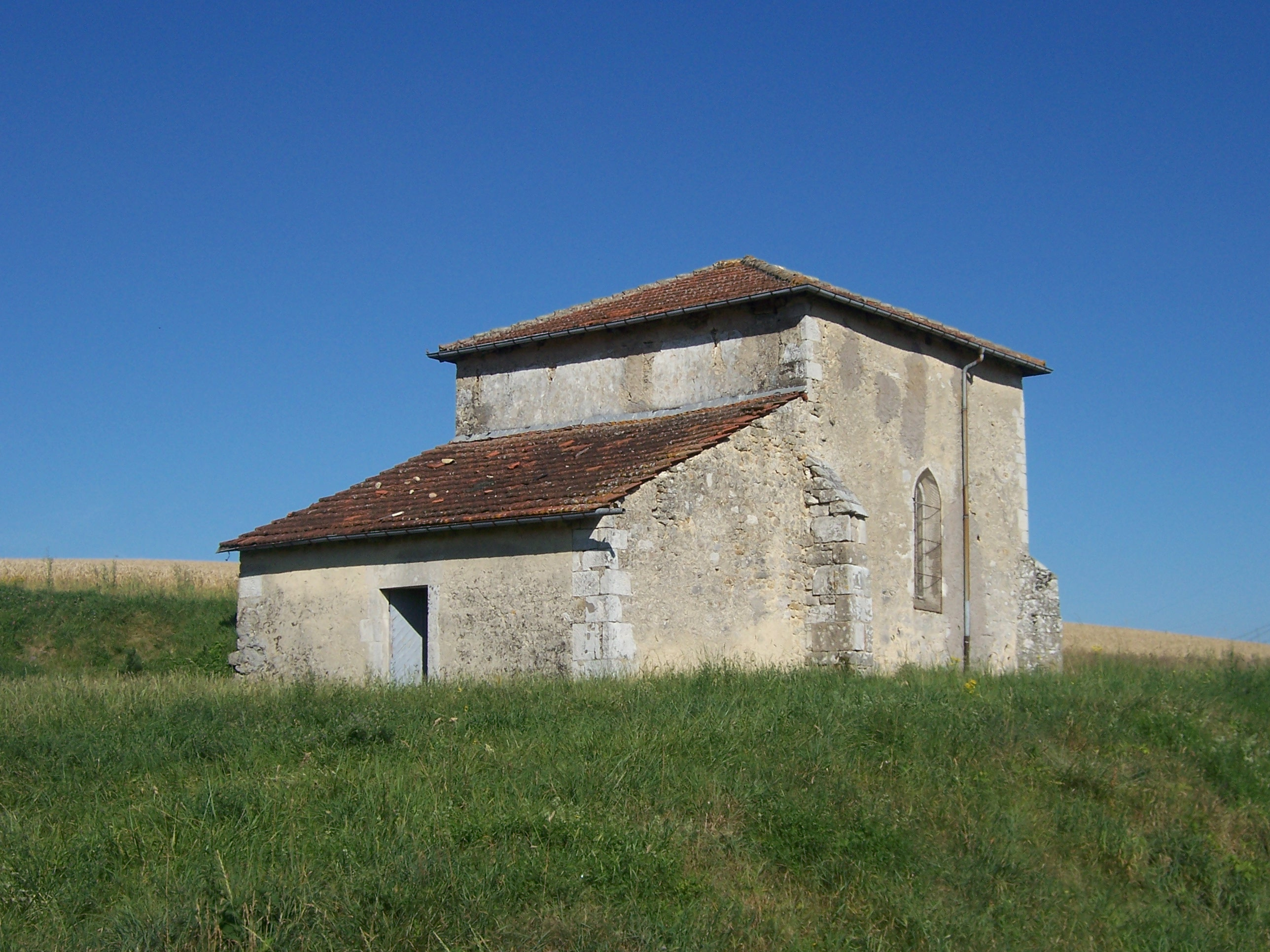
The chapel in 2005

The Chapelle Saint-Gibrien is a historic chapel in Montcourt, Sauvigny, Meuse, France. It was built in the 13th century. It was named after Saint Gibrian. When the hamlet of Moncourt was destroyed in the 15th century, the chapel was guarded by a hermit.

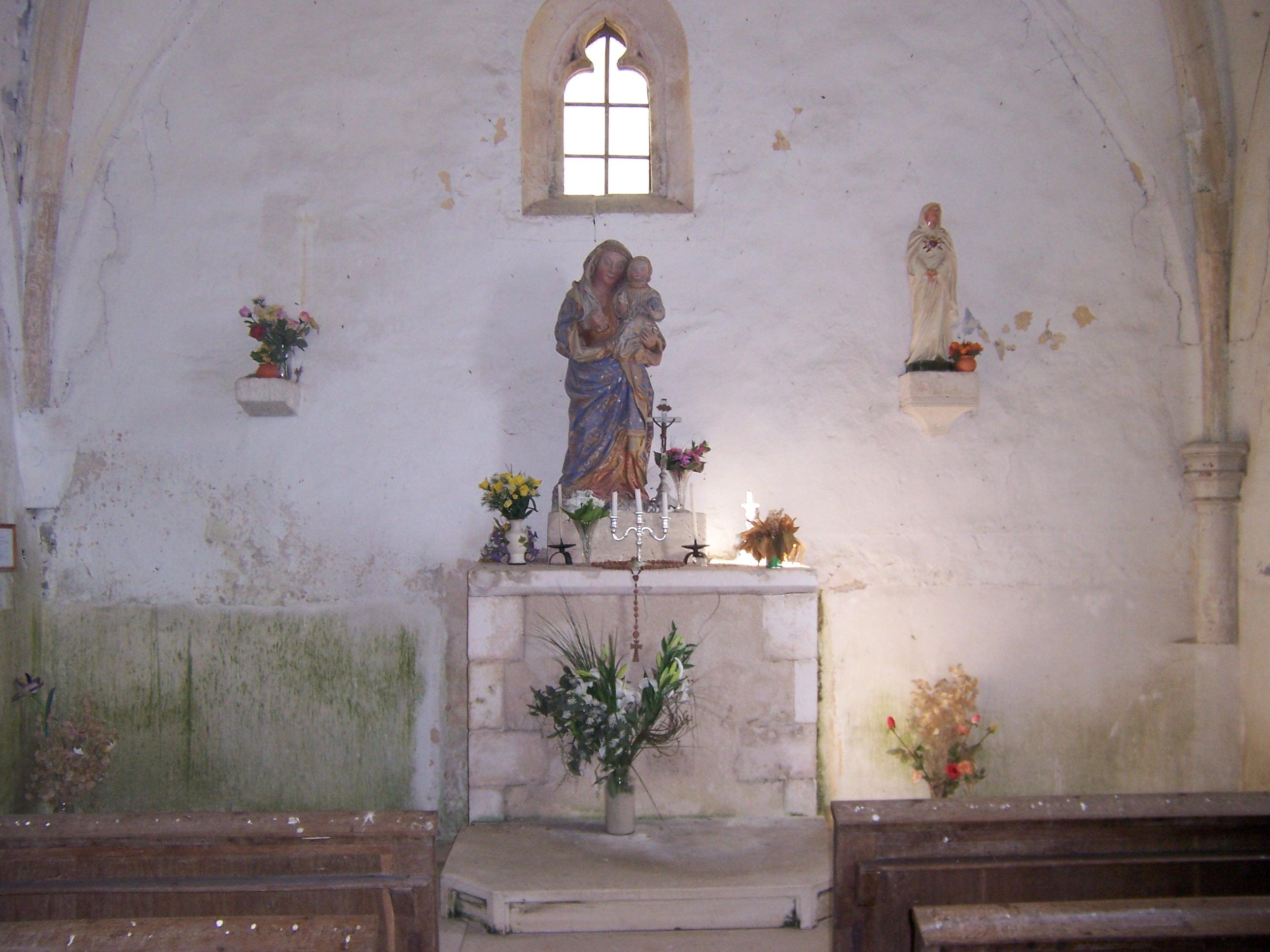
Marian shrine inside the chapel
