= Finnchu =

Irish Saint

Saint Finnchu
- Died: 655

Saint Finnchu (died ca. 655) was an early Irish Saint. He was born in Brigobann, now Brigown, in the county of Cork, Ireland.

== Biography ==
Finnchu was son of Finnlug, a descendant of Eochaidh Muidhmeadhon, and an inhabitant of Cremorne, county of Monaghan, and his second wife Idnait (alternate spellings Iodhnait and Ionait), daughter of Flann, of the Ciannachta of Glen Geimhin. Finnchu was born and baptised at Mog-Ruth (Fermoy) in Munster, by Ailbe (Emly), and "a screpall, that is seven pennies of gold, paid as a baptismal fee". The form of his name given in the Calendar of Oengus is Chua, to which Finn (fair) being added makes Chua-finn, and by transposition Finnchua.

Finnchu was placed with Cumusgach, King of Teffia (in Westmeath and Longford), with whom he remained seven years. At the end of that time Comgall of Bangor (county of Down) obtained leave to educate the child as an ecclesiastic at Bangor. Here he distinguished himself by his courage in bearding the king of Ulaidh, who had insisted on grazing his horses on the lands of the monastery. Nine years later Comgall died, and Finnchu succeeded him as abbot, though he does not appear in the regular lists.

Seven years afterwards he was expelled from Bangor and the whole of Ulaidh, "because of the scarcity of land". He then returned to Munster, where the King of Cashel allowed him to choose a place of residence. Finnchu said: "I must not settle in any place save where my bell will answer me without the help of man", From Cashel he proceeded to the territory of Fermoy, and on the morrow his bell answered him at Fán Muilt (the wether's slope). As this was the queen's home farm, he would have been evicted had he not consented to pay rent. After this Finnchu "marked out the place and arranged his enclosure, and covered his houses, and allotted lands to his households".

Conang, king of the Déisi, came to him, and Finnchu gave him, "as a soul-friend's jewel, his own place in heaven". Then, in order to obtain a place in heaven instead of that which he had given away, he suspended himself by the armpits from hooks in the roof of his cell, so that "his head did not touch the roof, nor his feet the floor". Thenceforth the place was called Bri gobann (Smith's Hill), now Mitchelstown, from the skill shown by the smiths who manufactured the hooks. During seven years he continued to practise this self-mortification until he was visited by St. Ronan Finn with an urgent request for help from the King of Meath, who was distressed by the inroads of British pirates. After much persuasion he accompanied St. Ronan to Tara. On the night of his arrival an inroad took place, and by Finnchu's advice, "all, both laymen and clerics, turned right-handwise and marched against the intruders", with the result that they slew them, burnt their ships, and made a mound of their garments.

At this time, dissensions having arisen between the two wives of Nuadu, King of Leinster, he sent off his favourite wife to Munster "on the safeguard of Finnchua of Sliabh Cua", Arrived near Brigown the saint desired she should not come any further until her child was born, for at that time "neither wives nor women used to come to his church".

On the birth of the child he was baptised by Finnchu, and named Fintan. In a war which ensued between the King of Leinster and the kinsmen of his neglected wife, Finnchu was successful in obtaining the victory for the king. Fintan was with him, and when the king begged that the boy might be left with him, Finnchu consenting gave him "his choice between the life of a layman and that of a cleric". Having chosen the latter the land was bestowed on him, from which he was afterwards known as St. Fintan of Cluainednech. The St. Fintan (d. 634) generally known by this title was the son of Tulchan, but it appears from his Life that there were four of the name at Cluain-ednech.

Returning to Munster, Finnchu was next called to repel an attack from the north, the queen of Ulaidh having instigated her husband to invade Munster to provide territory for her sons. The king of Munster was then living at Dun Ochair Maige (the fort on the brink of the Maige), now Bruree, in the county of Limerick, and when he and his consort beheld "the splendid banners floating in the air, and the tents of royal speckled satin pitched on the hill", they sent for Finnchu, who had promised, if occasion required, to come, "with the Cenn Cathach [head battler], even his own crozier". After vainly trying to make peace, he "marched in the van of the army with the Cenn Cathach in his hand, and then passed right-handwise round the host", For the complete victory which followed the king awarded "a cow from every enclosure from Cnoc Brenain to Dairinis of Emly, and a milch cow to the cleric carrying his crozier in battle".

Ciar Cuircech, nephew of the King of Kerry, having been sent adrift on account of suspected treason, had been taken by pirates, and was retained by them as guide, and for three autumns they harried Kerry, and carried off the corn. The king sent for his relative, Finnchu (the Ciarraige and Finnchu's mother being both of the seed of Ebir). The saint came to the rescue, and "his wrath arose against the maurauders, and the howling and rending of a hound possessed him on that day, wherefore the name of Finnchu [fair hound] clave to him". Ciar was spared by Finnchu, who took him away, and placed him in the territory since called from him Kerrycurrihy, in the county of Cork.

The last warlike adventure in which Finnchu was engaged was the repelling an invasion of the Clanna Neill. The people of Munster, who were then without an overking, elected Cairbre Cromm, a man of royal descent, who was at this time "in waste places hunting wild swine and deer". He consented to lead them on condition that Finnchu accompanied him. On coming in sight of the enemies' camp the Munster men "flinch from the fight in horror of the Clanna Neill", but stirred by the warning of Finnchu that not a homestead would be left to them if they did not fight, they gained the victory. Cairbre Cromm was then made king of Munster, but being dissatisfied with his appearance, as "his skin was scabrous", he besought Finnchu to bestow a goodly form on him, and the saint "obtained from God his choice of form for him". His shape and colour were then changed, so that he was afterwards Cairbre the Fair.

After this Finnchu made a vow that he would not henceforth be the cause of any battles. He gave his blessing to the rulers of Munster, and they promised to pay the firstlings of cows, sheep, and swine to him and his successors, together with an alms 'from every nose in Fermoy', Then he went to his own place, and thence it is said to Rome, for he was penitent for the battles and deeds he had done for love of brotherhood.

== Family ==
Finnchu's father was called Finnlug. Finnlug's first wife, Coemell, was of the Cianmachta of Glen Geimhin. After a married life of thirty years Coemell died, and Finnlug married Idnait, daughter of Flann, also of the Ciannachta. Soon after he was expelled from Ulster with his followers and made his way to Munster. The king, Aengus Mac Nadfraoich, granted him land in the province of Mog-Ruth (Fermoy).

== Assessment ==
Finnchu is associated in Oengus with two foreign saints, Mammes and Cassian. Little of a religious character appears in the present life, but in Oengus he is said to have been "a flame against guilty men", and that "he proclaimed Jesus".

Finnchu's religion appears to have chiefly consisted in ascetic practices of an extreme character. He was supposed to lie the first night in the same grave with every corpse buried in his church. In an Irish stanza current in the north of the county of Cork he is associated with Molagga, Colman of Cloyne, and Declan, all very early saints, and he is termed "Finnchu the ascetic".

The anachronisms in this life are more formidable than usual, but may possibly be explained by the habit of using the name of a well-known king for the reigning sovereign, as in the case of Pharaoh and Caesar. The year of Finnchu's death is not on record, but it must have been a long time after he left Bangor, which was in 608. His day is 25 November.
