= Olcán =

Saint Olcán
- Born: 5th century (fl.); Drumbolcan, Rasharkin or Armoy, County Antrim (traditional)
- Residence: Armoy, County Antrim
- Died: Cranfield Church, County Antrim (traditional burial site)
- Venerated in: Ireland
- Feast: 29 June
- Patronage: Armoy, County Antrim
- Influences: Saint Patrick
- Major works: Founded monastery in Armoy

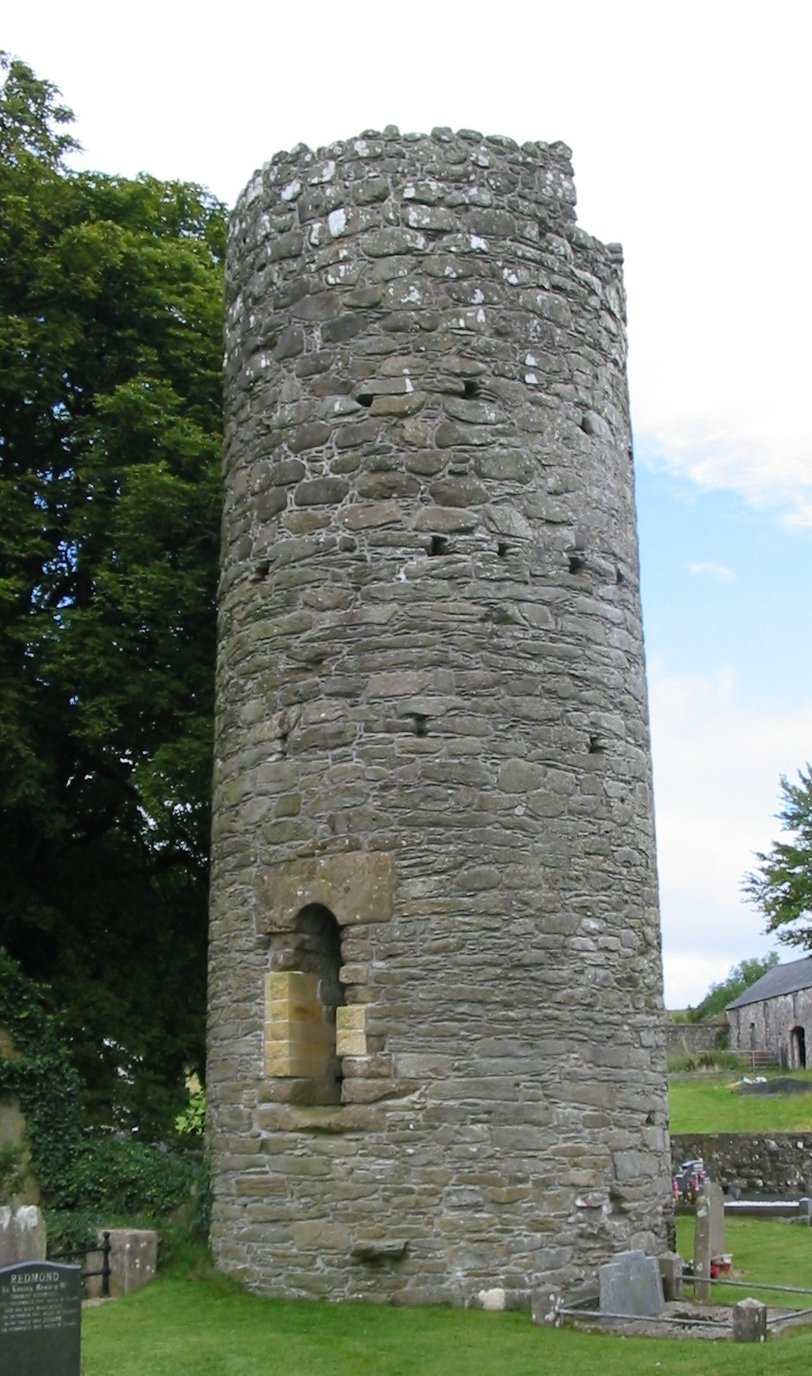
Armoy round tower County Antrim

Olcán (fl. 5th century) is the name of an early Irish saint of the Dál Riata, disciple of St Patrick, founder and bishop of the monastery in Armoy in northeast County Antrim, Northern Ireland.

== Life ==
The hill at Drumbolcan, Rasharkin, is said to be the site where St Olcan was discovered as a newborn baby. However, it has also been said that St Olcan was discovered as a baby in the area of what is now Armoy, where he would eventually found his church. Olcan's birth had occurred after his mother, who had come from over the sea, had died and he lay with her body for seven days before he was discovered by St Patrick. Olcán was baptised by St Patrick. In a 16th-century manuscript titled Martyrology of Salisbury, the claim is made that Olcan's mother was St. Patrick's sister. St Olcan was sent to France and returned to Ireland to become the first Christian bishop in Ireland. Olcán was consecrated Bishop around 474, when St Patrick himself was long established in Armagh. He was ordained at Dunseverick Castle on the North Coast by St. Patrick, who then sent Olcán to study in Gaul.

== Olcán and the Dál Riata ==
Olcán's church in Armoy lay in territory controlled by the Dál Riata, while neighbouring territories were controlled by other ruling dynasties: the southern and western parts of what is now County Antrim and west County Down by the Cruithni, and west County Down by the Dál Fiatach.

In the 7th century, Tírechán relates that Patrick had granted a share of the prized relics of St Peter and Paul (and further saints) to Olcán, indicating how much Patrick and his community expected of Olcán and their alliance with the Dál Riata. However, the fortunes of the Dál Riata in Ireland were adversely affected, while their future rather lay in Scotland, notably in Argyll. As a consequence of losing such political support, Olcán's church were prone to dispossession. The Tripartite Life tells that the lands attached to Armoy were seized and regranted to the saints Mac Nisse of Connor and Senán "of Inis Cathaig" (probably for Senán of Láthrach Briúin).

He is strongly historically and devotionally linked to County Antrim. There are the remains of a round tower on the edge of the Armoy village.

== Olcán's Well ==
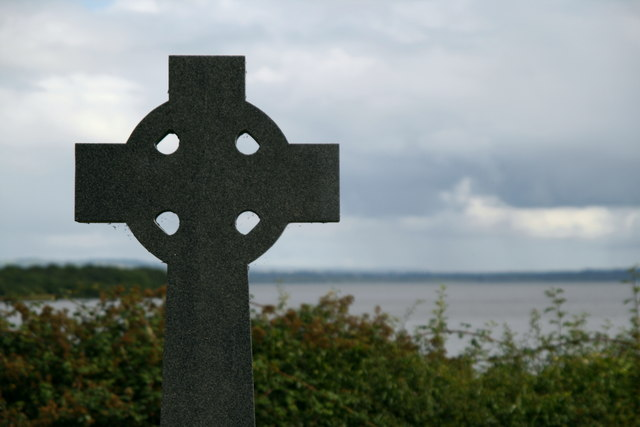
Cranfield Church, Lough Neagh

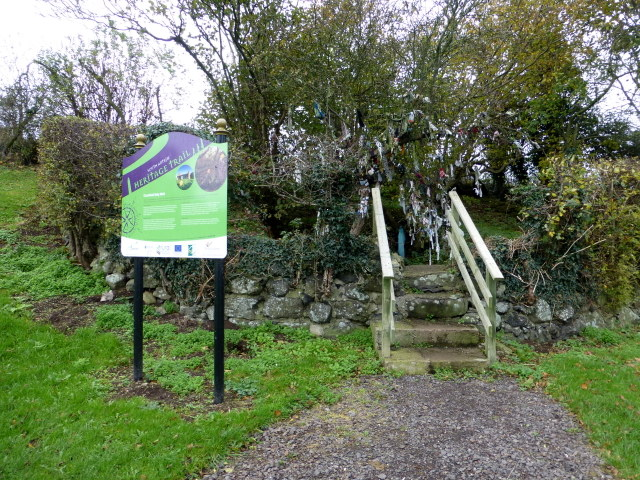
Saint Olcán's Well

The ruins of Cranfield Church, a 13th-century Irish church which lies on the northern shore of Lough Neagh at Churchtown Point, Cranfield, County Antrim, carries a tradition of belief that Olcán blessed his well with healing properties. Olcán was reputedly buried at Cranfield Church in earth brought from Rome.

Within the well are gypsum crystals, known locally as ‘amber pebbles’, which were also thought to have healing properties. It was believed that they protected women in childbirth; fishermen from drowning; and homes from fire and burglary. Emigrants leaving for America in the 19th century thought that swallowing pebbles would provide them with a safe passage across the Atlantic Ocean. It was widely held that the well would overflow on 29 June and the amber pebbles would rise to the surface on that day.

The healing tradition of the well has carried on to present times. Afflicted areas of the body are bathed with a rag dipped in the well, followed by prayers and finally, the rag is tied to one of the trees; the belief is that as the rag disintegrates the affliction will disappear. The trees are full of ribbons, pieces of string, and strips of material.

=== The Stations ===
Throughout Ireland, there are still a limited number of places where "stations" or "patterns" are held to the present day, one of these being Lough Derg. This is a very ancient form of devotion and was a major event at Cranfield until it died out in the first half of the 1800s. In its heyday, the stations at Cranfield would have attracted hundreds if not thousands of pilgrims from the lough shore area of Antrim, Londonderry and Tyrone. The practice could be carried out anytime between May Eve and St Olcan's Feast Day on June 29.

The person performing the station collected seven ordinary small stones with which to count. Then, kneeling at the door of the ruined church the pilgrim said the Our Father, Hail Mary and the Creed. He then walked slowly (usually barefoot) clockwise round the church saying the Rosary. Arriving back at the door he dropped a pebble. These slow rounds of the church continued, a pebble being dropped each time the pilgrim passed the door until he had completed seven rounds. The same practice was carried out round the well seven times with a pebble being dropped each time. Upon completing this the pilgrim drew some water from the well to bathe themselves with. This procedure could be carried out on three consecutive days or all twenty-one rounds of the Church and Well respectively could be carried out on the same day.

== Legacy ==
The former St Olcan's High School, which was named in his honour, merged with St Malachy's High School, Antrim to form St. Benedict's High School, is in Randalstown, County Antrim.
