= Latiaran =

Irish saint

Latiaran or Lateerin is a legendary Irish saint, associated with a sacred well in the county of Cork, and usually described as one of three sisters. She appears in local folklore but not in any official calendar of saints, and may be influenced by pre-Christian mythology. (Note: Latiaran is identified as a goddess by one non-scholarly Wiccan source.)

== History ==
The meaning of Latiaran's name is unknown. "Latiaran Day," celebrated on or around July 25, is associated with the beginning of harvest.

Latiaran's sacred well is located in Cullen in County Cork, next to a ruined church. Next to the well is a whitethorn tree supposedly planted by Latiaran. A heart-shaped stone in the graveyard is supposed to be either the site of a legend or her gravestone. Latiaran Day involved festivities around the well.

== Family ==
According to legend, Latiaran was the youngest of three sisters, all nuns. Some variants of the legend claim that they came from another country, England or France. The names of her sisters vary by location.

According to Duhallow legend, Latiaran's sisters were Lasair (Flame) and Inghean Bhuidhe (the Yellow-haired Girl). Lasair lived in Kilmeen, Inghean Bhuide at Dromtarriff. As Latiaran's feast day was considered the beginning of harvest and Inghean Bhuide's feast day on May 6 was the beginning of summer, Máire MacNeill suggests that Lasair was associated with the beginning of springtime and that they were originally nuns whose legends gained elements of pagan myths.

Some stories also include brothers, Saint John of Mushera or Saint Berihert of Tullylease.

In stories from County Kerry, one of the sisters is instead named Crobh Dearg (Red Claw). Her well was located near the Paps of Anu. A legend runs that the three sisters – Latiaran at Cullen, Crobh Dearg at the City Well, and a third sister at Dromtarriff – all vanished into the ground, causing wells to spring up at the sites of their disappearance.

Saint Gobnait is also sometimes attributed as one of the three sisters, sometimes under the name Abby. Some scholars have compared the three sisters to triple deities.

== Legend ==
Legends claim that Latiaran and her sisters and brothers began living at Cullen, but the others traveled away to other locations. In one story, after moving away, the sisters were unable to visit often because of the thick forest between them, so angels made a road for them.

Latiaran's main legend is that every day she would leave her cell to fetch a seed of fire from the blacksmith and carry it back in her apron. One day the blacksmith complimented her feet. As she admired her own feet, her apron caught fire, but it did not burn her. According to Máire MacNeill, there are several alternate endings. In one, Latiaran was punished for her vanity by sinking into the ground where the heart-shaped stone is, and reemerged in her cell. She never came out again in order to avoid causing anyone sin. In other versions, she cursed the blacksmith and no forge has worked in the village ever since. A poem version, "The Romance of Lateeran," is attributed to the Irish poet James Clarence Mangan, although its authorship is debated.

According to one source collected by the Irish Folklore Commission from Raheen in County Kerry, both "Lotearan" and "Crobh-Dhearg" had the power to carry live coals of fire in their aprons for long distances without burning anything.
