= Abran =

6th century Irish hermit

Saint Abran
- Hometown: Brittany
- Feast: 8 May

Saint Abran (Breton for 'Abraham'), was a 6th-century Irish hermit in Brittany.

== Life ==
Abran was born in Ireland and was a brother of Gibrian. Abran and Gibrain traveled to Brittany with their siblings. The five brothers and three sisters chose a life of devotion to God in consecrated religious life. Abran lived in a hermitage on the Marne River, which had been given to him by Saint Remigius.

Abran and his siblings are all considered saints for their positive Christian influence upon the Breton people.

Saint Abran's feast day is 8 May on the Western Rite Orthodox and Roman Catholic Church calendars.

== See also ==
- Christian monasticism
- Desert Fathers
- Julien Maunoir, apostle of Brittany

== Sources ==
- Latin Saints of the Orthodox Patriarchate of Rome
