= Gibrian =

Irish saint

Saint Gibrian
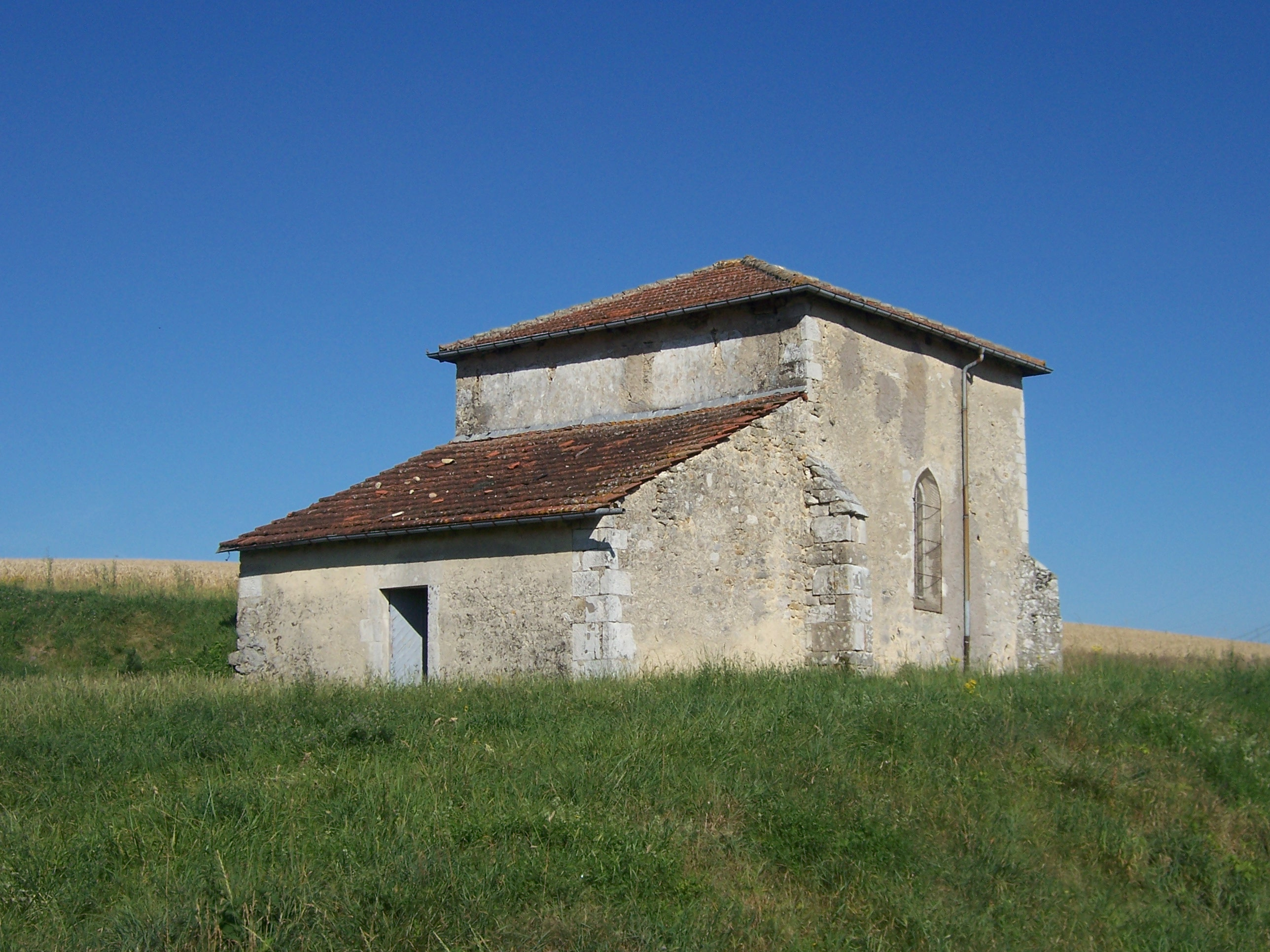
- The Chapelle Saint-Gibrien in Sauvigny, France
- Born: 5th century Ireland
- Died: 509; Châlons-en-Champagne
- Feast: 8 May

Saint Gibrian (or Gybrian, Gobrian; died 509) was an Irish saint associated with Reims and the Marne region.

== Life ==
Gibrian's story appears in the fourth book of the Historia Remensis ecclesiae ("History of the church of Reims"), which was written by Flodoard in the tenth century. Gibrian is mentioned as one of a group of siblings from Ireland who were received by St Remigius at Reims, the seat of his diocese, and given permission to settle in the Marne region. They are said to number seven brothers, Gibrian, Helan, Tressan, German, Veran, Abran, and Petran, and three sisters, Francla, Portia, and Promptia. Gibrian chose for himself a spot near Châlons-sur-Marne in what is now the commune of Saint-Gibrien, which derives its name from the saint.

Gibrian died in 509 and a small chapel was built to mark his grave. Flodoard further writes that Normans destroyed the chapel in the ninth century, but that the body was left intact and following a series of miracles at his tomb, his relics were translated to an altar at Reims. Other versions of this account were later told in Gibrian's and Tressan's Lives, which James Kenney regards as "late and fabulous compositions".

== Cult ==
While the matter of Gibrian's sanctity was not in danger, it was not until the mid-12th century that he began to attract a cult at Reims. This was due to the work of Odo, the abbot of Saint-Remi, who sought to support the new monastery of Chartreux in Champagne. In 1145, Odo had the saint's relics moved to a new shrine at the new monastery. As many as 102 miracles were recorded between April 16 (the day when the relics were translated) and August 24, mostly on Sundays and feast-days. (Note: The text of The Miracles of St Gibrian s given in the Acta Sanctorum, May 1, VII, pp. 618-650.)

There is no sign of a popular cult for a long while afterwards, but it had a revival in 1325, when the saint's reliquary was replaced with a more significant one, the place becoming a place of interest for pilgrims.

== Monks of Ramsgate account ==
The Monks of Ramsgate wrote in their Book of Saints (1921),

GIBRIAN (St.) (May 8)
(5th and 6th cent.) An Irish Saint who, with his five brothers and three sisters, crossed over to France and led a life of penance and contemplation near Chalôns-sur-Marne. His relics were enshrined in Rheims Cathedral, many miracles worked both during his life and after his death attesting his great sanctity.

== Butler's account ==
The hagiographer Alban Butler (1710–1773) wrote in his Lives of the Fathers, Martyrs, and Other Principal Saints under May 8,

St. Gybrian, or Gobrian, of Ireland, Priest He left Ireland in quest of a retreat, and led many years a penitential contemplative life, in a poor cell which he built near the river Marne, in the territory of Challons, where he assembled a small community of fervent servants of God, and another at some distance of holy virgins. He died very old, in the eighth century. Many miraculous cures of sick persons at his tomb, and by his intercession, gave occasion to a chapel being built over his tomb. By an order of Fulk, archbishop of Rheims, his body was translated thither about the year 890. It is deposited there in the great church of the abbey of St. Remigius. See Molanus, Aussaye, and Colgan, in MSS. ad 8 Maij.

== Sources ==
- Butler, Alban (1798), The Lives of the Primitive Fathers, Martyrs, and Other Principal Saints, J. Moir This article incorporates text from this source, which is in the public domain.
- Geary, Patrick J. (1994). Living with the dead in the Middle Ages. Ithaca and London.
- Kenney, James F. (1966) [1929], The sources for the early history of Ireland: ecclesiastical (revised ed.), New York, pp. 183–184
- Sigal, Pierre-André (1969). "Maladie, pèlerinage et guérison au XII^{e} siècle: Les miracles de saint Gibrien à Reims". Annales: Économies, Sociétés, Civilisations (in French). 24 (6): 1522–39. doi:10.3406/ahess.1969.422186. S2CID 161904401.
- St. Augustine's Abbey, Ramsgate (1921). The Book of saints : a dictionary of servants of God canonized by the Catholic Church. London: A. & C. Black, ltd. OCLC 671676136. This article incorporates text from this source, which is in the public domain.
