= Saint Constant =

Irish priest and hermit (d. 777)

Saint Constant was an Irish priest and hermit, who was martyred in 777 AD. His feast is celebrated on 18 November.
