= Eithne and Sodelb =

Irish saints from Leinster

Saint Eithne and Sodelb
- Born: unknown
- Residence: near Swords, in County Dublin
- Died: mid-6th century (or later)
- Venerated in: Catholic Church, Eastern Orthodox Church
- Feast: 29 March
- Patronage: Swords, County Dublin

Eithne and her sister Sodelb are two relatively obscure Irish saints from Leinster who are supposed to have flourished in the 5th century. They are commemorated together in the Irish martyrologies on 29 March, though 2 and 15 January were also marked out as feast-days. The 17th-century scholar John Colgan believed that a Life written for them had been witnessed in c. 1490 by Cathal Óg Mac Maghnusa (d. 1498), whom he regarded as the author of additions to the Félire Óengusso (see below). Although nothing of the kind has come to light, they do make cameo appearances in the Lives of two better-known 6/7th-century saints, Áedan and Moling, both bishops of Ferns.

Ever since their first appearances in the two earliest Irish martyrologies, the Martyrology of Tallaght and Félire Óengusso (early 8th century), the sisters are typically referred to as the daughters of Baite or Baithe. They appear anonymously by that description in the Félire Óengusso, while a late commentator to the text, often identified as Cathal Óg Mac Maghnusa, names them Eithne and Sodelb.

As Colgan already noted, the Genealogies of the Saints of Ireland describe them as daughters of Cairbre, king of Leinster, son of Cormac, son of Ailill, son of Dunlong (etc.), and sisters to one Cumania. The Life of St Áedan of Ferns, on the other hand, makes them daughters of Cairbre's son and successor Áed. Based on the entry for Cairbre's death in 546 in the Annals of the Four Masters, Colgan dates their floruit to the mid-6th century or later.

Colgan proposes that the name Baite must either refer to their (grand)father Cairbre son of Cormac or represent the Irish noun baide denoting divine affection or charity rather than any personal name or epithet. This designation he explains refers to the miraculous act of piety for which they were chiefly remembered, namely their nurturing of the infant Christ. The commentary to the Félire states that they had a vision in which they "used to nurture Christ [...] and Christ used to come in the shape of a babe", so that he was lovingly cradled in their bosom and kissed (in sinu earum et osculabantur eum, et ille babtizauit eas et si apostoli praedicauerint illis tamen plus ab ipso acceperunt fidem quam ab illis).

The church or hermitage of the two sisters is identified by the commentator of the Félire as Tech ingen mBóiti "House of the Baite's daughters" near Swords, i.e. in the barony of Nethercross (County Dublin), which the Martyrology of Cashel locates in Fingal, on the plain of Brega. According to the Genealogies, Eithne and Sodelb were (also) venerated at Killnais, the former name of a townland in the same locality.

In one of the legends contained in the Acts of St Moling, Bishop of Ferns, it is told that this venerable saint visited Eithne and her sister.

Saint Eithne is reportedly buried at St Patrick's Church of Ireland Cathedral, Armagh.

== Sources ==
=== Primary sources ===
- Irish calendars:
  - Óengus of Tallaght (1905). Stokes, Whitley (ed.). The Martyrology of Oengus the Culdee. Henry Bradshaw Society. Vol. 29. London. p. 102.
  - Martyrology of Tallaght, ed. Richard Irvine Best and Hugh Jackson Lawlor, The Martyrology of Tallaght. From the Book of Leinster and MS. 5100–4 in the Royal Library. Brussels, 1931.
  - Martyrology of Gorman, ed. and tr. Whitley Stokes, Félire húi Gormáin. The Martyrology of Gorman. London, 1895.
  - Martyrology of Donegal (Mícheál Ó Cléirigh's compilation, 1630), ed. J.H. Todd and W. Reeves and tr. J. O'Donovan, The Martyrology of Donegal. A Calendar of the Saints of Ireland. Dublin, 1864.
  - Martyrology of Drummond, ed. G.H. Forbes. Missale Drummondiense. The ancient Irish missal in the possession of the Baro- ness Willoughby de Eresby, Drummond Castle, Perthshire. Edinburgh, 1882. For the most recent edition, see Pádraig O Riain (ed.), Four Irish Martyrologies: Drummond, Turin, Cashel, York. London, 2003.
- Colgan, John. Acta Sanctorum Hiberniae. Vol. 3. Louvain, 1645. 416 and 785.
- Life of St. Maedoc (Áedan of Ferns)
- Life of St. Moling
- Annals of the Four Masters, ed. John O'Donovan, Annála Rioghachta Éireann. Annals of the Kingdom of Ireland by the Four Masters. 7 vols. Dublin: Royal Irish Academy, 1848–51.

=== Secondary sources ===
- . Based on:
  - O'Curry, Eugene. Lectures on the Manuscript Materials of Ancient Irish History. Dublin, 1860.
  - Todd, "St Patrick." In Celtic Scotland. London, 1864.
  - Skene, W. Ordnance Survey Letters
- O'Hanlon, John. Lives of the Irish Saints. Vol. 3.
- Smith, W. and Wace, H. A Dictionary of Christian Biography, Literature, Sects and Doctrines. Vol. 2.
