= Raoiriú =

Irish missionary

Raoiriú (also Raoiliú, Raoilinn) was an early Irish missionary, c. 500 AD.

Raoiriú founded Teampall Raoileann on the east bank of the River Suck, in Connacht. He was from the province of Connacht—from the Cinel Dobtha tribal region, descendants of whom became the families O'Hanley and MacCoilidh (Cox). He was kinsman to the siblings Saint Berach and Saint Midabaria. He appears to have belonged to the second or third order of Irish saints who evangelised the Irish. He was one of the first Christian missionaries among the eastern Uí Maine.

In the sixth century, King Cairbre Crom of Uí Maine gave Teampall Raoileann to Clonmacnoise. All that remains on the site are grass-covered foundations of a later church built over the original Teampall. It was located in the townland of Ashford in the parish of Creagh.
