= St Benedict's College, Randalstown =

Secondary school in County Antrim, Northern Ireland

Coordinates: 54.750°N 6.310°W

St Benedict’s College, Randalstown
- St Benedict's College, 5 Craigstown Road, Randalstown, Antrim, BT41 2AF; Northern Ireland

Information
- Type: Secondary
- Motto: Guigh agus Foghlaim - Pray and Learn
- Religious affiliation: Roman Catholic
- Established: 2006
- Local authority: Education Authority (North Eastern)
- Principal: Catriona Mc Ateer
- Gender: Male/Female
- Age: 11 to 16
- Enrollment: 382
- Colour
- Website: www.stbenedictscollege.co.uk

St Benedict's College is a secondary school in Randalstown, County Antrim, Northern Ireland. It is an 11-16 Catholic, all-ability, co-educational college which mainly serves families from the parishes of Randalstown and Antrim.

== History ==
The college was formed from the amalgamation of St Malachy's High School, Antrim, and St Olcan's High School in Randalstown, a decision agreed upon in March 2006. The newly combined school was renamed St Benedict's College. St Malachy's High School was subsequently demolished, and a rebuilding programme began on the St Olcan's site to develop new facilities.
