= Colmán of Lann =

Irish abbot and saint

Saint Colmán mac Luacháin

Abbot
- Born: c. 555
- Died: 610/612; Sound of Iona
- Honored in: Eastern Orthodox Church, Roman Catholic Church
- Feast: 17 June/26 December (Catholic), 26 September (Orthodox)

Saint Colmán mac Luacháin (c. 555 - 610/612) was an early Irish abbot, nephew of Saint Columba, founder and patron Saint of Lann.

The name of the saint's foundation, Lann (in full Lann mic Lúacháin), represents the early Irish word lann meaning "(piece of) land, church". The word is attested in at least two further placenames for church sites associated with namesakes of the saint: (1) Lann Elo (Lynally), the church of Colmán Elo; and Lann Mocholmóc, the church of St Mocholmóc, a pet form of the name Colmán.

A Middle Irish Life was written for him in the 12th century, possibly soon after 1122, which is preserved in a single manuscript kept in the Rennes Library in Brittany. According to the Annals of Ulster, 22 March (Holy Wednesday) in 1122 was the day when the saint's shrine was discovered in the burial place of Lann. Kuno Meyer, who edited the Life, suggests that this event may have prompted the composition of the text shortly after 1122 and also argues that there are linguistic grounds for assigning the text to the 12th century. The frequent use of such locational adverbs as sund ("here") seem to indicate that the Life was also written at Lann. Colmán hardly ever appears in sources other than his Lives, two late martyrologies (see below) and a list of Irish homonyms.

Both prose and verse appear to have been written by the same author and there is no indication that the work draws on earlier versions in either Irish or Latin, unlike many other Irish saints' Lives produced about the time. James Carney regards the Life as "so extravagant that it is something approaching a satire", akin to Aislinge Meic Con Glinne. Clichés of the hagiographic genre, such as demonstrations of the saint's authority through pious behaviour and miracle-working, are exaggerated to absurd effect. There is also a modernised version of this Life, known as Betha Colmáin Lainne ("Life of Colmán of Lynn").

Colmán is not included in the Félire Óengusso, even though his Life pretends to cite the work to this effect, but the Martyrologies of Donegal and Martyrology of Gorman give his feastday at 17 June, other sources give his feastday as 26 December, and Orthodox sources give it as 26 September.
