= Mo Ling =

7th century Irish saint

Saint Mo Ling
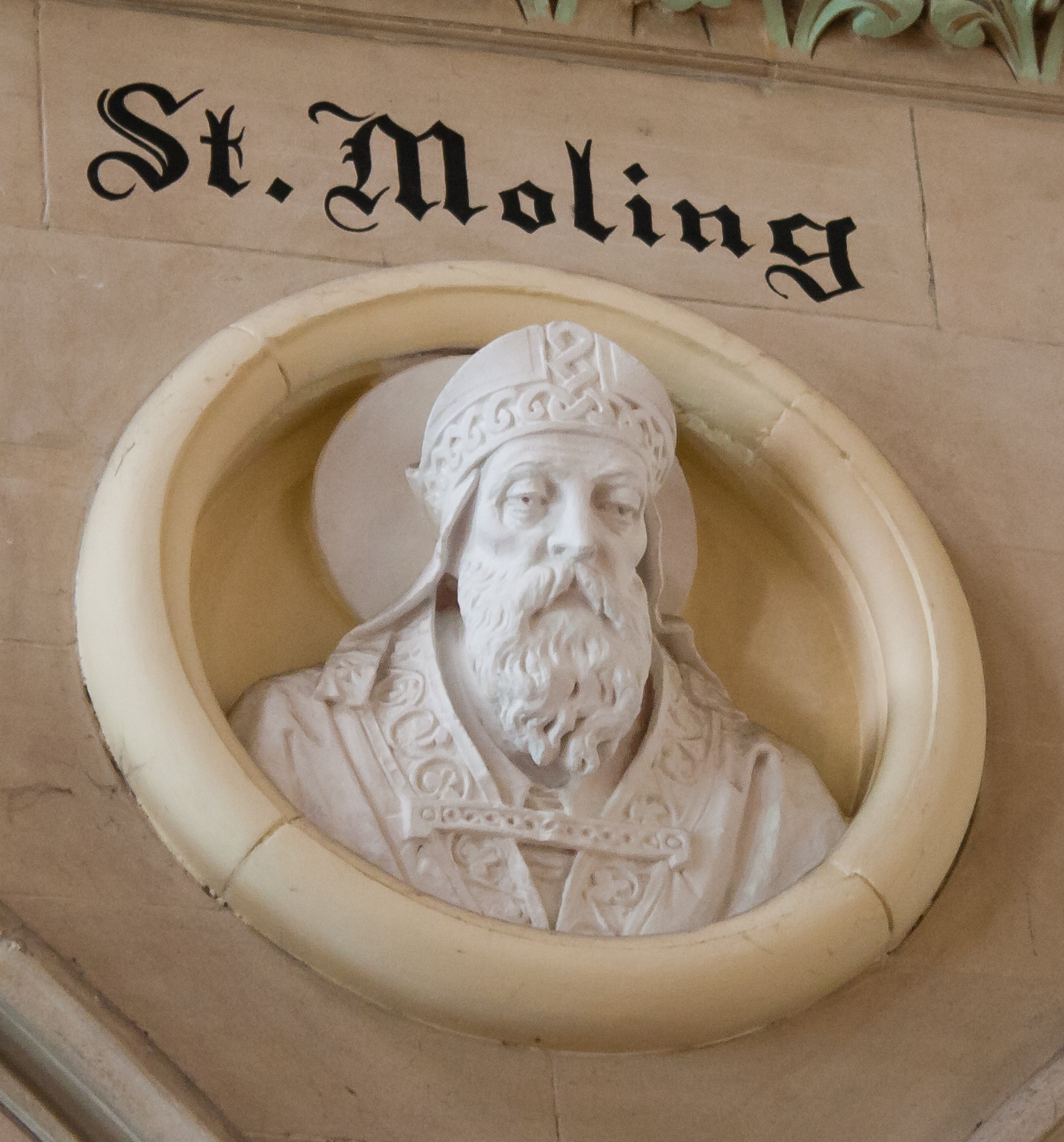
- Relief of St. Mo Ling in the parish church of St Mary and St Michael in New Ross
- Born: 614; Sliabh Luachra, County Kerry
- Died: 697
- Feast: 17 June

Saint Mo Ling (614–697), also named Moling Luachra, was the second Bishop of Ferns in Ireland and has been said to be "one of the four great prophets of Erin". He founded a monastery at St Mullin's, County Carlow. Also in the 7th century, St. Moling is said to have had a church built at Mullennakill in County Kilkenny. His feast day is 17 June. Traditions about him are preserved in two manuscripts, The Birth and Life of St. Moling, and the Borama, both of which expound on how he ended a cattle tributary imposed by the kings of Tara on the kings of Leighin, in retribution for an incident when the son of the king of Leighin went on a cattle raid to Clonfert, killing several princesses in the act.

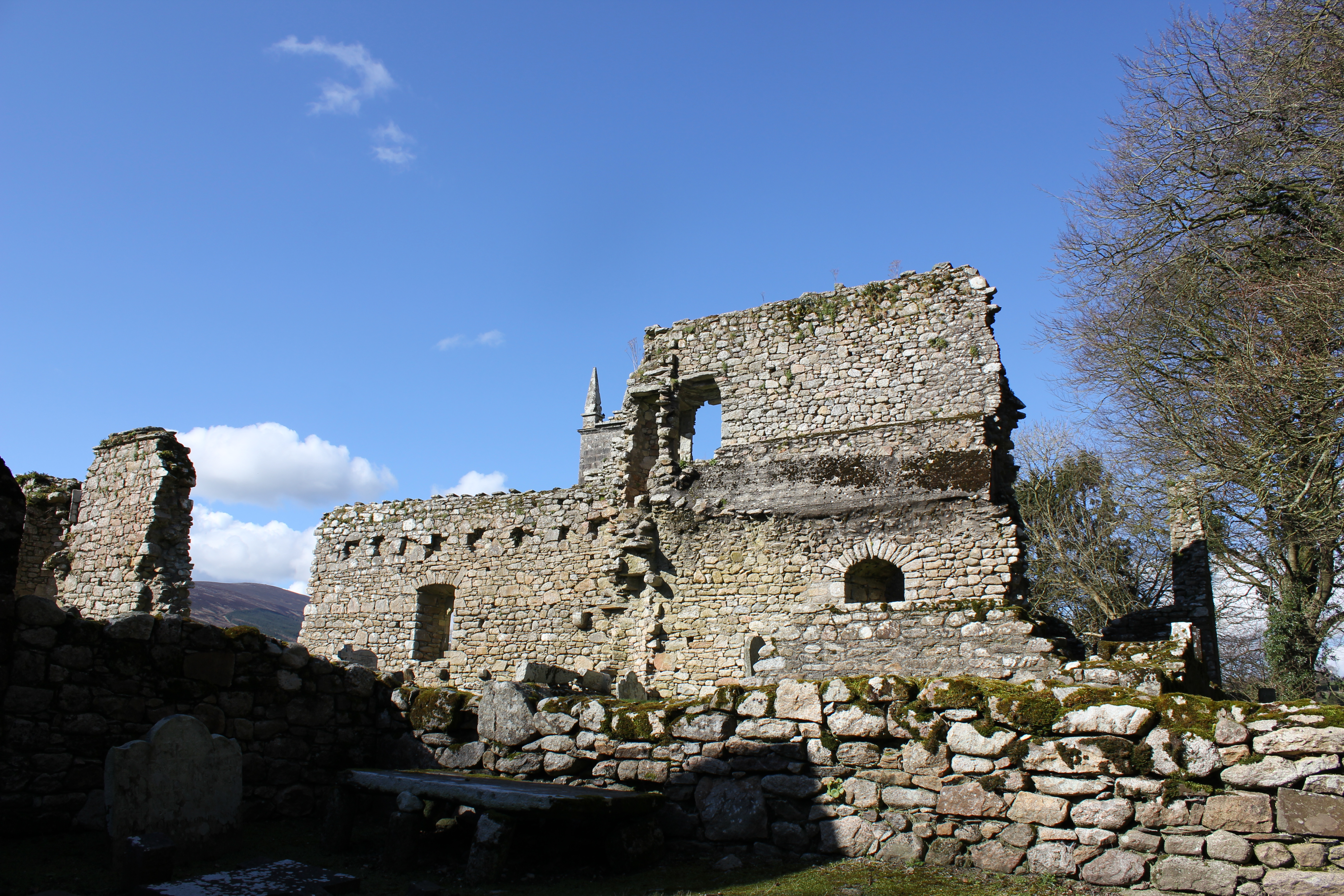
Ruins of the monastery at St Mullin's

== See also ==
- Eithne and Sodelb
