= St Cooey's Wells =

- Interactive map of St Cooey's Wells
- 54.350789°N 5.500573°W
- Type: Holy wells
- Location: Tara Bay, near Portaferry, County Down, Northern Ireland

St Cooey's Wells, also called St Cowey's Wells, is the location of three holy wells, and the remains of a 7th century church; it is located in Tara Bay, near Portaferry, County Down. The site is dedicated to St Cooey (also known as St Cowey or St Cu'Mhaighe), a 7th century Irish saint. No documentary evidence about him exists; his legacy has been preserved through oral tradition.

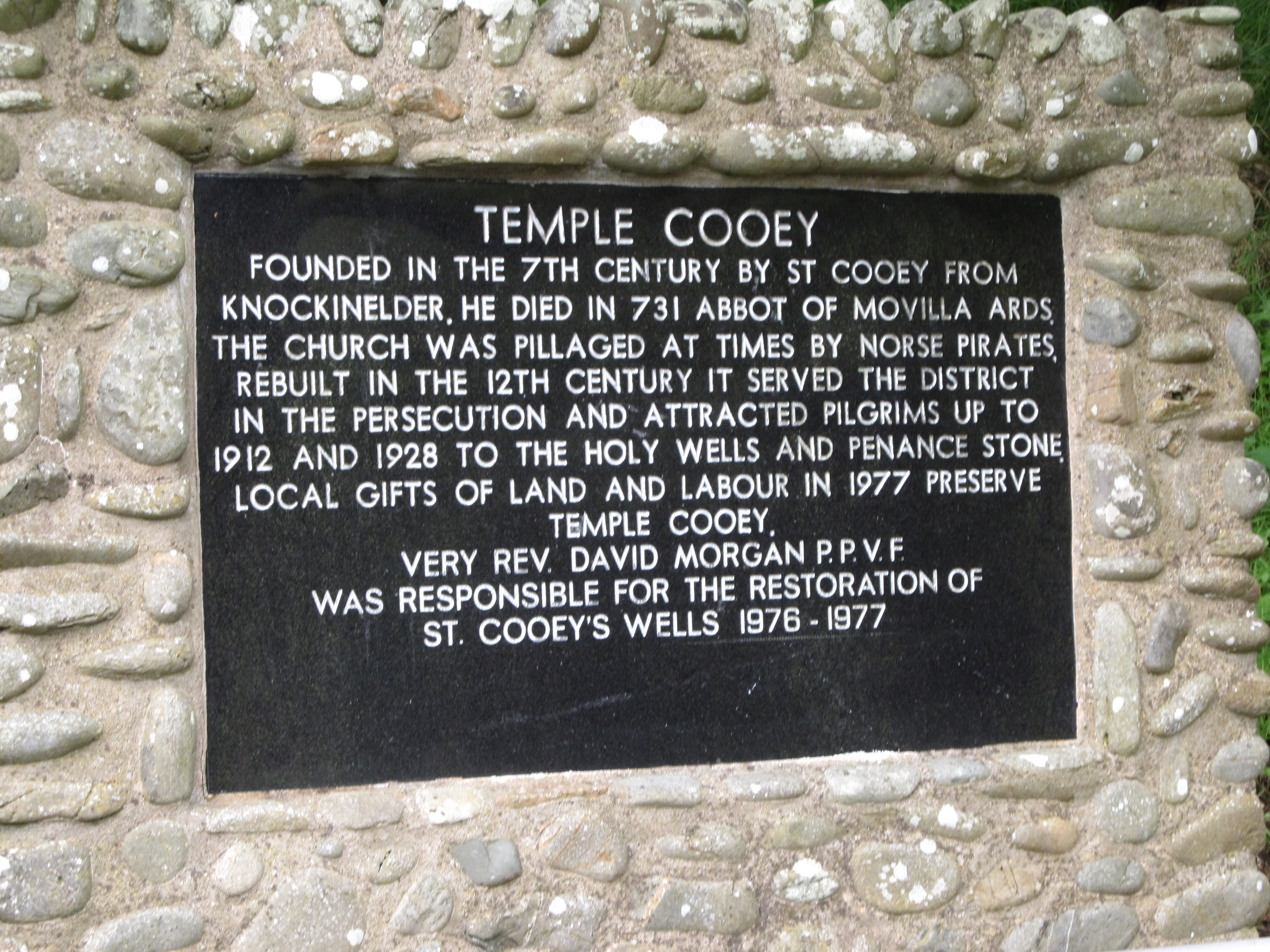
A plaque on a wall near to Templecooey

== History ==
All that remains of St Cooey's 7th century church are the foundation stones. Known as Templecooey, it was once the parish church of Witter. Along with the foundation stones of the church, the gravestones of some early Christians have survived.

Records from as early as the 13th century indicate that St Cooey's Wells was a major pilgrimage site, and the wells continued to attract large numbers of pilgrims up until the 18th century. Today, an annual pilgrimage to the site is organised on the Sunday that is closest to the feast day of St Peter and St Paul(29th June).

== Traditions ==
The water from the wells was traditionally believed to possess healing powers; it was held as being especially good for eye infections. The three separate wells each have a specific use: one is for washing hands, one is for washing eyes, and the third is for drinking. Local legend suggests that water from the wells stays cold even when boiled.

There is large rock on the nearby shore, which is known as the "penitential stone", upon which St Cooey is said to have knelt in penance and prayed. Indents upon the rock's surface are said to mark where St Cooey placed his hands and feet whilst praying.

== Restoration ==
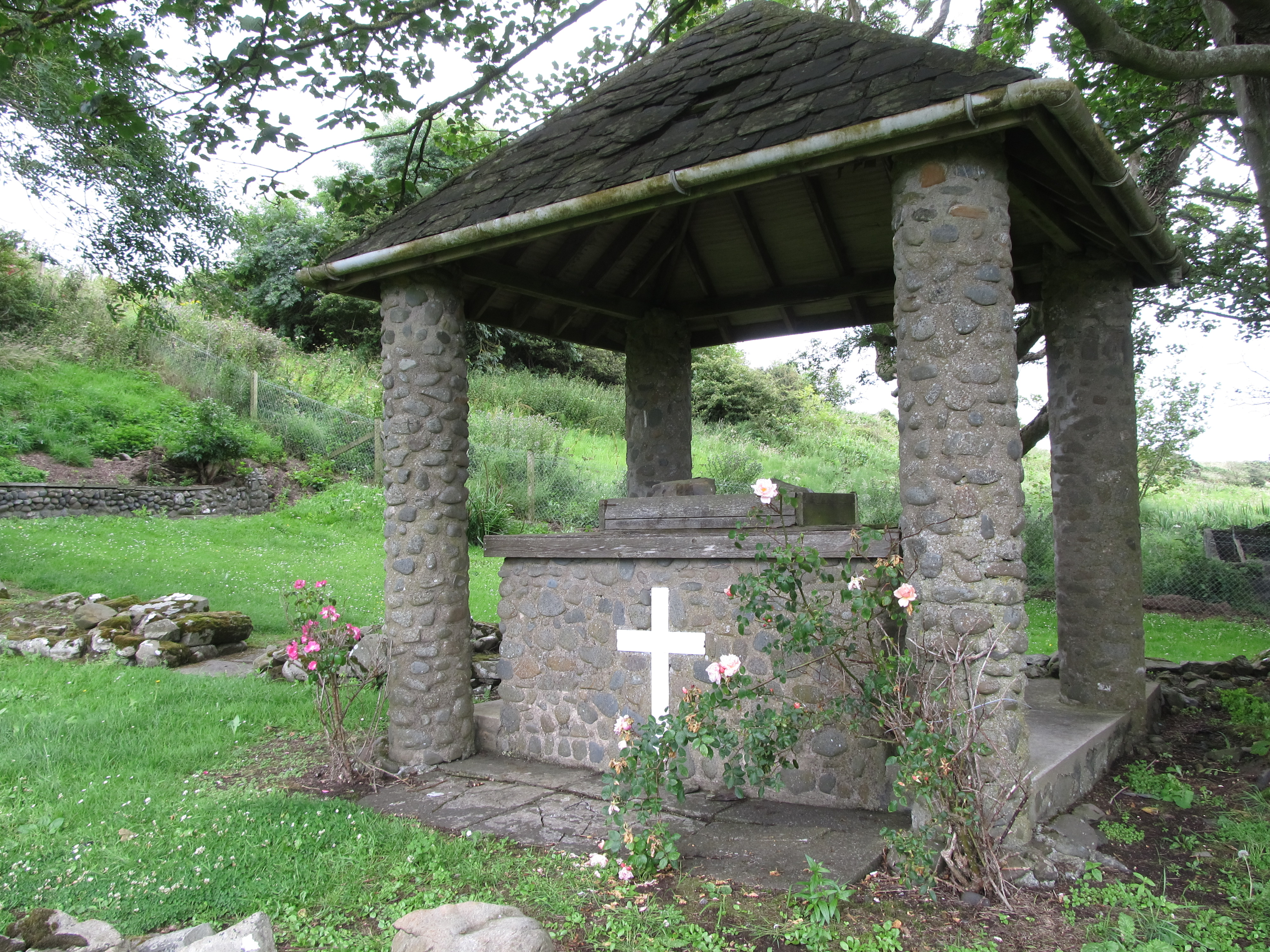
The altar that was installed in the 1970s

By the 1970s, St Cooey's Wells had fallen into disrepair. The local parish restored the site, creating a new car park, and making the wells more easily accessible. A new altar was also built on the location of St Cooey's church. The work was completed in 1978.
