= Béoáed =

Béoáed mac Ocláin (Note: Also known as Aka Beoaedh, Béo Aedh, Aidus vivax, etc.) was bishop of Ardcarne (Ard Carna), County Roscommon.

Béoáed was bishop of Ard Carna in Maigh nAi (now Ardcarne, four miles due east of Boyle, County Roscommon. He is patron saint of Ardcarn, and his feast is celebrated on 8 March.

He was a friend of Saint Caillin.

The poem Imarcaigh sund ar gach saí says of him an díth sin mar t[h]or<t>aind te/that loss was like a fierce loud noise [?].
