= Colmán Elo =

Saint Colmán Elo
- Born: 555
- Died: 26 September 611; Lynally
- Venerated in: Roman Catholicism
- Feast: 26 September

Colmán Elo or Elo Colman (555 – 26 September 611) was born in Glenelly, Ireland, in what is now County Tyrone. He is famed in Irish hagiography.

== Life ==
Colmán was founder and first abbot of Muckamore, and from the fact of being titled as the successor (coarb) of Mac Nisse, is regarded as Bishop of Connor.

Colmán studied under his maternal uncle, St. Columba, who procured for him the site of a monastery now known as Lynally (Lann Elo). Hence his designation of Colmán Elo or in Latinised form, Colmanellus. Subsequently, he founded the Abbey of Muckamore and was appointed Bishop of Connor. He is also known as St. Colmán Macusailni.

Adomnan of Iona in his book The Life of St Columba wrote this about him:

Of the peril of the holy bishop Cólman moccu Sailni in the sea near Rathlin island: Likewise, another day, while St Columba was in his mother church, he suddenly smiled and called out: "Cólman mac Beognai has set sail to come here, and is now in great danger in the surging tides of the whirlpool of Corryvreckan. Sitting in the prow, he lifts up his hands to heaven and blesses the turbulent, terrible seas. Yet the Lord terrifies him in this way, not so that the ship in which he sits should be overwhelmed and wrecked by the waves, but rather to rouse him to pray more fervently that he may sail through the peril and reach us here"

He was the author of Airgitir Crábaid, the earliest surviving example of Old Irish prose.

Colmán is believed to be the real author of a work ascribed to Secundinus, The Hymn of St. Secundinus in praise of Saint Patrick.

He died at Lynally on 26 September 611, the day his feast is celebrated.
