= St Olcan's High School =

Defunct Catholic school in Northern Ireland

Coordinates: 54.751°N 6.310°W

St Olcan's High School (Irish: Ardscoil Naomh Olcán) was a Roman Catholic secondary school in Randalstown, County Antrim, Northern Ireland. The school opened in 1958 within the North Eastern Education and Library Board area.

It was one of two schools which were combined in 2006 to become St Benedict's College. The proposal to amalgamate St Malachy's High School, Antrim and St Olcan's was approved by Angela Smith, the Education Minister for Northern Ireland in March 2006.

The combined school was renamed as St Benedict's College. St Malachy's was demolished and a rebuilding programme began on the St Olcan's site around the same time to accommodate new playing courts for tennis, basketball, and soccer, along with new portacabins for additional classrooms.
