= Mac Nisse of Connor =

Saint Mac Nisse (died 514) was an early Irish saint known as the founder and first bishop-abbot of Connor (Irish: Condere, in what is now Co. Antrim).

== Life ==
Hagiographers say he was son of Fáebrach, son of Erc, who probably belonged to the Dál Fiatach. His mother was Ness.

His story as known is largely legendary He was baptized by Saint Patrick who taught him the psalms. He then took the additional name of Óengus. Mac Nisse was fostered with Patrick's disciple Olcán, Bishop of Armoy. The Tripartite Life of St. Patrick says that as the political support of Dal Riata gained in Scotland, but waned in Ireland, the lands attached to Armoy were seized and regranted to Mac Nisse and Senán "of Inis Cathaig" (probably for Senán of Láthrach Briúin).

Oengus Mac Nisse is thought to have been a hermit near Kells earlier in his life.

There were three Irish abbeys/monasteries by this name.
