= Berchert =

Medieval English saint in Ireland

Saint Berchert (Bericheart, Berechtir of Tulach Leis, Berrihert, Berrahert, Beretchert) (died c.700 or 739 AD) was an early mediaeval English monk, commemorated in several churches in Ireland. He probably came to Ireland as part of the wave of Northumbrian exiles led by Bishop Colman of Lindisfarne following the Synod of Whitby in 664 AD. His feast day is celebrated on 6 December.

A stone slab at Tullylease (County Cork) bears the inscription BERACHTUINE, suggesting Berchert's original Old English name was Berhtwine. Close by the former monastic site of Tullylease is St Berrihert's Well.

St Berrihert's Kyle (otherwise St Berchert's Kyle) in the townland of Ardane (Templeneiry parish, County Tipperary) also appears to bear his name, though may refer to another individual of similar name.
