= Northern Uí Néill =

Name given to several dynasties in north-western medieval Ireland

- Before 425 – 1197
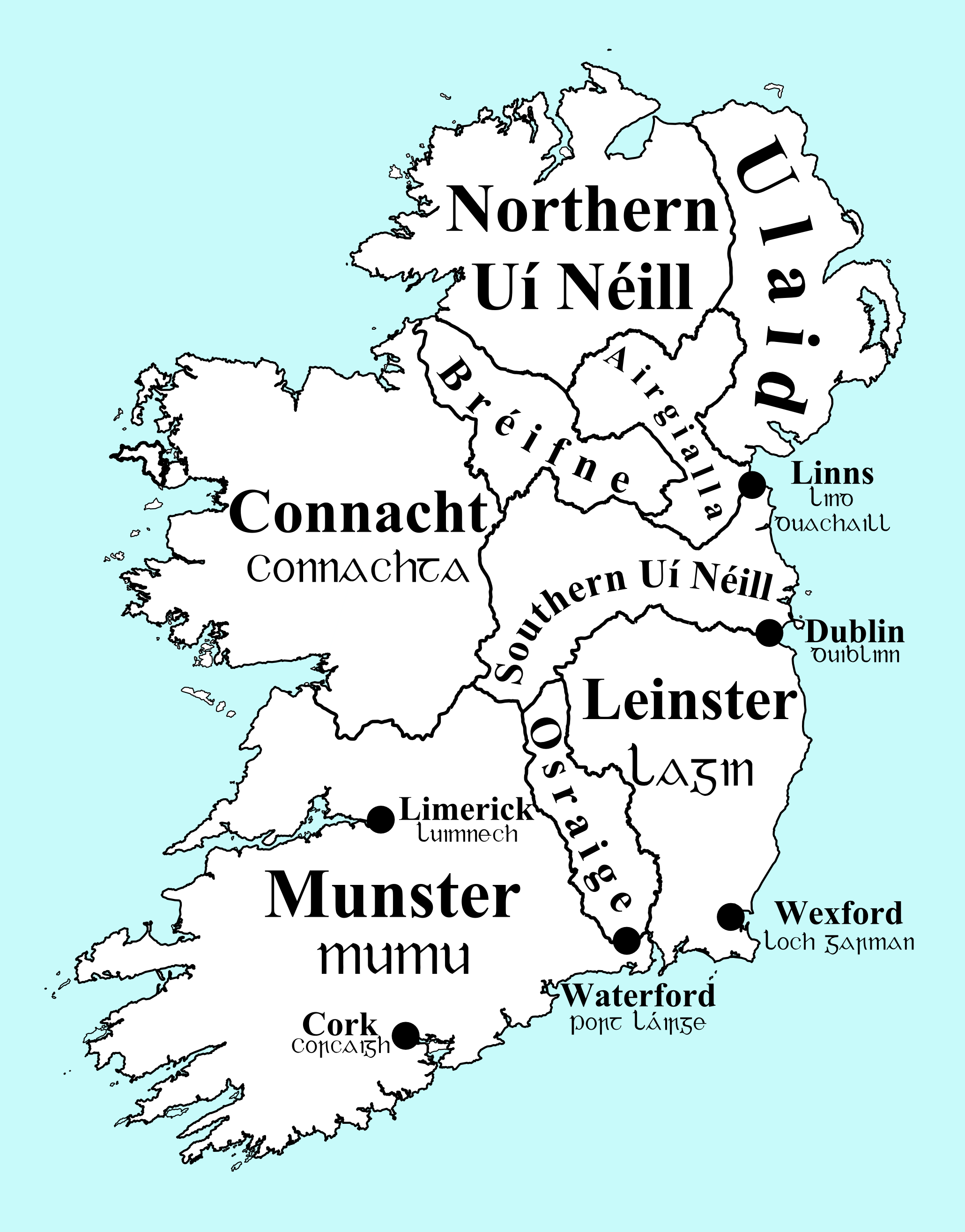
- Map of Ireland's over-kingdoms circa 900 AD.
- Capital: Various
- Common languages: Irish
- Government: Monarchy
- King
  - –465: Eógan mac Néill
  - 1196–1197: Flaithbheartach Ua Maol Doraidh
- History
  - Established: Before 425
  - Disestablished: 1197
Succeeded by
Lordship of Ireland
- Today part of: United Kingdom; Republic of Ireland

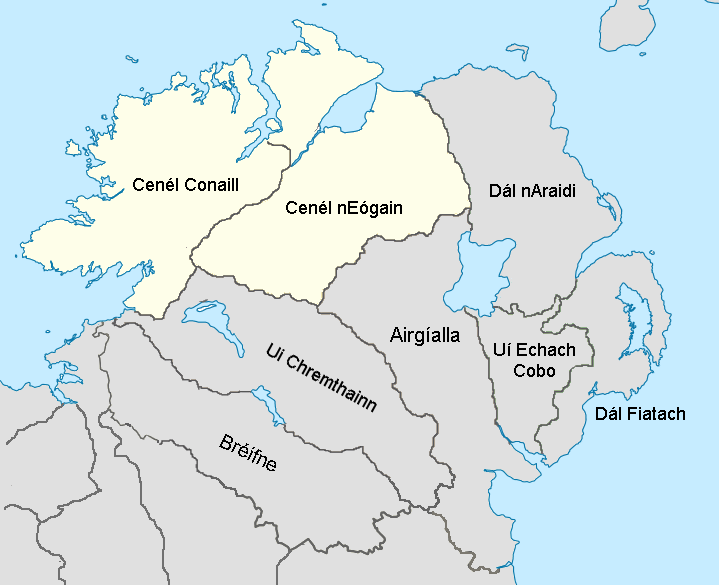
Sub-kingdoms of the Northern Uí Néill and some of its neighbours in the 12th century

The Northern Uí Néill was any of several dynasties in north-western medieval Ireland that claimed descent from a common ancestor, Niall of the Nine Hostages. Other dynasties in central and eastern Ireland who also claimed descent from Niall are termed the Southern Uí Néill (together they are known as the Uí Néill dynasty). The dynasties of the Northern Uí Néill were the Cenél Conaill and Cenél nEógain, named after the two most powerful sons of Niall: Conall and Eógain.

The Northern Uí Néill's over-kingdom in its earliest days was known as In Fochla and In Tuaiscert, both meaning 'the North', and was initially ruled by the Cenél Conaill. After the Cenél nEógain's rise to dominance, it became known as Ailech.

== Mythical origins ==
It is claimed in medieval Irish texts that around 425, three sons of Niall Noígíallach — Eoghan, Conal Gulban, and Enda — along with Erc, a son of Colla Uais, and his grandchildren, invaded north-western Ulster. The result was the vast reduction in the territory of the Ulaid, with the portion of land taken by the three sons of Niall becoming the kingdom of Ailech. This land was divided between the three brothers as such: Conal Gulban took the western portion and named it Tír Chonaill; Eoghan took possession of the main peninsula and named it Inis Eoghain; Enda took nominal possession of land lying south of Ailech, which became known as Magh Enda.

The lack of contemporary evidence has cast doubt on the validity of traditional accounts, with questions raised about whether such an invasion actually took place, as well as whether the invaders even belonged to the Uí Néill at all.

== Origins ==
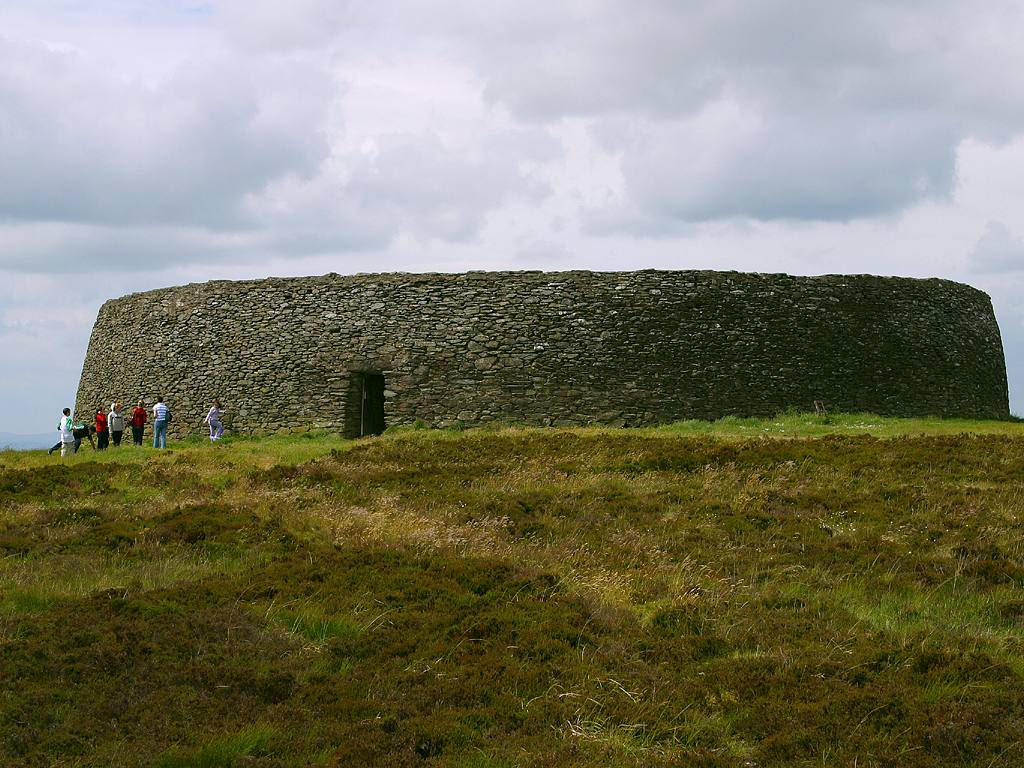
Exterior view of Grianan of Aileach situated in County Donegal, Republic of Ireland; the royal fort of the over-kingdom of the Northern Uí Néill; 55.023386°N 7.428509°W.

Despite the questions over the validity of the traditional accounts, these alleged sons of Niall are collectively known by historians as the Northern Uí Néill.

From the 8th century onwards, possibly sponsored by Áed Allán, a Cenél nEógain king of Tara, and Congus, the bishop of Armagh, early Irish historians carefully constructed propaganda to shore up and cement Uí Néill political supremacy along with the ecclesiastical supremacy of Armagh. This possibly involved the ruthless re-writing and doctoring of genealogies, lists of kings, history, and early annals, tracing the current situation as having primacy all the way back into the undocumented 5th century.

In tandem, about a dozen peoples became designated within what was called Uí Néill in Tuaiscirt, of which the Cenél Conaill and Cenél nEógain were the most dominant.

By the 13th century, the Cenél Conaill had come to dominance over the original territory of the Northern Uí Néill in County Donegal, and sponsored their own history, which incorporated elements from earlier historical revisions. Known as the Eachtra Conaill Gulbain, 'The otherworld adventures of Conall Gulban', it details how sons of Niall Noígiallach, the eponymous ancestor of the Uí Néill dynasties, came forth from Connacht, and invaded the north-western territory of the Ulaid, conquering it from the indigenous people, the Dál Fiatach. This territory roughly equated to present-day County Donegal in the Republic of Ireland. Here they founded their own over-kingdom and dynasties: the Cenél Conaill and Cenél nEógain,

Detailed analysis of maternal ancestries, placenames, hagiography, archaeology, and saints’ genealogies, has brought the origins of the Cenél Conaill branch of the Northern Uí Néill into question, with it being claimed that they are most likely a branch of the Cruithin, linked to the Uí Echach Coba of Iveagh, and Conaille Muirtheimne. Adding to the confusion over the true origins of the Cenél Conaill and Cenél nEógain, recent DNA analysis of descendants from both branches shows a common ancestor in the north-west of Ireland dating from around 1,730 years ago. Niall Noígiallach has been ruled out by historian Brian Lacey as being this ancestor, providing other possible candidates including: Cana mac Luigdech Lámfhata, Dál Fiatach leader of Sentuatha Ulaid; Echu Doimlén, father of the Three Collas; or perhaps an anonymous Cruithin prince.

== History ==
The over-kingdom of the Northern Uí Néill was known originally as In Fochla, meaning 'the North', with the over-king styled as rí ind Fhochlai, the 'king of the North'. It was divided into several sub-kingdoms, which on their own held dominance over smaller tuatha. The territory of the Cenél Conaill was called Tír Conaill, meaning 'the land of Conall'. The territory Tír Conaill (Anglicised as Tyrconnell) held by the late 16th century, would become the basis for County Donegal. The territory of the Cenél nEógain was called Inis Eógain, meaning "Eógain's island", the name of which survives today as the name of the Inishowen peninsula. Their king was styled as rí Ailig, the 'king of Ailech', with their base being the Grianan of Aileach at the entrance of the Inishowen peninsula. The Cenél Conaill and Cenél nEógain are assumed to have established lordship over their neighbouring local tuatha.

Originally the Cenél Conaill were the dominant branch, and were so from the 6th to late 8th centuries. However throughout the 6th and 7th centuries, they and the Cenél nEógain are claimed to have been vying over dominance of the over-kingdom. In 734, after a challenge from Áed Allán, king of the Cenél nEógain, the Cenél Conaill over-king of the Northern Uí Néill, and the Uí Néill as a whole, Flaithbertach mac Loingsech abdicated. From then onwards the Cenél Conaill's dominance started to wane, and their rulers would never again attain the status of over-king of the Uí Néill. It was from this point that the lengthy rotation of the kingship of Tara between the Cenél nEógain and Clann Cholmáin of the Southern Uí Néill started.

The power of the Cenél Conaill collapsed around the 780s, allowing the Cenél nEógain to advance against them. According to the Annals of Ulster, in 788 the Cenél nEógain as part of a southwards push burned the monastery of Derry, which had been built by the Cenél Conaill in the 6th century. The following year, 789, the battle of Cloítech occurred between the Cenél nEógain, led by Áed Oirdnide, and the Cenél Conaill, for complete control of the Northern Uí Néill. The Cenél nEógain emerged victorious excluding the Cenél Conaill from the over-kingship as well as from Mag nÍtha, the valuable plains south of Greenan Mountain in Inishowen. Following this battle, the Northern Uí Néill over-kingdom became known as "Ailech" instead of "In Fochla" and "In Tuaiscert". The Cenél Conaill were afterwards confined to their sub-kingdom of Tír Conaill.

=== Subjugation of Airgialla ===
The Northern Uí Néill were initially hesitant to test the might of Ulster's more powerful kingdoms such as Airgialla, Ulaid, and even the minor Cianacht; however over the following centuries they would come to conquer and dominate the majority of Ulster. The rate of this expansion has been claimed as equating to a rate of less than 10 miles per century.

The main beneficiary of this was the Cenél nEógain, whose gains came largely at the expense of the over-kingdom of Airgialla in central Ulster, as well as the Ulaid further east. Facing pressure from the Cenél Conaill to the west, the Cenél nEógain advanced from their base in the Inishowen peninsula, crossing over the River Foyle into the present-day counties Londonderry and Tyrone in Northern Ireland. Tyrone derives its name from the Cenél nEógain: Tír nEógain, the "land of Eógan".

Airgialla was a confederation of nine sub-kingdoms, with its name meaning 'hostage-givers' in reference to its subordination. The eponymous ancestor of the Uí Néill was Niall Noigiallach, or 'Niall of the Nine Hostages', and it is suggested that this may be the origin of his nickname.

Originally under the dominance of the Ulaid, Niall Caille, the son of Áed Oirdnide, brought Airgialla under the hegemony of the Northern Uí Néill after defeating the combined forces of the Airgialla and Ulaid at the battle of Leth Cam in 827.

During the 10th century, a branch of the Cenél nEógain known as the Cenél mBinnig had colonised the area around Tulach Óc, or Tullyhogue Fort, the apparent royal inauguration site of the Airgialla. By the 11th century, having taken control of Tulach Óc, the Cenél nEógain had moved their royal seat there from Ailech, likely due to the significance of the site and that it undermined the kingship of their rivals. The first Cenél nEógain king to be inaugurated there was Áed Ua Néill. Despite the Cenél nEógain moving their royal site, Ailech would remain synonymous with them long afterwards.

Airgialla's centre of power was pushed into southern Ulster as a result of Cenél nEógain's expansion.

The Cenél nEógain conquests included:

- The Mac Cathmaíl (McCaul) of the Cenél Feradaig who took Clogher, the capital of western Airgialla.
- The Mac Cana (McCann) of Cenél nÓengussa, who spread into northern County Armagh.
- The Ua Catháin (O'Kane) who conquered Cianacht, the territory of the Ciannachta.
- The Ua Neill (O'Neill) who came to prominence west of Lough Neagh in the lands of the Airgiallan Uí Tuirtre, basing themselves at the ancient site of Tullyhogue Fort (Tulach Óc)
- The sub-kingdom of Uí Fiachrach Arda Strath, which lay to the south of Mag nÍtha, was still ruled by the Airgiallan Ua Crícháin dynasty, however, it became a subject of Ailech. By the 12th century they had expanded southwards into Fir Luírg, in modern-day County Fermanagh.

Southwards the Cenél nEógain had also established the kingdom of Cairpre Dromma Cliab, in modern-day County Sligo.

Despite these gains, the Cenél nEógain suffered some losses. The Ua Dochartaig (O'Doherty) who had come to prominence in Tír Conaill eventually forced the Cenél nEógain out of Inishowen, with the Ua Domnaill (O'Donnell) expelling the Cenél nEógain family Ua Gairmledaig (O'Gormley) of Cenél Moain from Mag nÍtha. Eventually Fír Luirg and Tuatha Ratha came under the dominance of the Mag Uidhir (Maguire) lordship of Fir Manach. Cairpre Dromma Cliab had also been lost, having been conquered by Tigernán Ua Ruairc of the kingdom of Bréifne.

With the expansion of the Cenél nEógain into Airgiallan territory, the church of Armagh, which claimed primacy over Ireland, came under their influence. With Armagh continuing to produce propaganda promoting its own ecclesiastical supremacy, it helped advance the claims of the Cenél nEógain.

=== The Vikings ===
Throughout the 9th century, the coastline of Ailech and the rest of Ulster was subject to Viking raids. During the 850s, Viking disunity allowed the Ulster kings to fight back and inflict overwhelming defeats on the Vikings. This cumulated in 866, when the king of Ailech, Áed Finnliath, managed to clear the Vikings from their strongholds in "the North, both in Cenel Eogain and Dál nAraidi", and won a battle in Lough Foyle on the east coast of Inishowen. This was an important victory as the Vikings largely left Ulster alone for many years afterwards, leaving little imprint on Ulster compared to the rest of Ireland. By the time the Normans arrived in Ulster in the latter 12th century, the Vikings' only settlement of note was "Ulfrek's ford" (modern-day Larne).

=== Grianán of Ailech ===
It has been proposed that the Cenél nEógain occupied the site of Grianán fort, which may have been within Cenél Conaill territory, and as new kings of the over-kingdom, renamed it after their home territory, giving it its present-day name of the Grianán of Ailech. It is usually identified, whether correctly or not, as the capital of the Cenél nEógain from the 6th century, until its destruction in 1101 by Muirchertach Ua Briain, king of Munster.

== Cenél Conaill ==
Below is a chart listing the ancestry of the Cenél Conaill from Niall of the Nine Hostages, which contains figures from oral history until the 8th century when the historical period in Ireland started.

Family of the Cenél Conaill

Niall Noígíallach
Conall Gulban	Eógan mac Néill	Enda
Cenél nEógain	Cenél Enda
Fergus Cennfota	Doi (Cenél nDuach)	Enna Bogaine (Cenél mBogaine)
Ninnid	Melge
Baetan	Brandub
Ninnid Liath mac Ferguso	Brénainn mac Ferguso	Sétna mac Ferguso	Fedilmid mac Ferguso	?
Dauí	Feradach	Baithéne mac Brénaind	Columb	Eoghan	Columb Cille	Garban
Amolgad	Lasrén mac Feradaig	Fiachra	Áed	O'Freel	Sechnasach (Rí Cenél mBogaine
Pipan	Ernán	Ségéne mac Fiachnaí	Tinne
Fáilbe mac Pípáin	Cumméne Find	Rónán
Adomnán

   !        !                                     !
   !     O'Freel                                  !
   !                                              !
   |_______________________________               |______________
   |                     |        |               |             |
   |                     |        |               |             |
   Ainmire, died 569 Colum Lugaid Mael Tuile Bresal, died 644
   Ri of Ireland
   |                              |               |
   |                              |               |
   |                       Cenél Lugdach Dungal, Rí Cenél mBogaine, died 672
   |                              |               |
   |                              |               |______________
   |                            Ronan             |            |
   |                              |               |            |
   |                              |               Sechnasach Dub Diberg, died 703
   |                            Garb              |            |
   |                              |               ?            |
   |                              |               |            Flaithgus, died 732
   |                              |           Forbasach        |
   |                              |       Rí Cenél mBogaine    ?
   |                          Cen Faelad died 722            |
   |                              |                            Rogaillnech, died 815
   |       _______________________|
   |       |                      |
   |       |                      |
   |       Mael Duin Fiaman       | 
   |       |                      |
   |       ?                      ?
   |       |                      |
   |       Airnelach Maenguile    |
   |       |                      |
   |       |                      |
   |       |                      |
   |       |                      |
   |       Cen Faelad         Dochartach
   |       |               (Clann Ua Dochartaig)
   |       |
   |       |____________________________________________
   |       |                                           |
   |       |                                           |
   |       Dalach, 'Dux' Cenél Conaill, died 870.   Bradagain
   |       |                                           |
   |       |                                           |
   |       Eicnecan, Rí Cenél Conaill, died 906.    Baigill
   |       |                                     (Clann Ua Baighill)
   |       |
   |       |_______________________________________________________________________
   |       |   |        |          |                   |                          |
   |       |   |        |          |                   |                          |
   |      two sons    Flann     Adlann             Domnall Mor                Conchobar
   |died 956 & 962.             Abbot of Derry  (Clann Ua Domnaill
   |                            died 950.          Kings of Cenel Conaill after 1270 a.d.)
   |
   |_______________________
   |                  |
   |                  |
   Áed, died 598 Ciaran
   |                  |
   |                  |
   |                  Fiachra, founder of Derry, died 620.
   |
   |__________________________________________________________
   |                      |           |                      |
   |                      |           |                      |
   Domnall, died 642 Conall Cu Mael Cobo, died 615 Cumuscach, died 597
   High King died 704 High King of Ireland    |
   of Ireland                         |____________
   |                                  |            |
   |                                  |            |
   |                                Cellach Conall Cael
   |                                  |  both died 658/664
   |                                  |
   |                             (Clann Ua Gallchobair)
   |
   |
   |_____________________________________________________________________________
   |                      |           |           |                |             !
   |                      |           |           |                |             !
   Oengus, died 650 Conall Colgu Ailill Flannesda       Fergus Fanad
   |                   died 663 died 663 died 666 died 654
   |                                                                             !
   !                                                                             !
   !                                                                             !
   |                                                                             |
   |                                                                    Congal Cenn Magair
   |                                                                  died 710
   |                                                                   High King of Ireland
   |                                                                             !
   |                                                        _____________________|_______
   |                                                        |         |                 |
   |                                                        |         |                 |
   |                                                     Donngal Flann Gohan Conaig
   |                                                   died 731 died 732 died 733
   !                                                            !
   !                                                            !
   |                                                       O'Breslin-Fanat
   Loingsech, died 703
   High King of Ireland
   |
   |_____________________________________________________________________
   |                                |                    |      |      |
   |                                |                    |      |      |
   Flaithbertach, deposed 734.  Fergus, died 707 three other sons, all killed 703
   |
   |_______________________________________________________________________
   |                                                 |                  |
   |                                                 |                  |
   Aed Muinderg, Ri in Tuisceart, died 747.     Loingsech Murchad
   |                                           Rí Cenél Conaill Rí Cenél Conaill
   |_______________ died 754 died 767
   |              |                                                     |
   |              |                                                     |
   Domnall Donnchad Mael Bresail
  died 804 fl. 784 Rí Cenél Conaill
   |                                                                died 767
   |                                                                     |
   Flaithbertach                                                         |
   |                                                                   Oengus
   |                                                                     |
   Canannan                                                              |

(Ua Canannain) Mael Doraid (Ua Maildoraid)

 Rí Cenél Conaill                                                        |
                                                                  _______|_______
                                                                 |               |
                                                                 |               |
                                                             Fogartach       Mael Bresail
                                                         Rí Cenél Conaill  Rí Cenél Conaill
                                                             died 904         died 901

=== Branches, clans, and septs ===
Prominent branches and clans of the Cenél Conaill include the O'Donnells, O'Dohertys, O'Boyles and O'Gallaghers. The most famous descendant of the Cenél Conaill is Saint Columba, who founded the monastery at Derry, and is claimed as being the grandson of Conall Gulban.

== Cenél nEógain ==
Below is a chart listing the ancestry of the Cenél nEógain from Fergal mac Máele Dúin, the first of the lineage to be recorded in historical records.

Family of the Cenél nEógain part 1

Fergal mac Máele Dúin
Áed Allán	Niall Frossach
Máel Dúin	Áed Oirdnide
Murchad	Niall Caille	Máel Dúin
Áed Findliath	Flaithbertach	Murchad
Domnall	Niall Glúndub	Ualgarg	Flaithbertach
(see below)	Aed Ua hUalgairg
Conchobar	Fergal	Flaithbertach	Flann
x	Mael Ruanaid
Murchad Glun re Lar	Mael Sechnaill
Flaithbertach	Tadg	Conn	Niall	Lochlainn
Domnall	Aed	Donnchad

Family of the Cenél nEógain part 2

(see above)
Niall Glúndub
Muirchertach mac Néill	Conaig
Domnall
Flaithbertach	Domnall ua Néill	Fergal
Muiredach	Aed	Muirchertach
Lochlainn	Flaithbertach Ua Néill
Aed
Aed in Macaem Toinlesc; Ua Neill
Aed Meith	Niall Ruad
...	...

style="border-spacing: 2px; border: 1px solid darkgray;"

Kings in italics

=== Branches, clans, and septs ===
Prominent branches and clans of the Cenél nEógain include the O'Neills and MacLaughlins. However, the MacLaughlins' defeat at the hands of the O'Neills in 1241 led to the O'Neills' dominance over the Cenél nEógain.

== See also ==
- Kings of Ailech
- Irish kings
- Irish royal families
- Airgíalla
- Ulaid

== Bibliography ==
- Bardon, Jonathan (2005). A History of Ulster. The Blackstaff Press. ISBN 0-85640-764-X.
- Moody, Theodore William; Martin, Francis X.; Byrne, Francis John, eds. (1984). Northern Ui Neill: Cenel nEogain Kings of Ailech and High Kings 700–1083. A New History of Ireland, volume IX. Clarendon Press. p. 128. ISBN 9780198217459.
- Connolly, S.J., ed. (2007). Oxford Companion to Irish History. Oxford University Press. ISBN 978-0-19-923483-7.
- Cosgrove, Art, ed. (2008). A New History of Ireland, Volume II: Medieval Ireland 1169-1534. Oxford University Press. ISBN 978-019-953970-3.
- Desmond Keenan (2004). The True Origins of Irish Society. Xlibris Corporation. ISBN 9781465318695.
- Duffy, Seán (2014). Brian Boru and the Battle of Clontarf. Gill & Macmillan. ISBN 978-0-7171-6207-9.
- Lacey, Brian (2003). The Grianan of Ailech - a note on its identification.
- Lacey, Brian (2006). Cenel Conaill and the Donegal Kingdoms, AD 500-800. Four Courts Press, Dublin. ISBN 978-1-85182-978-1.
- Schlegel, Donald M. (2002). Reweaving the Tapestry of Ancient Ulster. Clogher Record.
- Gleeson, Patrick (16 June 2017). "Luigne Breg and the origins of the Uí Néill". Proceedings of the Royal Irish Academy: Archaeology, Culture, History, Literature. 117C: 65–99. doi:10.3318/priac.2017.117.04. S2CID 164412459.
