= Fergno Britt mac Faílbi =

Fourth abbot of Iona

Fergnae or Fergno Britt mac Faílbi was the fourth abbot of Iona (605–623). Fergnae was the first abbot of Iona to have come from outside Saint Columba's generation. Moreover, unlike his predecessors, he was not from the Cenél Conaill, the kin-group to which Columba belonged and he may also have been British and a bishop. Adomnán, in his Vita Columbae, says that he was 'a young man of good ability' and records that he witnessed one of Columba's miracles. Fergnae died in 623, and was succeeded by Ségéne.

== Bibliography ==
- Sharpe, Richard, Adomnán of Iona: Life of St. Columba (London, 1995)

Preceded by Lasrén	Abbot of Iona; 605–623	Succeeded by Ségéne
