= Cumméne Find =

7th-century Irish abbot and hagiographer

Cumméne Find (Latinised, Cummeneus Albus, Cumméne "the White", died 669) was the seventh abbot of Iona (657–669), succeeding Suibne moccu Fir Thrí.

== Life ==
Cumméne Find was a kinsman of Columba from the royal dynasty of the Cenél Conaill. He was the nephew of a previous abbot, Ségéne mac Fiachnaí and great-nephew of Lasrén. He visited Ireland in 661.

Finan of Lindisfarne died in 661, and Cumméne Find sent Colmán to succeed him as the third abbot. It was during Cumméne's abbacy that the Northumbrians decided against adopting the Gaelic dating of Easter at the Synod of Whitby in 664, resulting in the loss of control of the Ionan offshoot Gaelic church at Lindisfarne. In 664, the last Gaelic abbot/bishop of Lindisfarne, Colmán, resigned his post and returned to Iona, bringing with him the relics of Aidan of Lindisfarne.

It was during Cumméne's abbacy that the Book of Durrow was first produced, although this probably happened at Durrow itself, rather than Iona. Cumméne is known to have visited Ireland in 663, perhaps on a tour of daughter houses.

He is known to have written a Vita of Columba, "De uirtutibus sancti Columbae ("On the Virtues of Saint Columba"). It is often thought to have been an important source for the Life of Columba by Adomnán. The text was later inserted into the Schaffhausen manuscript of Adomnán's Vita Columbae for political reasons in the script of the early eighth century.

He died on 24 February 669. His feast-day is given in the martyrologies as 24 February.

== Bibliography ==
- Sharpe, Richard, Adomnán of Iona: Life of St. Columba, (London, 1995)

Preceded by Suibne	Abbot of Iona; 657–669	Succeeded by Failbe
