= Arculf Map of Jerusalem =

2nd-oldest map of Jerusalem

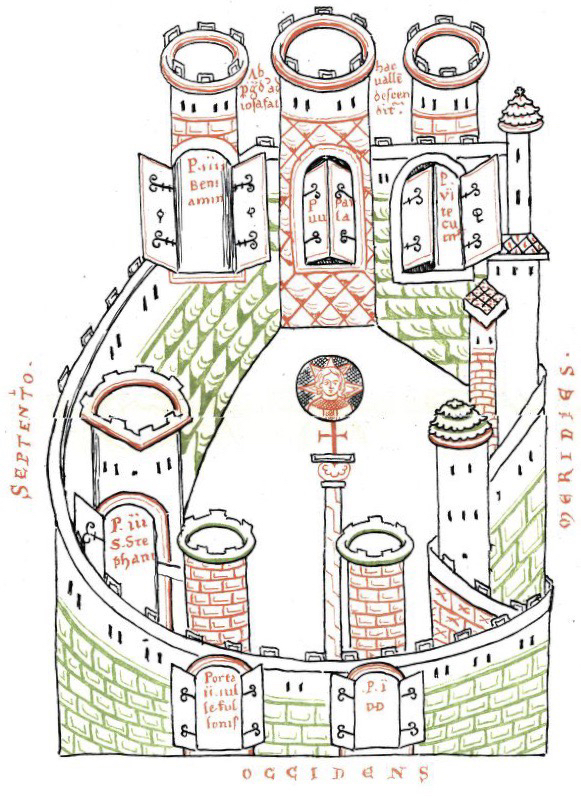
The Arculf Map of Jerusalem

The Arculf Map of Jerusalem is an ancient ground plan map of the city of Jerusalem which was published in manuscripts of the first book of De Locis Sanctis by Arculf via Adomnán, dated to 680 CE. Not all the known manuscripts of the text include the maps and plans. The earliest known manuscript showing the map dates from the ninth century, two centuries after Arculf's journey.

It was the oldest known map of Jerusalem prior to the discovery of the Madaba Map.

== Description ==
The map shows relevant Christian sites in relation to each other.

Arculf spent nine months in Jerusalem before transmitting the story of his travels to Adomnán, for the benefit of other pilgrims. Adomnán wrote that Arculf had drawn his maps and plans on wax tablets.
