= Baithéne mac Brénaind =

6th-century companion of Columba and second abbot of Iona

Saint Baithéne

Abbot of Iona
- Born: c. 534; Ireland
- Died: c. 596-598; Iona, Scotland
- Venerated in: Roman Catholic Church, Eastern Orthodox Church
- Feast: 9 June

Baithéne mac Brénaind (also known as Saint Baithin and Saint Buadán) was an Irish monk, one of Saint Columba's followers who accompanied him to Scotland around 563, and was the first successor as Abbot of Iona Abbey. The Annals of Tigernach record his birth in 534, and his death was likely between 596 and 598 according also to the Annals of Ulster. Irish genealogical records indicate him to be the "son of Brendan, son of Fergus, son of Conall Gulban, son of Niall Noígiallach", thus being a member of the Cenél Conaill branch of the Northern Uí Néill, as the abbots of Iona Abbey following the death of Columba often were.

Baithéne is still venerated in Ireland, but is most heavily associated with County Donegal in the west of Ulster, where his cult was most active in Taughboyne in East Donegal and Culdaff in Inishowen. Celebrations of the saint in County Donegal are ongoing, and a major celebration of the saint's 1,400th death anniversary was celebrated in the parish of Taughboyne in 2000. Folklore about the saint from Donegal further refers to him using various variants of his name.

There is also evidence of Baithéne being venerated as Saint Bathan and Baodáin in Scotland, as Abbey St Bathans in Berwickshire (south east Scotland) is named after him, as well as several other place names. Another place of his veneration in the Highlands and Islands before the Scottish Reformation was the now ruined 10th-century Celtic Church monastery and Christian pilgrimage site of (Scottish Gaelic: Kilbeathan) at (Scottish Gaelic: Clachan Comar), which was dedicated to St Baithéne, as he is locally believed to have started the Christianisation of Strathglass and the holy well known as (Scottish Gaelic: Sputan Bhain) near Beauly in Glen Cannich.

The earliest source for Baithéne is Adomnán of Iona's Life of Columba (Vita Columbae), in which he is featured as Columba's close companion and successor. Two 12th-13th century lives of Baithéne also survive in the Codex Salmanticensis and Codex Insulensis but are heavily influenced by Adomnán's life.

Baithéne is recorded in the four major Irish martyrologies as sharing his feast day with Columba on 9 June.

== Companion to Columba ==
Baithéne is heavily featured in Adomnán's Vita Columbae, where he is featured as Columba's trusted companion and chosen successor. He is called Columba's alumnus, which has variously been translated as 'foster-son' and 'disciple'.

In one story, there was a very sinful man who came to Iona to request being a monk there, but Columba had foreseen how wicked this man was and said he should not be allowed to come. But when the man came, he said he wanted to see Columba, and Baithéne said that the man should be allowed to do penance and quoted the scriptures. To this, Columba responded that the man had murdered his brother and debauched his mother. When the man finally met Columba, Columba told him that he could do penance by living among the British for twelve years without returning to Ireland, but Columba foretold that he would not fulfill this and instead would return to his sinful ways and head to perdition. And the man did exactly as Columba foretold, going not to Britain but back to Ireland, where he was murdered.

In another story, Baithéne asked Columba to give him a monk to help him go through the psalter and look for mistakes. Columba told him that there was no mistake in the psalter except that the letter I was missing in one place. And they went through the psalter and found that it was just as Columba had said.

Another time, Adomnán mentions that Baithéne once visited the island of Eigg.

Baithéne also features on a list of twelve companions who followed Columba to Iona. The list gives Baithéne an alternative name 'Conin' and it mentions that he had a brother called Cobthach. It has been suggested that these have been fabricated to create a biblical parallel.

== Iona, Tiree, and Hinba ==
Baithéne's reign as abbot was fairly short as Columba died c. 597, and Baithéne's death is recorded as occurring c. 598, aged 66 according to the Annals of Clonmacnoise. No evident sources contemporaneous with Baithéne's abbacy survive.

Baithéne served as prior over a monastery connected to Iona on the island of Tiree. The name of the place where his monastery was located on Tiree was Mag Luinge or Campus Luinge. The monastery was a house for penitents from Iona. Some historians have thought that it may have supplied food to Iona.

Adomnán recorded a story about a voyage he took to the island, when Columba first told a monk who was heading to Tiree that he should not sail directly from Iona to Tiree, because a great whale would frighten him, but his did not listen to his advice and took the direct route, and a huge whale came out of the water and almost destroyed the boat, which terrified those in the boat. When Baithéne departed the following day to Tiree, Columba told him about the whale, and Baithéne responded that both he and the whale were in God's power, to which Columba responded 'Go in peace, your faith in Christ will shield you from danger'. And so Baithéne then took the direct route and the whale came out of the water which terrified all in the boat, except Baithéne, who used his hands to bless the sea and the whale, and the whale then went down into the water.

Another story that Adomnán recorded held that Baithéne and Colmán Elo both approached Columba one time to ask him to pray for a favourable wind on their respective journeys to Tiree and Ireland. Columba said that in the morning the wind would be favourable to travel to Tiree and in the afternoon the Lord would change it to make it favourable to travel to Ireland. And it happened just as Columba said.

Another story that Admonan recorded held that one time Columba encountered an army of demons on Iona, and he fought them with the help of angels, such that the demons fled from Iona. But after they fled, they then went to Tiree and attacked the monks there, including the monastery at Mag Luinge headed by Baithéne. While many in the other monasteries died from diseases, which were caused by the demons, only one monk in Baithéne's monastery died and the rest were protected because of their prayer and fasting.

Baithéne spent time as prior of Hinba.

In one story, Adomnán claimed that Columba went to Hinba and relaxed the penitential rules on one occasion. However, one monk named Neman refused to abide by the relaxation. Columba rebuked him and said 'Neman, Baithéne and I have allowed a relaxation in the diet and you refuse it. But the time will come when in the company of thieves in the forest you will eat the flesh of a stolen mare'. This monk eventually left the monastery and went back into the world, and one day found himself among thieves eating such meat.

| Preceded by Columba | Abbot of Iona; 597–600 | Succeeded by Lasrén |
