= Silnán =

Silnán was a sorcerer in 6th century Ireland or possibly Dal Riata who was described by Adomnan of Iona in his biography of St Columba.

According to Adomnan, when Columba was visiting a rich lay Catholic named Foirtgern who lived on a hill called 'Cainle' (an unknown location to modern-day historians) foresaw the arrival of two people who were in dispute.

Silnán was one of the two, and he was a sorcerer. It is unclear what the dispute was about, but Columba ordered Silnán to use his magic to draw milk from a nearby bull, seemingly in defiance to the bull's God-given gender. Silnán then did so, and retrieved a pail full of milk from the bull.

Columba had ordered him thus, in order to show to all the people that Silnán's sorcery was not actually capable of doing this. Columba then took the pail of milk and blessed it, and the milk straightway turned into blood. Columba thus revealed that the sorcerer had not actually taken milk, but rather had taken blood out of the bull and used his sorcery to mask it, thus showing that Silnán had failed to actually defy the bull's natural gender but had only just seemingly done so at the cost of the animal's health.

The bull was then found to have wasted away to a hideous leanness, but holy water was then sprinkled on it and the bull recovered its health.
