= Life of Columba =

Hagiography of an Irish saint

The Life of Columba (Latin: Vita Columbae) is a hagiography recounting the life of Columba, the founder of Iona Abbey, written a century after Columba's death by Adomnán, one of his successors as Abbot of Iona.

Adomnán (also known as Eunan), served as the ninth Abbot of Iona until his death in 704. James Earle Fraser asserts that Adomnán drew extensively from an existing body of accounts regarding the life of Columba, including a Latin collection entitled De uirtutibus sancti Columbae, composed c. 640 A.D. This earlier work is attributed to Cummene Find, who became the Abbot of Iona and served as the leader of the monastic island community from 656 until his death in 668 or 669 A.D.

While the Vita Columbae often conflicts with contemporaneous accounts of various battles, figures, and dates, it remains the most important surviving work from early medieval Scotland and provides a wealth of knowledge regarding the Picts and other ethnic and political groups from this time period. The Vita also offers a valuable insight into the monastic practices of Iona and the daily life of the early medieval Gaelic monks.

== Background ==
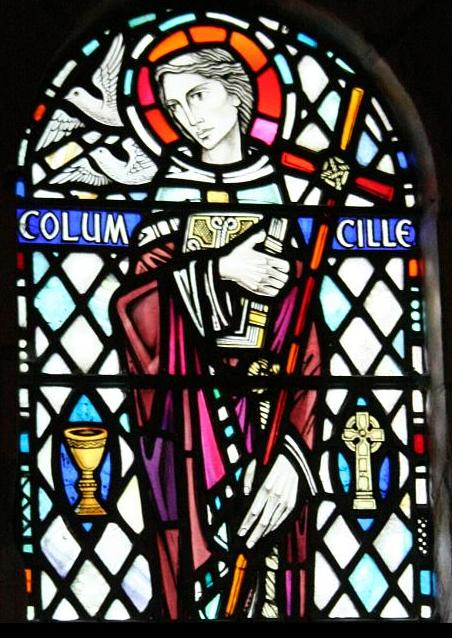
Saint Columba. Stained glass window in Iona Abbey

The Life of Columba is a hagiography written in the style of "saint's lives" narratives that had become widespread throughout medieval Europe. Compiled and drafted by scribes and clergymen, these accounts were written in Latin and served as written collections of the deeds and miracles attributed to the saint, both during his or her life or after death. Columba was acknowledged as a saint, thanks to the vigorous promotion of his memory, within years of his death. This was long before official 'canonization' proceedings ever took place at Rome, so Columba has never actually been canonized by Roman authorities in the way that became common later in the Middle Ages.

It was probably written between 697 and 700. The format borrows to some extent from Sulpicius Severus' Life of Saint Martin of Tours. Adomnán presents Columba as comparable to a hero in Gaelic mythology. One of the motivations for writing the Vita may have been to offer Columba as a model for the monks. The biography is by far the most important surviving work written in early medieval Scotland, and is a vital source for our knowledge of the Picts, as well as a great insight into the life of Iona and the early medieval Gaelic monks.

== Manuscripts ==
The surviving manuscripts include:

- A Generalia 1, Stadtbibliothek Schaffhausen, Switzerland; vellum, probably written before 713, Digitized Edition at E-codices.
- B1 British Library Add MS 35110 (B1), folios 96v-143r, probably written before 1165.
- B2 British Library Cotton MS Tiberius D III (B2), folios 192r-217r, written end of 12th to early 13th century. Due to fire damage in 1731, there are missing illegible portions on every page, and six folios [Book I, ch. 2 (diebus) to 22 (genibus) and 36 (viro) to 49 (omnia quae)] are missing completely.
- B3 British Library Royal MS 8 D IX (B3), folios 1r-70r, written in the fifteenth or early sixteenth century. The first 8 folios, [to I, 3 (haec puro pectore)] are missing.

== Books ==
Instead of relying on chronological order, Adomnán categorises the events recorded in the Vita Columbae into three different books: Columba's Prophecies, Columba's Miracles, and Columba's Angelic Visions.

=== Book one (Of his Prophetic Revelations) ===
In the first book, the author Adomnán lists Columba's prophetic revelations, which come as a result of his ability to view the present and the future simultaneously. Most of the short chapters begin with Columba informing his fellow monks that a person will soon arrive on the island or an event will imminently occur.

In one notable instance, Columba appears in a dream to King Oswald of Northumbria and announces the king's forthcoming victory against the King Catlon (Cadwaladr ap Cadwallon of Gwynedd) in the Battle of Heavenfield. The people of Britain promise to convert to Christianity and receive baptism after the conclusion of the war. This victory signals the re-Christianizing of pagan England, and establishes King Oswald as ruler of the entirety of Britain.

Columba's other prophecies include when he sends a man named Batain off to perform his penance, but then Columba turns to his friends and says Batain will instead return to Scotia and be killed by his enemies. Several of Saint Columba's prophecies reflect the scribal culture in which he was immersed, such as his miraculous knowledge of the missing letter "I” from Baithene's psalter or when he prophecies that an eager man will knock over his inkhorn and spill its contents.

=== Book two (Of his Miraculous Powers) ===
In the second book, Columba performs various miracles such as healing people with diseases, expelling malignant spirits, subduing wild beasts, calming storms, and even returning the dead to life. He also performs agricultural miracles that would hold a special significance to the common people of Ireland and Britain, such as when he casts a demon out of a pail and restores the spilt milk to its container.

The Vita contains a story that has been interpreted as the first reference to the Loch Ness Monster. According to Adomnán, Columba came across a group of Picts burying a man who had been killed by the monster. Columba saves a swimmer from the monster with the sign of the Cross and the imprecation, "Thou shalt go no further, nor touch the man; go back with all speed." The beast flees, terrified, to the amazement of the assembled Picts who glorified Columba's God. Whether or not this incident is true, Adomnán's text specifically states that the monster was swimming in the River Ness – the river flowing from the loch – rather than in Loch Ness itself.

=== Book three (The Visions of Angels) ===
In book three, Adomnán describes different visions of angels associated with the saint, both those that Columba sees and those that are seen by others regarding him. He mentions that, "For indeed after the lapse of many years, ... St. Columba was excommunicated by a certain synod for some pardonable and very trifling reasons, and indeed unjustly" (P.79- 80).

In one of the accounts, Columba, in this period of excommunication, goes to a meeting held against him in Teilte. Brendán, despite all the negative reactions among the seniors toward Columba, kisses him reverently and assures that Columba is the man of God and that he sees holy angels accompanying Columba on his journey through the plain.

In the last chapter, Columba foresees his own death when speaking to his attendant:

This day in the Holy Scriptures is called the Sabbath, which means rest. And this day is indeed a Sabbath to me, for it is the last day of my present laborious life, and on it I rest after the fatigues of my labours; and this night at midnight, which commenceth the solemn Lord's Day, I shall, according to the sayings of Scripture, go the way of our fathers. For already my Lord Jesus Christ deigneth to invite me; and to Him, I say, in the middle of this night shall I depart, at His invitation. For so it hath been revealed to me by the Lord himself.

And when the bell strikes midnight, Columba goes to the church and kneels beside the altar. His attendant witnesses heavenly light in the direction of Columba, and angels join him in his passage to the Lord:

And having given them his holy benediction in this way, he immediately breathed his last. After his soul had left the tabernacle of the body, his face still continued ruddy, and brightened in a wonderful way by his vision of the angels, and that to such a degree that he had the appearance, not so much of one dead, as of one alive and sleeping.

== Bibliography ==
- Adomnan of Iona (1995). Life of St Columba. Penguin Books. ISBN 978-0-14-190741-3.
- Bruce, James (2007), Prophecy, Miracles, Angels & Heavenly Light? The Eschatology, Pneumatology and Missiology of Adomnan's Life of Columbia - Studies in Christian History and Thought, Paternoster, ISBN 9781597527316
- Fraser, James Earle (2009). From Caledonia to Pictland: Scotland to 795. Edinburgh University Press. ISBN 978-0-7486-1232-1.
