= Lasrén mac Feradaig =

Third abbot of Iona

Lasrén (also Laisrén, Laisrán) mac Feradaig or Lasrén of Iona (d. 605) was an Irish monk and the third abbot of Iona (c.600-605), in succession to Baíthéne. Lasrén worked during the abbacy of St Columba and administered the monastery of Durrow for the saint in the years before attaining Iona. Like Baíthéne before him, he was a kinsman of Columba from the royal dynasty of the Cenél Conaill. His father, Feradach meaning 'woodsman', was a cousin of the saint.

Lasrén (meaning flame) first appears in Adomnán's Life of St Columba as one of Columba's close companions as he travelled through Ardnamurchan in Argyll, perhaps in 572. Later, when he had been appointed prior of Columba's monastery at Durrow (Co. Offaly, in the midlands of Ireland), which was probably founded in the 580s or 590s, he is said to have overseen the building works there. Columba, himself at Iona, started to weep, having learned through his visionary power that Lasrén was wearing out the monks as they erected a large building. Suddenly “as if kindled with an inward fire”, Lasrén suspended all labour for the rest of the day, gave the monks a meal and would do the same on similar occasions in the future. For that reason, Columba ceased to weep and blessed Laisrén as “the consoler of the monks” (monachorum consulator). Lasrén appears to have been remembered as a benevolent man, but the story is also likely to have been designed to show that Lasrén was destined for the abbacy of Iona.

The Annals of Ulster record his death in 605. According to the Martyrology of Tallaght, his feast-day was observed on 16 September. The fifth abbot of Iona, Ségéne, was a nephew of Lasrén and the seventh abbot, Cumméne, was a great-nephew.

== Notes ==
Preceded by Baithéne	Abbot of Iona; 600-605	Succeeded by Fergnae
