= Suibhne mac Cuirtri =

Suibne moccu Fir Thrí [Suibne moccu Urthrí, Suibhne I] was the sixth abbot of Iona (652–657). His abbacy is obscure, and he appears not to have been from the same kindred, Cenél Conaill, as Columba and most other early Ionan abbots. His abbacy saw a continuation of the evangelization of England and spread of Gaelic churchmen there, with Diuma becoming the first Bishop of Mercia in 656. He died in 657 and his feast day is 11 January.

== See also ==
- Corca Fhir Trí

Preceded by Ségéne	Abbot of Iona; 652–657	Succeeded by Cumméne
