= Cumméne =

Cumméne, also spelled Cuimín, Cummin, Cumin etc., is an early Irish name (Latinised as Cumianus or Cummianus, Anglicised Cumian or Cummian) and may refer to:

- Cumméne Fota (d. 661/2), Irish abbot, bishop and theologian, author of a paschal letter
- Cumméne Find (died 669), also called Albus, hagiographer and abbot of Iona, attended the Synod of Whitby
- Cumianus (d. c. 736), abbot of Bobbio
- Cuimín of Kilcummin, locally venerated saint
