= Abbot of Iona =

Scottish monastic leaders

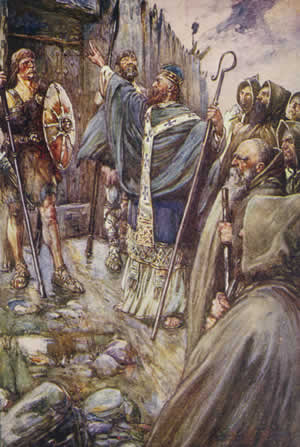
Iona's first abbot, Saint Columba, before the fortress of the Pictish king

The Abbot of Iona was the head of Iona Abbey during the Middle Ages and the leader of the monastic community of Iona, as well as the overlord of scores of monasteries in both Scotland and Ireland, including Durrow, Kells and, until the Synod of Whitby, Lindisfarne. It was one of the most prestigious clerical positions in Dark Age Europe, and was visited by kings and bishops of the Picts, Franks and English. The Ionan abbots also had the status of Comarba of Colum Cille, i.e. the successors of that Saint, Columba.

Iona's position as head of the Columban network (familia) of churches declined over time, with abbots based at Derry, Raphoe, Kells and Dunkeld. In Scotland, the abbots of Dunkeld ruled much of central Scotland in the 11th century, and functioned as some of the most important politicians of northern Britain. One of the abbots, Crínán, married Bethóc ingen Maíl Coluim, the daughter of King Máel Coluim II, and became the progenitor of the so-called House of Dunkeld, which ruled Scotland until the later thirteenth century. Dunkeld became a bishopric, and the monks based at Inchcolm Abbey became Augustinians.

At the beginning of the thirteenth century, the monks of Iona adopted the Benedictine rule. Iona was re-endowed in 1203 by Raghnall mac Somhairle, son of Somerled, king of Argyll and the Isles.

== List of abbots of Iona to 891 ==
Early abbots of Iona
| Incumbent | Until | Citation(s) | Notes |
|---|---|---|---|
| Colum Cille mac Fedelmtheo | Died 9 June 597 | | |
| Baithéne mac Brénaind | Died 9 June 598 | | |
| Lasrén mac Feradaig | Died 16 September 605 | | |
| Fergno Britt mac Faílbi | Died 2 March 623 | | Known primarily as Virgno |
| Ségéne mac Fiachnaí | Died 12 August 652 | | |
| Suibne moccu Fir Thrí | Died 11 January 657 | | |
| Cumméne Find | Died 24 February 669 | | |
| Fáilbe mac Pípáin | Died 22 March 679 | | |
| Adomnán mac Rónáin | Died 23 September 704 | | |
| Conamail mac Faílbi | Deposed(?) 707 | | Died 11 September 710 |
| Dúnchad mac Cinn Fáelad | Deposed(?) June 713 (restored 713 x 716); Died 25 May 717 | | |
| Dorbbéne mac Altaíni | Died 28 October 713 | | Also called Dorbbéne Foto |
| Fáelchú mac Dorbbéni | Deposed/resigned 722 | | Died 724 |
| Fedelmid | Deposed(?) before 722 | | Died 759 |
| Cilléne Fota | Died 726 | | |
| Cilléne Droichtech | Died 752 | | |
| Sléibíne mac Congaile | Resigned before 766 | | Died 767 |
| Suibne | Resigned 771 | | Died 801 |
| Bresal mac Ségéni | Died 801 | | |
| Connachtach | Died 802 | | |
| Cellach mac Congaile | resigned 814 | | Died 815 |
| Diarmait daltae Daigri | Resigned 831 | | Died in or after 831 Blathmac mac Flainn was martyred on Iona in 825. |
| Indrechtach ua Fínnachta | Resigned before 854 | | Died 854 |
| Cellach mac Ailello | Died 865 | | Cellach had been abbot of Kildare since 852 |
| Feradach mac Cormaic | Died 880 | | |
| Flann mac Maíle Dúin | Died 20 April 891 | | |

== List of comarbai Coluim Cille and abbots of Iona, 891–1099 ==
During the abbacies of Diarmait and Indrechtach, almost certainly because of Viking attacks, the relics of Columba were moved to other monastic houses in the Columban familia, such as Kells, Raphoe and Dunkeld. The position of abbot on Iona ceases to have the same significance within the Columban monastic familia, and many comarbai are not based on the island.

Comarbai Coluim Cille to 1099
| Incumbent | Chief monastery | Until | Citation(s) | Notes |
|---|---|---|---|---|
| Máel Brigte mac Tornáin | Iona/Armagh | Died 22 February 927 | | Máel Brigte had been abbot of Armagh from 883, and may not have spent much time on Iona |
| Dubthach mac Dubáin | Raphoe | Died 938 | | |
| Cáenchomrac | Iona | Died 947 | | Was definitely abbot of Iona, but may not have been coarb of Coluim Cille |
| Robartach | Raphoe | Died 954 | | |
| Dub Dúin ua Stepháin | unknown | Died 959 | | |
| Dub Scoile mac Cináeda | unknown | Died 964 | | |
| Mugrón | Iona | Died 980/81 | | Styled "coarb of Colum Cille in Ireland and Scotland" |
| Máel Ciaráin ua Maigne | Iona | Martyred 24 December 986 | | Killed by Vikings |
| Dúnchad Ua Robacháin | Raphoe | Died 989 | | |
| Dub dá Leithe mac Cellaig | unknown | Died June 998 | | Dub dá Leithe had been abbot of Armagh from 965 |
| Máel Brigte mac Rímeda | Iona | Died 1005 | | Was definitely abbot of Iona, but may not have been coarb of Coluim Cille |
| Muiredach mac Crícháin | Raphoe | Resigned 1007 | | Died 1011; Muiredach was also fer léigind of Armagh |
| Ferdomnach | Kells | Died 1008 | | |
| Máel Muire Ua hUchtáin | Kells | Died 1009 | | |
| Flandabra | Iona | Died 1025 | | Styled "coarb of Iona" |
| Máel Eóin Ua Toráin | Derry | Died 1025 | | Styled "coarb of Derry" |
| Máel Muire ua hUchtáin | Kells/Raphoe | Died 1040 | | Máel Muire was abbot of both Kells and Raphoe |
| Murchad mac Flainn ua Máel Sechlainn | Kells (?) | Deposed (?) 1057 | | Murchad was abbot of Conard from 1055, as well as briefly king of Mide in 1073; his most likely Columban holding would be Kells. |
| Robartach mac Ferdomnaig | Kells | Died 1057 | | |
| Gilla Críst Ua Maíl Doraid | unknown | Died 1062 | | Gilla Críst was called "coarb of Colum Cille in Ireland and Scotland". |
| Mac meic Báethéne | Iona | Died 1070 | | |
| Domnall mac Robartaig | Kells | Resigned before 1098 | | |
| Donnchad mac meic Máenaig | Iona | Died 1099 | | |

== List of comarbai Coluim Cille at Kells and Derry ==
None of the following comarbai Coluim Cille are based at Iona, but rather Kells and Derry.

Comarbai Coluim Cille from 1099 to the 1220s
| Incumbent | Chief monastery | Until | Citation(s) | Notes |
|---|---|---|---|---|
| Ferdomnach Ua Clucáin | Kells | Died 1114 | | |
| Máel Brigte mac Rónáin | Kells | Died 1117 | | |
| Conaing Ua Beigléighinn | Kells | Died 1128 | | |
| Gilla Adamnáin Ua Coirthnén | Kells | — | | Gilla Adamnáin was a priest of Durrow who later became abbot of Kells. |
| Gilla Meic Liac mac Diarmata | Derry | Archbishop from 1137 | | Gilla Meic Liac (Gelasius) had been abbot of Derry since 1121, and was consecrated archbishop of Armagh in 1137; he died on 27 March 1174. |
| Muiredach Ua Clucáin | Kells | Died 1154 | | |
| Flaithbertach Ua Brolcháin | Derry | Died 1175 | | |
| Gilla Meic Liac Ua Branáin | Derry | Resigned 1198 | | |
| Gilla Críst Ua Cernaig | Derry | Died 1210 | | |
| Fonachtan Ua Branáin | Derry | Died 1220 | | |
| Flann Ua Brolcháin | Derry | Deposed 1220 | | |
| Muichertach Ua Milliuc | Derry | Died | | |

== List of Benedictine abbots of Iona ==
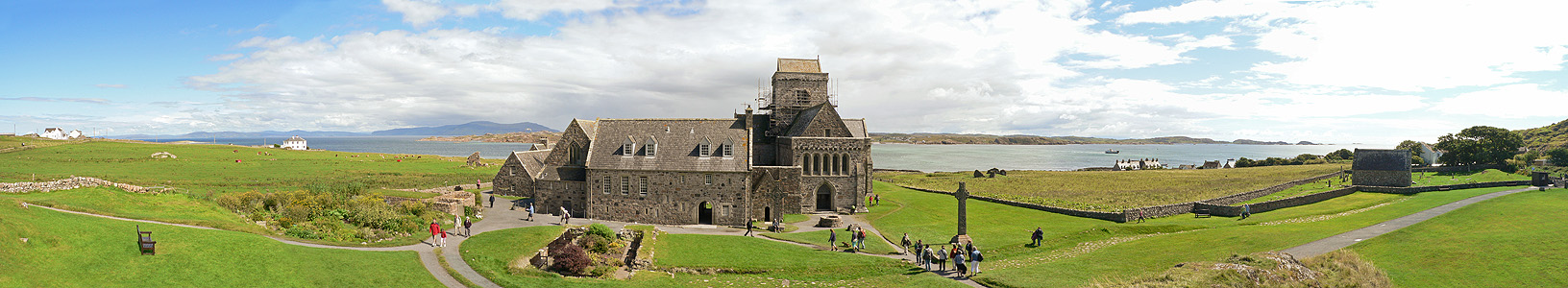
Panoramic view

Abbots of Iona in the Benedictine era
| Incumbent | Period | Citation(s) | Notes |
|---|---|---|---|
| Cellach | fl. 1203–04 | | |
| Amhalgaid Ó Fearghail | fl. 1204 | | c. 1204 the house of Derry installs Amhalgaid in opposition to Cellach |
| Fionnlagh | fl. c. 1320 | | |
| Peadar | Died or resigned 1357 | | |
| Finghuine mac Ghille-Brìghde MacFhionghain | c. 1357–1405 | | |
| Eóin mac Gofraidh MacAlasdair | 1405–c.1421 | | |
| Dominic mac Ghille-Coinnich | 1421–1444 x 1465 | | |
| Aonghas mac Aonghais | postulated 1465 | | Aonghas was son of Aonghas Óg. |
| Eóin MacFhionghain | 1467–1498 | | Eóin was son of Lachlan MacFhionghain. |

== List of abbot-commendators ==
Abbot-commendators of Iona
| Incumbent | Period | Citation(s) | Notes |
|---|---|---|---|
| Eóin Caimbeul I | 1499–1510 | | |
| George Hepburn | 1510–1513 | | Died at the battle of Flodden, 9 September 1513 |
| Eóin Caimbeul II | 1514–1532 | | |
| Ailean MacGill-Eathain | provided 1526 | | |
| Seumas Sdíbhard | crown nomination 1529 | | A kinsman of the earl of Lennox, he was abbot of Dryburgh. |
| Fearchar Mac Eachainn | 1528–1544 x 1546 | | |
| Ruairidh MacGill-Eathain | 1544–1552 x 1553 | | |
| Ruairidh MacAlasdair | 1545–1546 | | |
| Ailean Mac an Toisic | 1546 | | |
| John Hay | postulate 1547 | | |
| Pádraig MacGill-Eathain | 1547–1552 | | |
| Alexander Gordon | 1553–1562 | | |
| Eóin Caimbeul III | 1557–1560 x 1562 | | |
| Pádraig MacGill-Eathain (again) | 1560–1565 | | |
| Séon Carsuel | 1565–1572 | | |
| Lachlan MacGill-Eathain | c. 1567 | | Despite Scottish Reformation, he was suspected of having received license from Mary, Queen of Scots, to go to the Pope to receive the abbey and the Bishopric of the Isles, but denied the allegation and renounced his claims to Carsuel. |
| Eóin Caimbeul III (again) | 1572–1581 | | |
| Alasdair Caimbeul | 1581–1615 | | The abbey was annexed to the bishopric of the Isles on 11 August 1615; Alasdair Caimbeul was still alive on 30 September 1619. |
