= Arculf =

Late 7th c. Frankish bishop, traveler in the Levant

Arculf (Latin: Arculfus) was a Frankish churchman who toured the Holy Land around 670 AD. Venerable Bede claimed he was a bishop from Gaul (Galliarum episcopus). According to Bede's Ecclesiastical History of the English People (V, 15), Arculf was shipwrecked on the shore of Iona on his return from his pilgrimage. He was hospitably received by Adomnán, the abbot of the island monastery from 679 to 704, to whom he gave a detailed narrative of his travels. Adomnán, with aid from some further sources, was able to produce De Locis Sanctis ("on the sacred places"), a descriptive work in three books dealing with Jerusalem, Bethlehem, other sites in the Holy Land, and briefly with Alexandria and Constantinople. Many details about Arculf's journeys can be inferred from this text.

His description of Jerusalem contains the oldest known reference to Al-Aqsa Mosque:

In that famous place where once stood the magnificently constructed Temple, near the eastern wall, the Saracens now frequent a rectangular house of prayer which they have built in a crude manner, constructing it from raised planks and large beams

— Ecclesiastical History of the English People

As well as an incident of Caliph Mu'awiya I resolving a dispute between the Christians and Jews of the city.
