= Martyrs of Iona =

Group of 68 monks martyred in Scotland

- Born: unknown
- Died: 806; Iona Abbey
- Venerated in: Roman Catholic Church Eastern Orthodox Church

The martyrs of Iona were a group of 68 Celtic Christian monks who lived at Iona Abbey (on the island of Iona, Scotland) and were massacred there in the early ninth century.

Viking raids of the British and Irish coasts began in 793 AD, when the Vikings conducted a bloody attack on the monastery of Lindisfarne on the English coast; so began the Viking Age of conquest. Iona itself suffered numerous attacks, starting in 795 AD and continuing in 802, 806, and 825. The massacre of the martyrs of Iona was the result of the raid of 806 AD, where fleets of Vikings stormed the abbey, pillaged it for riches, and killed the monks, who were largely without weapons, and thus defenseless. This was Iona's first incidence of "red martyrdom", or the bestowing of martyrdom as a result of violent death by religious persecution.

Medieval monasteries and abbeys were frequently the target of Viking raids because they were wealthy landowners, and stored vast amounts of gold and other precious materials. Vikings plundered abbeys, like Iona Abbey, for riches, food, and even their holy texts—which were, at the time, often inscribed with gold leaf. The Isle of Iona was particularly vulnerable because it was easily accessible to Viking boats and hard to reinforce from the mainland.

The monks of Iona Abbey were known best for their work on the Book of Kells, an illuminated Latin manuscript of the Gospel. It is largely accepted that after the massacre in 806, survivors fled to the Abbey of Kells in Ireland, where work on the book continued.

Sixty-eight monks were massacred in the course of the raid of 806, and the sandy beach where the Vikings beached their ships was called Martyrs' Bay in commemoration of the event.

== Other Notable Martyrs of Iona ==
A few years after the raid of 806, St. Blathmac was killed during another Viking attack (825 AD) at Iona Abbey. He was struck down whilst celebrating Mass.

== See also ==
- List of Catholic saints
