= De locis sanctis =

7th-century architectural/travel books

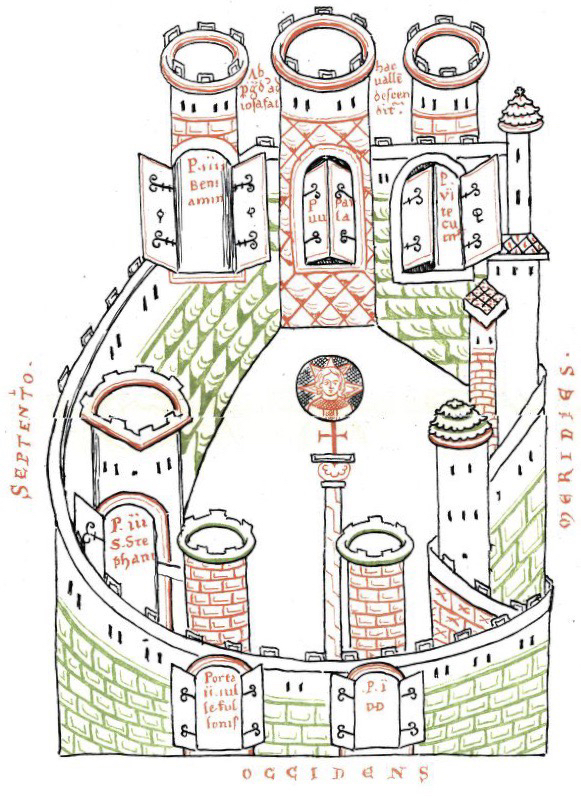
De locis sanctis' ('Concerning sacred places') map of Jerusalem

De locis sanctis (Concerning sacred places) was composed by the Irish monk Adomnán, a copy being presented to King Aldfrith of Northumbria in 698. It was based on an account by the Frankish monk Arculf of his travels to the Holy Land, from which Adomnán, with aid from some further sources, was able to produce a descriptive work in three books, dealing with Jerusalem, Bethlehem, and other places in The Holy Land, and briefly with Alexandria and Constantinople. It aimed to give a faithful account of what Arculf actually saw during his journey. Many of the manuscripts contain the second earliest known map of Jerusalem (it was the earliest known map until the discovery of the Madaba Map.)

The work contains the four earliest known drawings of Christian churches in the Holy Land; three are in Jerusalem (the Church of the Holy Sepulchre, the Church of Zion, and the Chapel of the Ascension) and one in Nablus (the Church of Jacob's Well).

== First book ==
The first book of Adomnán's transcription concerns what Arculf saw during nine months he spent in Jerusalem ca 680 AD, beginning with useful descriptions of "the Sepulchre of the Lord and the Church constructed over it, the form of which Arculf himself depicted for me on a tablet covered with wax" and mentioning the Basilica of Constantine and other features such as the column that marked the center of the Earth. Arculf also saw many relics such as the miraculous grave cloth of Jesus (compare the Shroud of Turin), which had brought generations of good fortune, and the very fig tree on which Judas Iscariot hanged himself. Arculf saw the Basilica of Mount Zion, Mount Olivet and the Tomb of Lazarus at Bethany. Everywhere Arculf's description attests to the flocks of pilgrims in the Christian holy places.

== Second book ==
The second book begins with Arculf's trip to Bethlehem and the church dedicated to Saint Mary over the half-cave of the Nativity, the simple churches, one containing the tomb of King David another of Saint Jerome and even those of the shepherds who were present at the Nativity. Arculf visited the tomb of Rachel, six miles west of Jerusalem. Brief mention is then made of the ruins of Hebron and of Jericho and the Sepulchre of Arba's tombs of the four patriarchs (Abraham, Isaac, Jacob, and Adam), and the oak of Abraham. Arculf next refers to Galgal and the church containing Twelve Stones of the tribes of Israel. The journey then picks up along the Jordan River where Arculf saw the place where John baptized Christ as well as the small church located at the spot where Jesus left his clothes while the baptism took place. Nearby was a monastery and a church built in honor of John the Baptist. Arculf saw the Dead Sea and the sources of the Jordan, two adjacent springs, named "Jor" and "Dan", the Sea of Galilee and the well of Samaria, where the Lord met the Samaritan woman. At Nazareth he visited the Church of the Annunciation. Mount Tabor in Galilee is next in the narrative. Arculf's guide, a certain Peter, a Burgundian hermit, would allow him to tarry no longer than necessary "…for a rapid inspection". Arculf continues with brief allusions to the cities of Damascus and Tyre, then he left Jerusalem and traveled forty days to reach Alexandria, where was the church containing the tomb of the Evangelist Mark.

== Third book ==
The brief third book makes quick mention of Arculf's passage via Crete to Constantinople, where he stayed from Christmas to Easter. Arculf mentions the relics of the True Cross and legends of George the Confessor, adds a note about the island of Mount Vulcanus east of Sicily and ends rather abruptly, with a brief Epilogue.

Arculf and Adomnán's De locis sanctis was recopied and widely read all over western Europe. Bede mentioned Arculf's itinerary in his History and based upon it his own treatise on the holy places. It was first printed in Ingolstadt, 1619.

== Editions ==
=== Manuscript ===
A list of known manuscripts is show below:

- Vienna, O.N.B. Lat. 458 (codex Y in Geyer); 10th century
- Vienna, O.N.B. Lat. 609; 10th century
- Paris, B.N. Lat. 13048 (codex P in Geyer); 9th century
- London, B.L. Cotton Tiberius D.v. pt 2; 14th century
- Zurich ZBZ Rh 73 (codex Z in Geyer's); 9th century
- Berne, Stadtbibliothek 582; 10th century
- St Gallen, Stiftsbibliothek 320; 12th century
- Konigswart, 20 H 39; 12th century
- Karlsruhe, Augiensis CXXIX; 9-10th century
- Brussels, Bib. roy. 2911-22 (codex B in Geyer);9th century
- Munich, clm 19150; 10th century
- Vatican, Reg. Lat. 618; 15th century
- Berlin, Staatsbibliothek Lat. oct. 32; 15th century
- Vatican, Vat. Lat. 636A; 13th century
- Paris, B.N. Lat. 12943; 11th century
- Laon, B.M.92; 9th century
- Perigueux,"7 B.M. Cadouin 37; 12th century
- Exemplar of Gretser's edition
- Berlin, lat. 861
- Salzburg aXII 25, fragment 6
- Munich, clm 13002

=== Latin ===
- Paul Geyer, 1898, Itinera hierosolymitana saecvli IIII-VIII, pages 219-297 (critical edition, in Latin, which formed the basis for subsequent research)

=== English ===
- De locis sanctis (English; J. R. Macpherson translation, 1898)
- Meehan, D (ed.) Adomnan's 'De Locis Sanctis' (Dublin, 1958).

=== Other ===
- John Wilkinson (1977). Jerusalem Pilgrims Before the Crusades. Aris & Phillips. ISBN 978-0-85668-078-6.
- Woods, D. ‘Arculf's Luggage: The Sources for Adomnán's De Locis Sanctis’, Ériu 52 (2002), 25–52.
