= Dúnchad mac Cinn Fáelad =

Dúnchad mac Cinn Fáelad (also called Dunichad, Duncad, and Donatus; died 717) was the eleventh abbot of Iona (707–717). He was the son of Cenn Fáelad, and grandson of Máel Coba, of the Cenél Conaill. While most early abbots of Iona were members of Cenél Conaill they came from minor branches of the kindred, but Dúnchad came from the ruling line, grandson of one High King of Ireland and the nephew of two others, Cellach and Conall.

He is first heard of as Abbot of Killochuir on the coast of southeastern Ulster (perhaps Killough, County Down). He later became Abbot of Iona, although there is considerable dispute about this matter. The Annals of Ulster first mention him in that capacity in the year 707; but Conamail of Iona is said to have been the abbot of Iona from 704 through 710. It is possible that Dúnchad served as a coadjutor (or principatum tenuit) of Conamail of Iona. He himself may have been elected in opposition to Abbot Conamail, while Dorbbéne in 713 and Fáelchú in 716 may have been elected to oppose Dúnchad. It has also been suggested that at least some of these people may have coadjutors, priors, or possibly even bishops at Iona at the time. The final agreement about the dating of Easter on Iona took place at the instance of St. Ecgberht of Northumbria, a priest who had been educated in Ireland, who successfully persuaded the community to abandon the Celtic Easter and tonsure.

When Dúnchad died in 717, Fáelchú continued in his position. In the same year of Dúnchad's death, King Nechtan mac Derile, the Gaelic ruler of the Picts, allegedly expelled the Ionan clergy from Pictland. His feast day is 25 May.

== Dorbbéne ==
The Annals of the Four Masters (713.5), records the death of St. Dorbaine Foda, Abbot of Ia. Dorbbéne became abbot in 713, but died five months later on 25 October 713. Leslie Toke suggests that Dorbbéne may have been a coadjutors to St. Dunchadh, prior, or even a bishop. Thomas Owen Clancy suggests that this interruption in Dúnchad's abbacy may reflect the politics between factions of monks at Iona at the time who disagreed about the dating of Easter.

Catholic Church titles
| Preceded by Conamail | Abbot of Iona; 707–717 | Succeeded by Fáelchú |
