= Conamail mac Faílbi =

Conamail mac Faílbi was the tenth abbot of Iona (704–707). Although he did not die until 710, his successor Dunchad was made abbot in 707. This may be evidence of a split in the Iona community over the Easter controversy, a mistake in the sources, or an otherwise unexplained resignation. Conamail features on the guarantor-list of the Cáin Adomnáin.

== Bibliography ==
- Sharpe, Richard, Adomnán of Iona: Life of St. Columba, (London, 1995)

Preceded by Adomnán	Abbot of Iona; 704–707	Succeeded by Dunchad
