= Chronicle of Ireland =

Hypothetical Irish documents

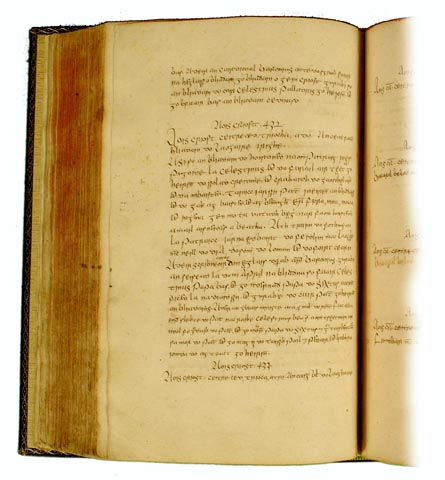
The entry for the year 432 in the Annals of the Four Masters, one of the works which is descended from the Chronicle of Ireland.

The Chronicle of Ireland (Irish: Croinic na hÉireann) is the modern name for a hypothesized collection of ecclesiastical annals recording events in Ireland from 432 to 911 AD.

Several surviving annals share the same sequences and wordings of recorded events, up until the year 911, where the narratives split apart. These include the Annals of Inisfallen, the Annals of Ulster, the Chronicon Scotorum, the Annals of Clonmacnoise, the Annals of Tigernach, the Annals of Roscrea, the Annals of Boyle, and the Fragmentary Annals of Ireland. "The Chronicle of Ireland" represents the scholarly consensus for the solution to this Gaelic synoptic problem.

== Format ==
Events are listed in separate entries under the heading of a single year. Most entries consist of only one or two sentences, and some years contain only one or two entries. The Viking raid on Iona Abbey in 806, in which the entire population of the abbey was massacred, is recorded with typical brevity:

The community of Iona was killed by the gentiles, that is sixty-eight (referring to the number of dead).

== Authorship ==
There is no direct evidence for the identity of the Chronicle's successive authors, but scholars are confident that it was produced by annalists working in churches and monasteries and was intended for an ecclesiastical audience. The hypothesized version of the Chronicle that annalists and chroniclers were working from was written in different places at different times; the earliest evidence for one of its authors places it in Iona sometime after 563, continuing until about 642. Around 639, another chronicle of uncertain origin was begun elsewhere and merged with the Iona chronicle in the second half of the 7th century. The resulting chronicle was then continued until about 740. From about 740 to 911, the Chronicle's annalist was working in the Irish midlands, probably in the province of Brega (sometimes Breagh) but possibly in the monastery at Clonard. Some scholars believe that work may have moved to Armagh by the beginning of the 9th century, but debate continues on this point.

After 911, the Chronicle's descendants break into two main branches: one in Armagh, which was integrated into the Annals of Ulster; and a "Clonmacnoise group" including the Annals of Clonmacnoise (an English translation), the Annals of Tigernach (fragmentary), the Chronicum Scotorum (an abbreviation of Tigernach), and the Annals of the Four Masters. Most surviving witnesses to the lost Chronicle's original content are descended from the Annals of Clonmacnoise.

== Content ==
A large number of the Chronicle's entries are obituaries. The cause of death was significant to the annalists as an indicator of the death's "spiritual quality"; they felt it indicated whether the deceased would go to Heaven or Hell.

After 800, records of Viking raids (as in the example above) also make up a large number of entries. Other entries include observations of astronomical events, such as a solar eclipse that took place on June 29, 512. Some events that occurred outside Ireland also appear in the Chronicle; during some parts of the eighth and ninth centuries, its chronology for certain events in England is more accurate than that of the Anglo-Saxon Chronicle.

== Chronological apparatus ==
As of the middle 7th century, the Chronicle's dating scheme "consisted of a kalend (Kl) followed, until at least the mid-seventh century, by the ferial of 1 January". This scheme, and much of the Chronicle's witness to world history prior to 400, was based on the chronicle of Rufinus of Aquileia who wrote in the early 5th century.

== See also ==
- Irish annals

== Sources ==
- Flechner, Roy (2013). "The Chronicle of Ireland: Then and Now". Early Medieval Europe. 21 (4): 422–54. doi:10.1111/emed.12025.
- Charles-Edwards, T.M. (2006). The Chronicle of Ireland. Liverpool University Press. ISBN 978-0-85323-959-8.
- McCarthy, D. (2005) Irish chronicles and their chronology
- Evans, N. (2010) 'The Present and the Past in Medieval Irish Chronicles', Woodbridge & Rochester, Boydell & Brewer
