= Diarmait of Iona =

Diarmait of Iona was Abbot of Iona (814–832?). Thomas Owen Clancy argues that Diarmait was one of the most important Céli Dé reformers, instrumental to the spread of the movement in Scotland, laying the ground for his successor Indrechtach. Many anecdotes about the rule and philosophy of the abbot were recorded in the Monastery of Tallaght, for which Diarmait was probably one of the main sources and inspirations.

Diarmait took over control of Iona in 814 when his predecessor Cellach resigned, in the same year that Kells had been founded. The same entry in the Annals of Ulster that reported Cellach's resignation, tells us that Diarmait was the alumnus, the pupil or fosterson of a man called Daigre. Whatever his origin, Diarmait's abbacy was a troublesome one. In 817, Áed mac Néill the king of the Cenél nEóghain killed the prior of Raphoe monastery, which compelled the Ionan monks to send a delegation to Tara to proclaim the latter king's exile. The next year it is reported by the Chronicon Scotorum that Diarmait went to Scotland with the relics of Colum Cille. It might be noted that the Annals of Innisfallen recorded that in the very next year, 819, Áed died on an expedition to Scotland. In 825, Iona was attacked by a group of Vikings, but Diarmait lived on, as it is reported in 829 that he went again to Scotland with the relics of Colum Cille. He is mentioned for the last time in 831, when the Annals of Ulster reported that "Diarmait came to Ireland with the halidoms (i.e. relics) of Colum Cille". His death date is actually unknown, and no successor of his is mentioned until the Annals of Ulster reports his successor Indrechtach's visit to Ireland with Columba's relics in 849.

== See also ==
- Clancy, Thomas Owen, "Iona, Scotland and the Céli Dé", in Barbara Crawford (ed.), Scotland in Dark Age Britain, (Aberdeen, 1996), pp. 111–30

== Notes ==
Preceded by Cellach	Abbot of Iona; 814-832?	Succeeded by Indrechtach
