= Fáilbe mac Pípáin =

Fáilbe mac Pípáin was the eighth abbot of Iona (fl. 669–679). Fáilbe was of the same kindred as Columba, the Cenél Conaill, distantly related to him through their common ancestor Conall Gulban. We know from the writings of Adomnán that Fáilbe was at Iona when King Oswald of Northumbria visited sometime in the 630s and was also present when Saint Ernéne, son of Crasen, visited before his death in 635. Little is known of his abbacy, but we do know he enjoyed a good relationship with his monk and successor, Adomnán, to whom he relayed information. Fáilbe died on 22 March 679.

== Bibliography ==
- Sharpe, Richard, Adomnán of Iona: Life of St. Columba, (London, 1995)

Preceded by Cumméne	Abbot of Iona; 669–679	Succeeded by Adomnán
