= Indract of Glastonbury =

Irish Saint

Indract

Confessor and martyr
- Born: unknown Ireland
- Died: unknown, but traditionally either Huish Episcopi or Shapwick
- Major shrine: Glastonbury Abbey
- Feast: 5 February
- Catholic cult suppressed: Dissolution of the monasteries, 1539

Indract or Indracht was an Irish saint who, along with his companions, was venerated at Glastonbury Abbey, a monastery in the county of Somerset in south-western England. In the High Middle Ages Glastonbury tradition held that he had been an Irish pilgrim – a king's son – on his way back from Rome who was molested and killed by a local thegn after he had stopped off to visit the shrine of Saint Patrick. This tradition synchronised his life with that of King Ine (688–726), though historian Michael Lapidge has argued that he is most likely to represent a 9th-century abbot of Iona named Indrechtach ua Fínnachta.

The cult seems to date from the late 10th or early 11th century, though this is uncertain. There is one main extant account, the anonymous 12th century Passio sancti Indracti. An earlier text written in Old English is said to have existed and been used by the writer of the Passio. There is also evidence that the 12th-century historian William of Malmesbury wrote his own saint's life, and although now lost it may also have used the Old English text. In the 14th century a St Alban's monk added significant new material of probable Cornish origin, mentioning a sister named Dominica (for whom St Dominic, Cornwall is named) and some miracles.

== Early evidence ==
The body of Indract supposedly lay in a stone shrine, with Saint Patrick's, in the Old Church of St Mary at Glastonbury Abbey. The historical identity of the Indract resting in this shrine is obscure, but it is unlikely that he can be identified with any known figure of the 7th or 8th centuries, the period of his life according to later Glastonbury sources.

There is however a strong similarity between the story of the Glastonbury Indract and that of a 9th-century abbot of Iona, Indrechtach ua Fínnachta, whom several contemporary Irish sources report as being "martyred among the English (apud Saxones)" in 854. These sources give his death date as 12 March, which differs from the Canterbury date of 8 May. A plausible explanation is that later monks at Glastonbury, possessing the body and only a bare story, invented the rest. The cult, although never widespread outside Glastonbury, became known in Ireland: the Martyrology of Tallaght in the 12th century Book of Leinster has a marginal note about the Glastonbury Indract and also lists his feast day as 8 May.

There is no evidence however that Indract's cult existed at Glastonbury before the 11th century. A calendar produced at Glastonbury around 970 (from the Leofric Missal) omits his name, yet in a Leominster litany (BL Cotton Galba A xiv) dated by historian Michael Lapidge to the second quarter of the 11th century his name is listed as "confessor", and is placed next to St Patrick's, hinting at a Glastonbury base for the cult. This litany is the earliest evidence of the cult for Indract, in England at least. He is named as a "martyr" in a late 11th-century litany from Winchester.

== Passio sancti Indracti ==
His story in its earliest form is told in the 12th century Passio sancti Indracti or "Passion of St Indract" (Oxford Bodleian Library MS Digby 112). The Passio's anonymous author claims that he used an earlier life in Old English as his source. This earlier work has not survived.

According to the Passio, Indract was a deacon and the son of an Irish king. He and his nine companions had gone to Rome on pilgrimage and on their return journey they decided to visit Glastonbury and the shrine of St Patrick there, staying for a night at a place called Huish Episcopi (Hywisc). As it happened, the ruler of the region, King Ine, was staying nearby at South Petherton (Pedred). A king's thegn named Husa, with some followers, attacked and killed the Irish pilgrims, believing they possessed gold. After a posthumous miracle, King Ine had the bodies of most of the martyrs buried in the church of St Mary. The body of one companion is said not to have been found, but on their feast day, 8 May, a column of light is said to emanate from his place of burial. The text proceeds to recount some more posthumous miracles, including a vision by Guthlac of Glastonbury, a future abbot of Glastonbury.

== William of Malmesbury ==
The 16th century antiquarian John Leland wrote that among the various saint lives at Glastonbury was a Vita Indracti by William of Malmesbury. William of Malmesbury, in his De Antiquitate Glastoniensis Ecclesiae, claimed to have discussed the saint in another work. William's Vita Indracti, though once believed to have been the Passio, has not survived.

Indract is however mentioned by William of Malmesbury in three surviving works. Notable "discrepancies" [Lapidge] between the Passio and William's assertions in these works include his failure to associate Indract with Abbot Guthlac (despite making mention of this abbot in other contexts), failure to name the location of the martyring, and giving the number of Indract's companions as seven. Historian Michael Lapidge believed that the source for William of Malmesbury's work was Old English text, and that differences between the Passio and William of Malmesbury can be accounted for by embellishments added by the Passio author.

== Later evidence ==
John Seen of Glastonbury, writing around 1342, is the next important source of information about Indract and his cult. He repeats more or less the same story as the Passio, but his account differs in various details. The martyrdom takes place at Shapwick (Schapwik), not Huish Episcopi (Hywisc), and he follows William of Malmesbury in giving the number of companions as seven. Michael Lapidge suggested, on the basis of similarities with William of Malmesbury, that John Seen had probably consulted William's lost work.

The St Alban's monk John of Tynemouth, another mid 14th century author, adds information regarding Indract in his Sanctilogium Angliae. Although otherwise summarising the Passio account, he relates a new tradition about Indract and a sister of his named Dominica. Indract with his (nine) companions and his sister Dominica, on their way to Rome, stopped at a place called Tamerunta. There Indract drove his staff into the ground, causing an oak tree to grow, and there he caused a pond to provide a plentiful supply of fish. The place Tamerunta (see "Tamerton Foliot") lies along the river Tamar on the Cornish border, and suggests that this new information came from a Cornish source, perhaps the church of St Germans.

The chronicler William Worcester, writing in 1478, claimed that Indract and his companions lay at Shepton Mallet, five miles from Glastonbury. This may be a misunderstanding, perhaps based on a commemoration stone at Shapwick, which William has confused with Shepton. Indract's relics are listed in two 14th-century Glastonbury lists of relics (BL Cotton Titus D vii fols. 2r–13v and Cambridge Trinity College MS R.5.33 (724) fols. 104r–105v).

As an indication of the local nature of his cult, his name occurs in only one English calendar of saints, a 15th-century manuscript probably written at Glastonbury (Up Holland College, MS 98). A chapel at St Dominick in Cornwall was dedicated to him, though the suggestion that Landrake was named after him has been deemed "impossible" [Lapidge]. This chapel was licensed in 1405 and 1418 and may have been at a place called Chapel where there is a holy well. There is a small modern chapel dedicated to St Indract at Halton Quay near St Dominic.
