= Blathmac =

8th century Irish monk and saint

Saint Blathmac
- Born: c. 750 AD; Ireland
- Died: c. 825; Iona
- Venerated in: Eastern Orthodox Church; Roman Catholic Church

Saint Blathmac (Latin: Blathmacus, Florentius) was a distinguished Irish monk, born in Ireland about 750 AD. He is known as "Blathmac, son of Flann", to distinguish him from the poet and monk Blathmac mac Con Brettan.

He was killed and became a martyr in Iona, about 825. His biography was written by Strabo, the Benedictine Abbot of Reichenau (824–849), and thus the story of his martyrdom has been handed down.

== Early life ==
Blathmac, the scion of a noble family, early showed a religious turn of mind. Strabo describes him as a warrior prince, and "a future king of his people" who gave up his patrimony to enter religious life. His name was Latinized Florentius (from the Irish word bláth meaning "flower").

== Career ==
He became the abbot of an Irish monastery, and in 824 left to join the community of monks at Iona which traced itself to Columba.

He was serving as prior or acting abbot in the absence of Diarmait of Iona, who had taken most of the community to Kells for safety. Anticipating yet another viking raid, Blathmac had what remained of the relics of Columba hidden. Not long afterwards the Danes ravaged the island. One morning, as he was offering mass, the Scandinavian rovers entered the monastic church. Blathmac refused to point out the relics or the Brecbannoch of St Columba, which were the object of plunder. In retaliation he was hacked to pieces on the altar steps.

His body was afterwards reverently interred at the scene. Miracles are claimed to have been wrought through his intercession. The date of his death is given by the "Annals of Ulster" as 825, although Mabillon places it thirty-six years earlier.
