= Iona Abbey =

Abbey in Argyll and Bute, Scotland

Coordinates: 56°20′03″N 06°23′37″W

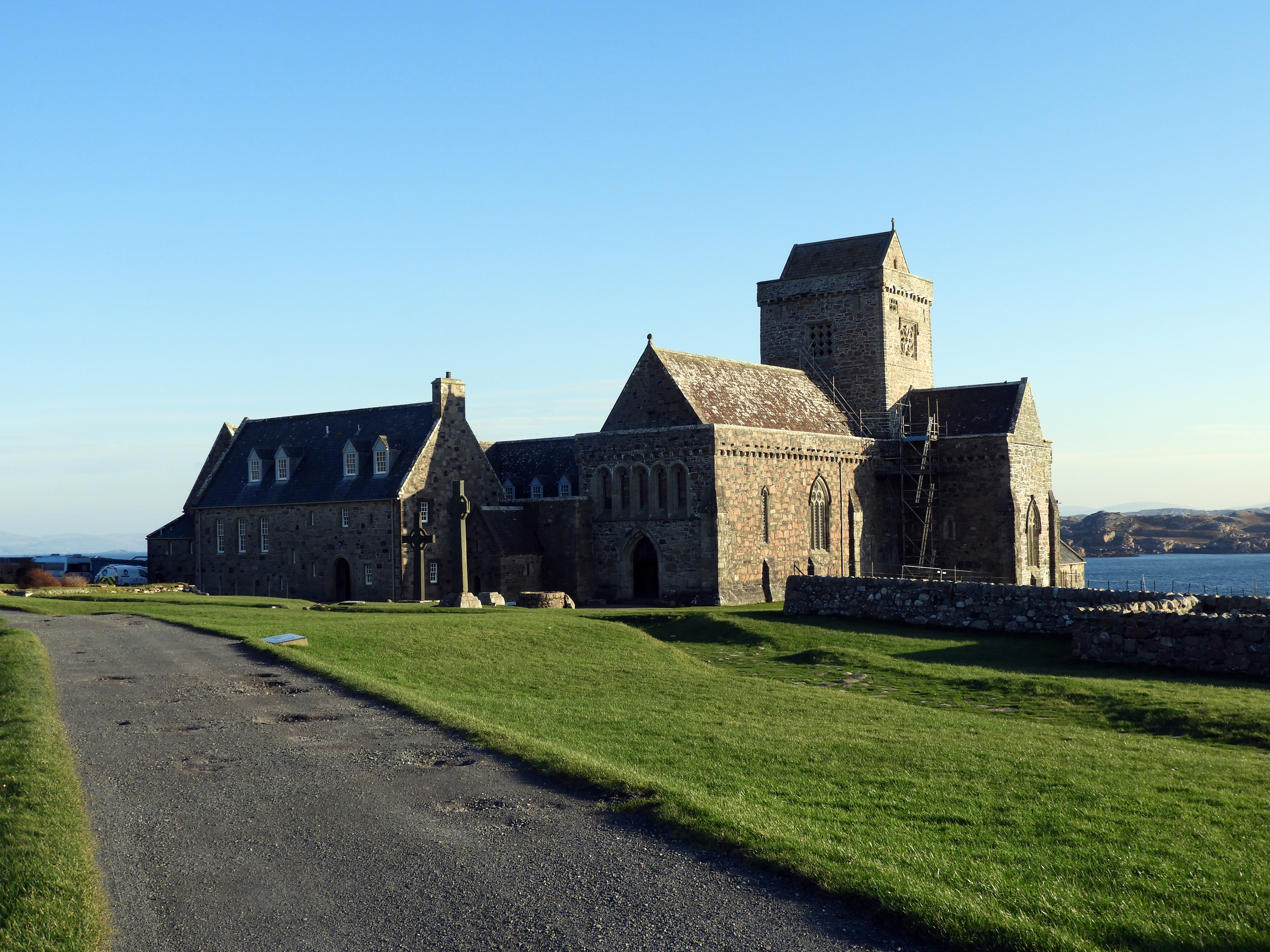

- Location within Mull
- Established: 563; 1463 years ago
- Location: Isle of Iona PA76 6SQ, United Kingdom
- Website: www.historicenvironment.scot/visit-a-place/places/iona-abbey-and-nunnery/

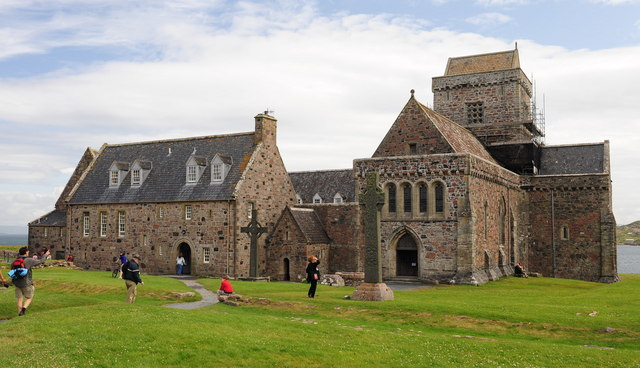
Iona Abbey

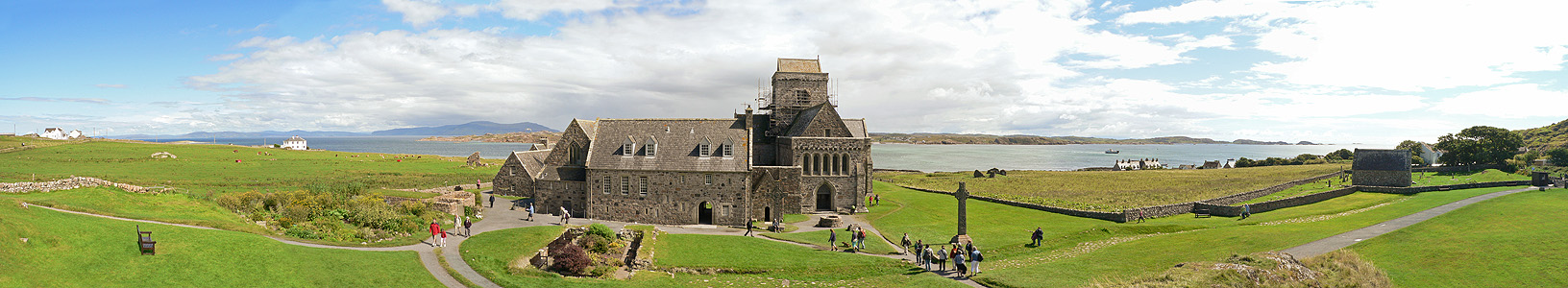
Panoramic view

Iona Abbey is an abbey located on the island of Iona, off the larger Isle of Mull on the west coast of Scotland.

It is one of the oldest Christian religious centres in Western Europe, and was a focal point for the spread of Christianity throughout Scotland. It was founded, along with its monastic community, by Saint Columba and his twelve companions in 563, when Iona was part of the Kingdom of Dál Riata. Saint Aidan served as a monk there in the 7th century before helping to re-establish Christianity in Northumberland, on the island of Lindisfarne.

In the 12th century, the Macdonald lords of Clan Donald made Iona the ecclesiastical capital of the royal family of Macdonald, and subsequent Lords of the Isles into the early 16th century endowed and maintained the abbey, church and nunnery. Two of the Macdonalds (each named Angus) became Bishops of the Isles with the bishop's seat at Iona. St Oran's Chapel was the burial place for the Lords as evidenced by their grave slabs.

From 1207 to 1493, the early Clan Donald and its Lords of the Isles were entirely central to Iona Abbey's medieval existence, development and prestige. This enduring Macdonald phase equals the 300 year period of primary Columban monasticism. It is paramount in providing the sole witness to Iona's extant architecture and is a principal witness to the surviving monuments. The Iona Abbey church was in all but name The Macdonald's Cathedral of The Isles. The medieval Iona Abbey, as seen today (restored in the 20th century), is largely the legacy of the 15th-century Clan Donald Lords of the Isles and their Clan Donald Abbots and Bishops.

Today, Iona Abbey is the spiritual home of the Iona Community, an ecumenical Christian religious order, whose headquarters are in Glasgow. The Abbey remains a popular site of Christian pilgrimage today.

== History ==
=== Early history ===
In 563, Columba came to Iona from Ireland with twelve companions and founded a monastery. It developed as an influential centre for the spread of Christianity among the Picts and Scots.

At this time, the name of the island and so the abbey was "Hy" or "Hii"; "Iona" only seems to date from the 14th century, as a mis-transcription of a Latinised "Ioua" for "Hy".

==== Lifestyle and practice ====
The prime purpose of the monastery was to create "a perfect monastery as an image of the heavenly city of Jerusalem" – Columba wanted to "represent the pinnacle of Christian virtues, as an example for others to emulate" – rather than to carry out explicitly missionary activity. The monks worshipped and worked daily, following Celtic Christianity practices and disciplines. They also managed assets and were involved with the local and wider community.

==== Construction and buildings ====
Like other Celtic Christian monasteries, Columba's monastery would have been made up of a number of wattle and timber, or wood and thatch buildings. These would have included a central church or oratory, the common refectory or kitchen, the library or scriptorium, monk cells or dormitories, and a guest house for visitors including pilgrims. It is believed that around 800AD the original wooden chapel was replaced by a stone chapel.

Columba's monastery was surrounded by a ditch and earth bank, part of which is believed to have pre-existed Columba's arrival, and part of which can still be seen to the north-west of the current abbey buildings.

===== Columba's day room =====
Adomnán describes a building on a small mound, Torr an Aba, in the monastery grounds where Columba worked and wrote. Charred wood has been dated from what is believed to be this site, and a socket to hold a cross (which is believed to have been erected later) is visible there. Archaeologist Elizabeth Fowler excavated there in 1956–7.

==== Manuscript and book production ====
The production of Christian manuscripts, books and annals was an important activity in the Iona monastery. The Chronicle of Ireland incorporated annals compiled on Iona up to about 740. The Book of Kells, an illuminated manuscript, is believed to have been produced by the monks of Iona in the years leading up to 800.

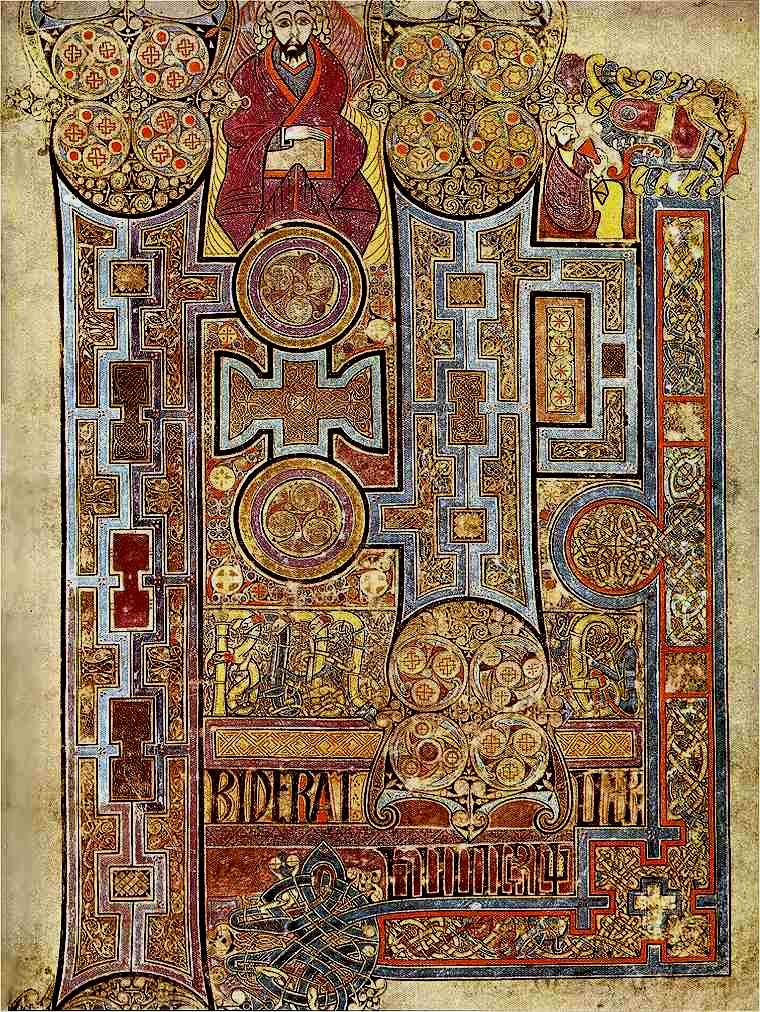
Book of Kells: This page (folio 292r) contains the lavishly decorated text that opens the Gospel of John.

==== Stone crosses ====
Stone crosses, both standing and lying, were used to mark graves in the Iona monastery. Large stone crosses were also erected, perhaps to broadcast key Christian messages, particularly in 800–1000. Their design reflected precious metal crosses. Some were carved from stone imported 50 nautical miles (90 kilometres) by boat from Loch Sween.

==== Other technology ====
Remains of wood-turning and metal-working have been found at Iona, and of glass (windows and beads) that may date from the 7th century.

==== Trade ====
The Iona monastery's position in what was then a well-used seaway would have facilitated trade, as would Columba's personal aristocratic background. Pigments from the south of France were used in Iona.

==== Viking attacks, and subsequent movement between abbeys ====
The Iona Abbey was first attacked by Viking raiders in 795, with subsequent attacks taking place in 802, 806, and 825. During the 806 Viking attack, 68 monks were massacred in Martyrs' Bay, and this led to many of the Columban monks relocating to the new Columban Abbey of Kells in Ireland.

The building at Kells took from 807 until the consecration of the church in 814. In 814, Cellach, Abbot of Iona, retired to Kells but, contrary to what is sometimes claimed, it is clear from the Annals that Iona remained the main Columban house for several decades, despite the danger of Viking raids.

In 825, Blathmac and those monks who remained with him at Iona were martyred in a Viking raid, and the Abbey was burned. But only in 878 were the main relics, with Columba's reliquary shrine specified in the records, moved to Ireland, with Kells becoming the new main Columban house. Though not mentioned, this might well have been when the Book of Kells came to Kells. However, Iona Abbey was probably not deserted as its continued importance is shown by the death there in 980 of Amlaíb Cuarán, a retired King of Dublin.

Saint Columba established several monasteries in Britain and Ireland, although he was mainly based at Iona.

Other monks from Iona moved to the Continent and established monasteries in Belgium, France and Switzerland.

=== Benedictine abbey ===
In 1114, Iona was seized by the King of Norway, who held it for fifty years before Somerled recaptured it, and invited renewed Irish involvement in 1164: this led to the construction of the central part of the cathedral. Ranald, Somerled's son, now the Lord of the Isles, in 1203 invited the Benedictine order to establish a new monastery, and an Augustinian Nunnery, on the Columban Monastery's foundations. Building work began on the new abbey church, on the site of Columba's original church. The following year, in 1204, the site was raided by a force led by two Irish bishops. This was a response by Ireland's Columban clergy to the loss of its connections and influence at this significant site founded by St Columba.

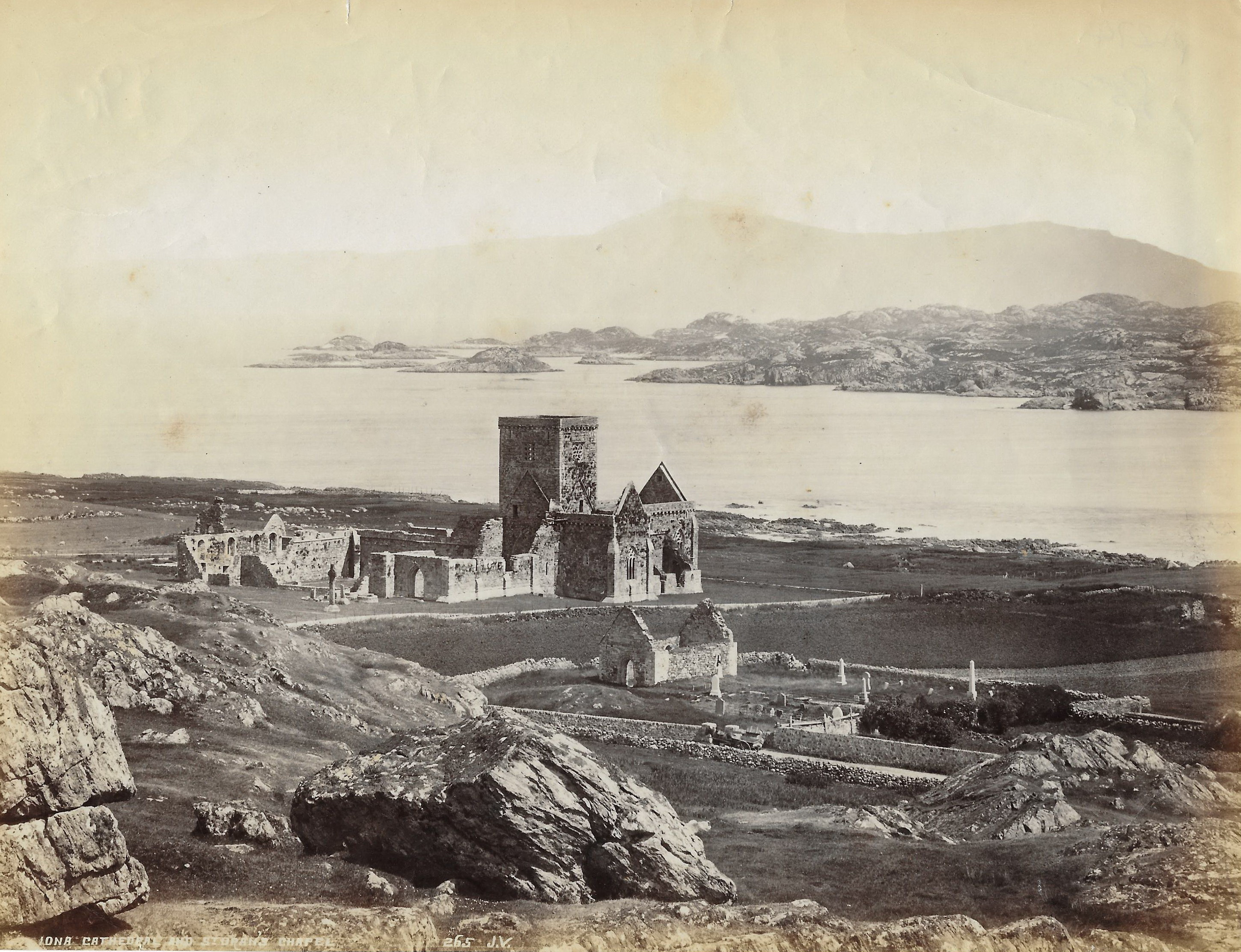
View of the Abbey remains in the late 19th century, showing the church and claustral buildings as roofless ruins

The Iona Nunnery (one of only three in Scotland – the other two were in Perth and Teampull na Trionaid in North Uist) was established south of the abbey buildings. The nunnery was founded by Somerled's daughter, Bethóc of the Augustinian Order. Graves of some of the early nuns remain, including that of a remarkable prioress, Anna Maclean, who died in 1543. Clearly visible under her outer robe is the rochet, a pleated surplice denoting the Augustinian Order. The nunnery buildings were rebuilt in the 15th century and fell into disrepair after the Reformation.

The abbey church was substantially expanded in the 15th century by the Macdonald Lords of the Isles who considered it their spiritual seat and the church, their Cathedral of the Isles. Following the Scottish Reformation, Iona, along with numerous other abbeys throughout the British Isles, was dismantled, and abandoned, its monks and libraries dispersed.

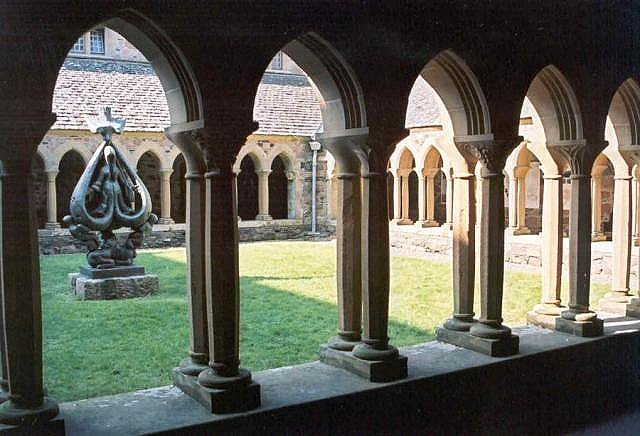
The cloisters of Iona Abbey

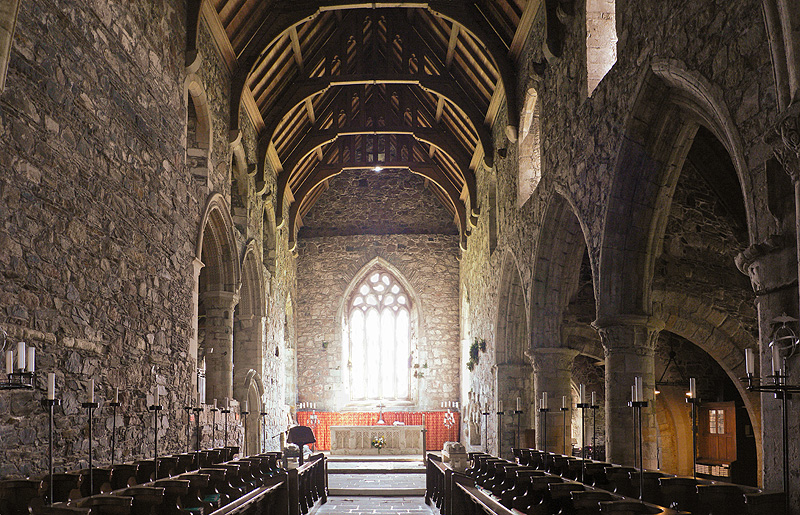
The medieval church

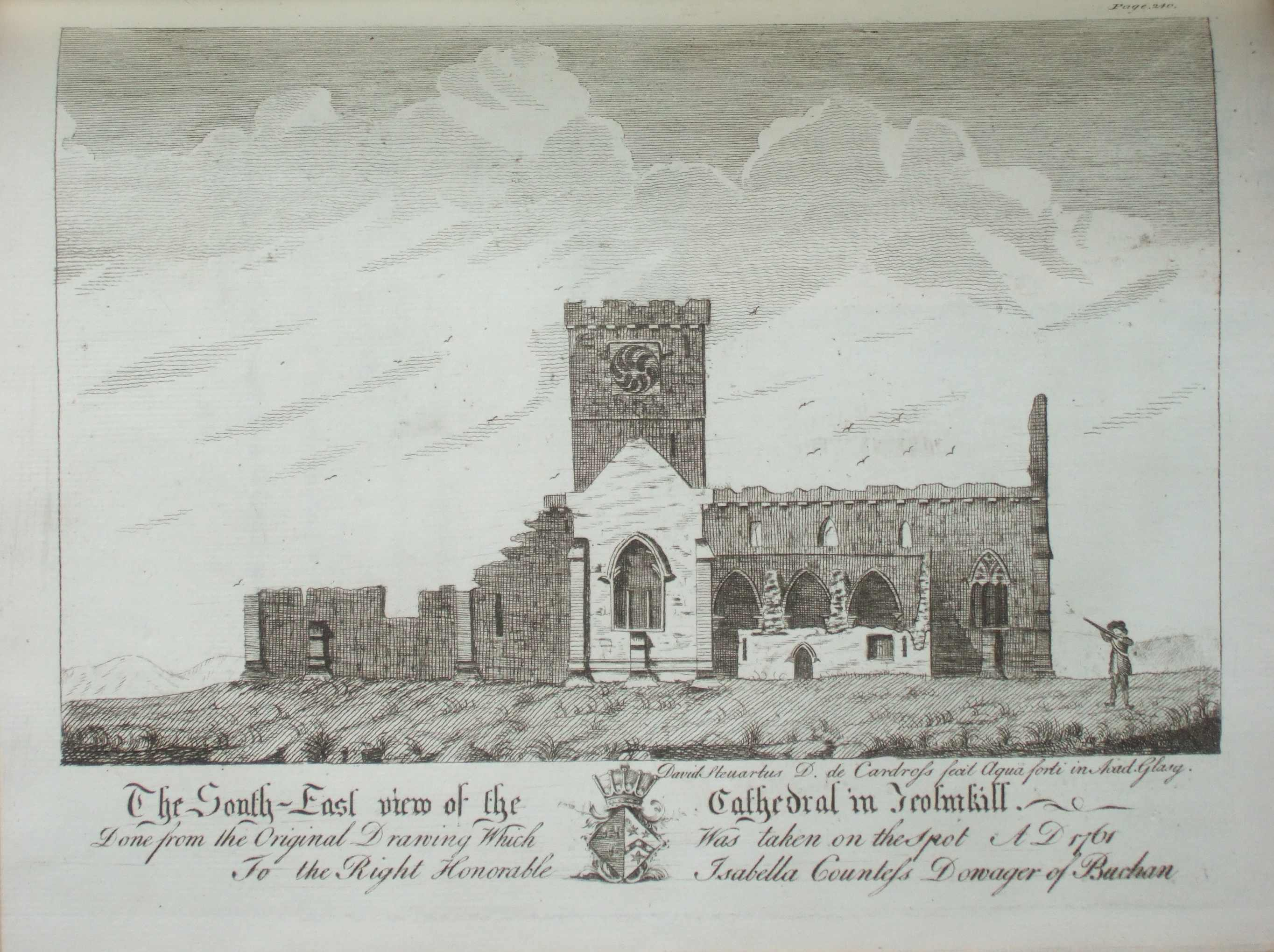
Engraving of the ruined abbey church in 1761

=== Modern abbey ===
In 1899, the Duke of Argyll transferred ownership of the ruined remains of the Abbey and Nunnery sites to the Iona Cathedral Trust, which undertook extensive restoration of the Abbey church. In 1938, the inspiration of Reverend George MacLeod led a group that rebuilt the abbey and founded the Iona Community. The reconstruction was organised by the architect Ian Gordon Lindsay having generously been passed the project by his senior mentor and friend Reginald Fairlie. The surrounding buildings were also reconstructed during the 20th century by the Iona Community. This ecumenical Christian community continues to use the site to this day.

The simple square font was added in 1908 and dedicated to the memory of the Very Rev Theodore Marshall, Moderator of the General Assembly of the Church of Scotland in that year.

In 2000, the Iona Cathedral Trust handed over the care of the abbey, nunnery and associated sites to Historic Scotland.

In June 2021, the abbey reopened following a £3.75 million renovation, fund-raised by the Iona Community over three years. The renovation included a renewable energy system and high-speed broadband.

== Items of interest ==
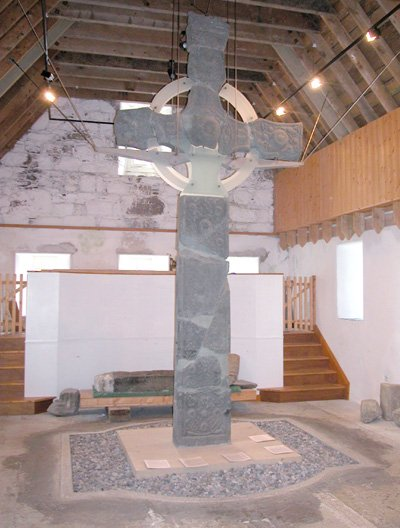
St John's Cross in the Abbey museum

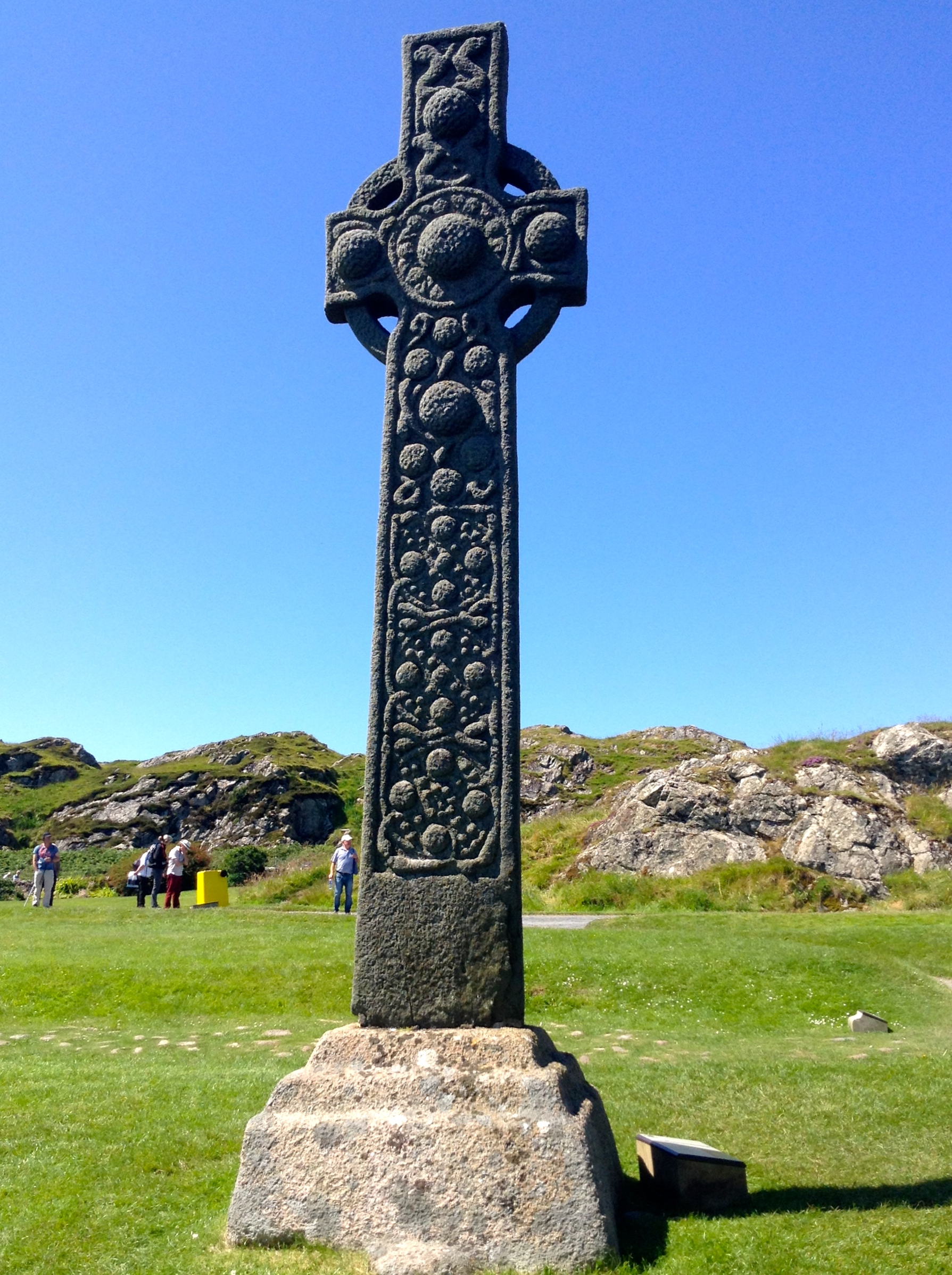
St Martin's Cross outside the abbey

Many early Scottish kings (said to be 48 in total), as well as kings from Ireland, Norway and France, are said to be buried in the Abbey graveyard. However, modern scholars are sceptical of such claims, which were likely mythic associated with increasing the prestige of Iona. Numerous leading Hebrideans, such as various Lords of the Isles and other prominent members of West Highland clans, were buried on Iona, including a row of Maclean chieftains and several early MacLeod chiefs. The site was much loved by John Smith, the 20th-century leader of the Labour Party, who was buried on Iona in 1994.

Several high crosses are found on the island of Iona. St Martin's Cross (dated to the 8th century) still stands by the roadside. A replica of St John's Cross is found by the doorway of the Abbey. The restored original is located in the Infirmary Museum at the rear of the abbey.

The contemporary Jedburgh-based sculptor Christopher Hall worked for many years on carvings on the cloisters of the abbey, which represent birds, flora and fauna native to the island. He also was commissioned to carve Smith's gravestone.

== See also ==
- Abbot of Iona, for a list of abbots
- Inchcolm Abbey, so-called "Iona of the east"
- Dunkeld Cathedral, chief centre of the Columban cult in later medieval Scotland
- Govan Old Parish Church, site of a Christian centre of the Clyde Britons since approximately AD 500
