= Ségéne mac Fiachnaí =

Fifth abbot of Iona

Ségéne mac Fiachnaí (or Ségéne of Iona) (died 12 August 652) was the fifth abbot of the Iona Abbey in Scotland (623–652).

Ségéne was of the Cenél Conaill, the same kindred as Columba, and he was the nephew of a previous abbot, Lasrén. It was during Ségéne's long abbacy that the famous controversy regarding the dating of Easter first made itself properly felt. Ségéne was the recipient of a letter on the dating Easter which has been dated to c. 632/3. Ségéne is known to have vigorously defended the Gaelic dating, and put his name to a letter written by the Gaelic clergy to Pope Severinus in 638.

Ségéne also established the first Gaelic missionaries amongst the English, sending Corman and then Áedan, the latter of whom, with the help of King Oswald of Northumbria (who himself had spent time in exile at Iona), established a daughter house and bishopric at Lindisfarne. It is not known if Ségéne ever met Columba, but he was a vital collector/transmitter of stories about the saint.

He died on 12 August 652.

== Bibliography ==
- Ó Cróinín, Dáibhí and Maura Walsh, Cummian's Letter De Controversia Paschali (Toronto, 1988).
- Sharpe, Richard, Adomnán of Iona: Life of St. Columba, (London, 1995).

Preceded by Fergnae	Abbot of Iona; 623–652	Succeeded by Suibne
