= Durrow, County Offaly =

Village in County Offaly, Ireland

Durrow Darú
- Town
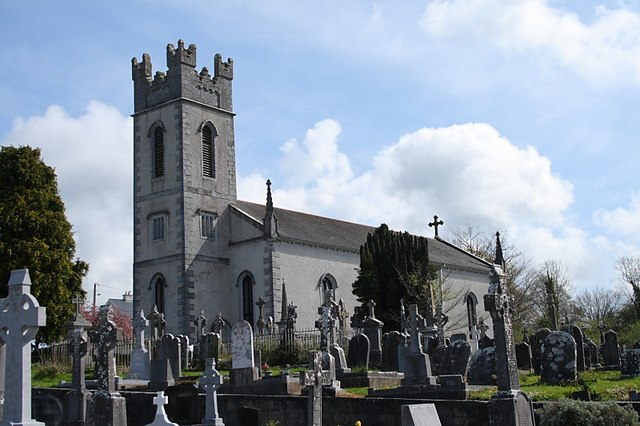
- Durrow Catholic church and graveyard

- Location in Ireland
- Coordinates: 53°20′N 7°31′W
- Country: Ireland
- Province: Leinster
- County: Offaly

Government
  - Dáil Éireann: Offaly
- Elevation: 77 m (253 ft)
- Time zone: UTC+0 (WET)
  - Summer (DST): UTC-1 (IST (WEST))
- Area code: 057

Durrow (Irish: Darú, meaning 'plain of the oaks') is a small rural village and townland in County Offaly, Ireland. Durrow is located on the N52 off the N6 road between Kilbeggan (in County Westmeath) and Tullamore (in County Offaly).

Durrow Abbey, surrounded by woods, is one of Ireland's most important early Christian monasteries founded by Saint Colmcille. Some mistakenly assign County Laois as the location of this particular monastic settlement due to the presence of a larger town in Laois called Durrow.

== Monastery ==
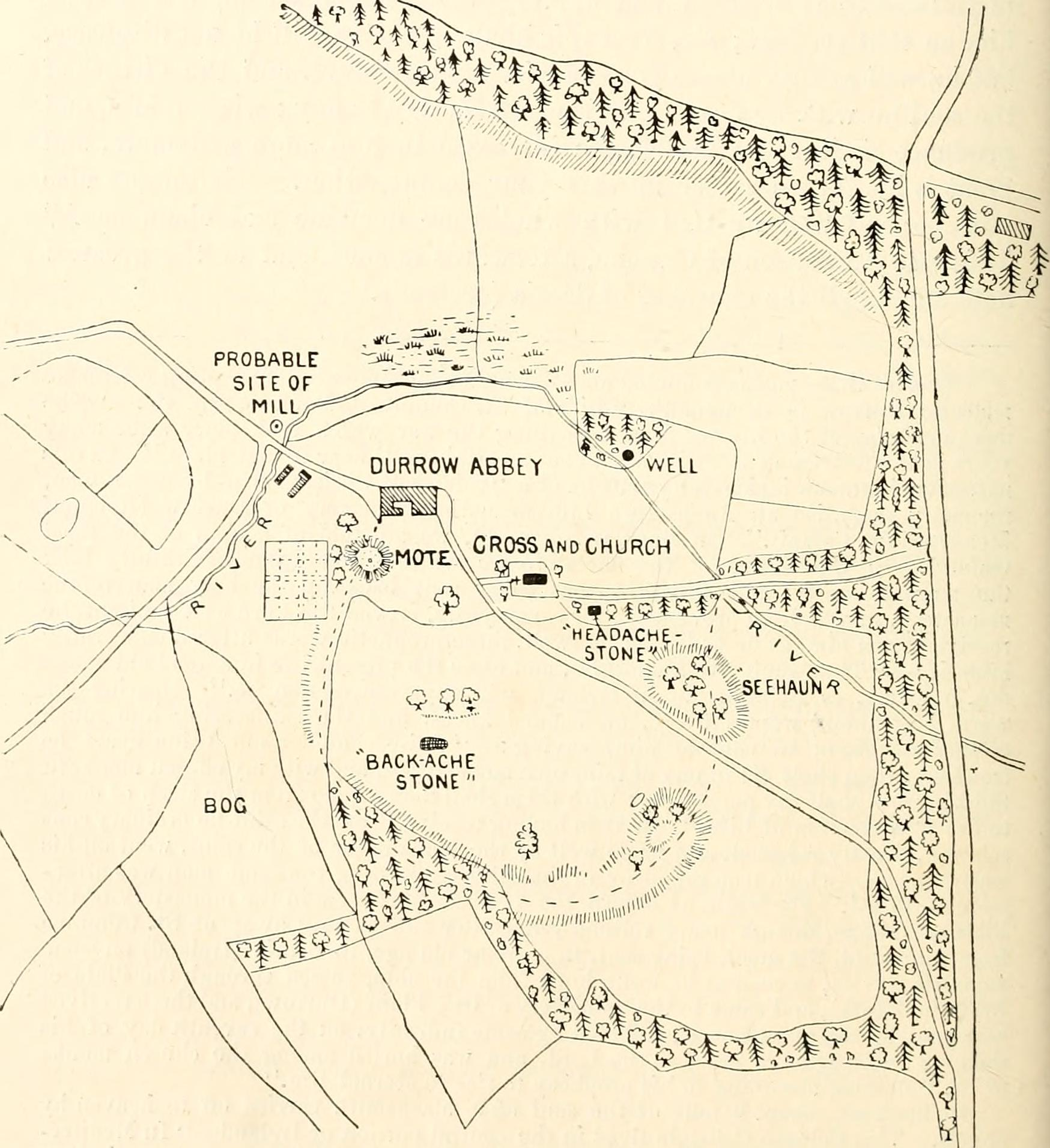
19th-century Durrow

Iona was established in exile and during that time Colum Cille yearned for monasteries in Ireland. The poem 'An Exile's Dream' specifically indicates Durrow as location for a monastery. Durrow was then part of the territory of Tethba, which now lies mostly in County Longford. It was also located near one of Ireland's five ancient routes, Slighe Mór. However, no accounts survive of what Colum Cille's monastery was like at its foundation. The monastic enclosure of Durrow can be seen in the aerial photographs of the surrounding lands. South of the monastery is evidence of Early Christian burials, unearthed by excavation of burial mounds by the National Museum of Ireland. Bede mentions that many more monasteries sprang from Durrow.

== Control ==
Patronage shifted during the millennium that followed the monastery's establishment. The Kings of Meath, Kings of Tethba and the MacGeoghegans, as well as chieftains known as Cinél Fiachach supported the monastery. This support did not permit them to appoint its abbot, who was selected from Colum Cille's own extended family at the start. Later rule of the Columban monasteries would be dominated by certain families who became hereditary rulers forming ecclesiastical dynasties.

Uí Néill association was also important and in 763 Domnall, King of Meath, was buried in the graveyard of Durrow. In 764 a war was fought with Clonmacnoise over burial rights, particularly the burial site of future Kings of Meath and in 776 the men of Durrow were involved in a raid upon Munster.

== See also ==
- Book of Durrow
- Colum Cille
- Durrow Abbey
- List of abbeys and priories in Ireland (County Offaly)
- List of towns and villages in Ireland
