= Iona =

Island off the west coast of Scotland

Ì Chaluim Chille (Gaelic)
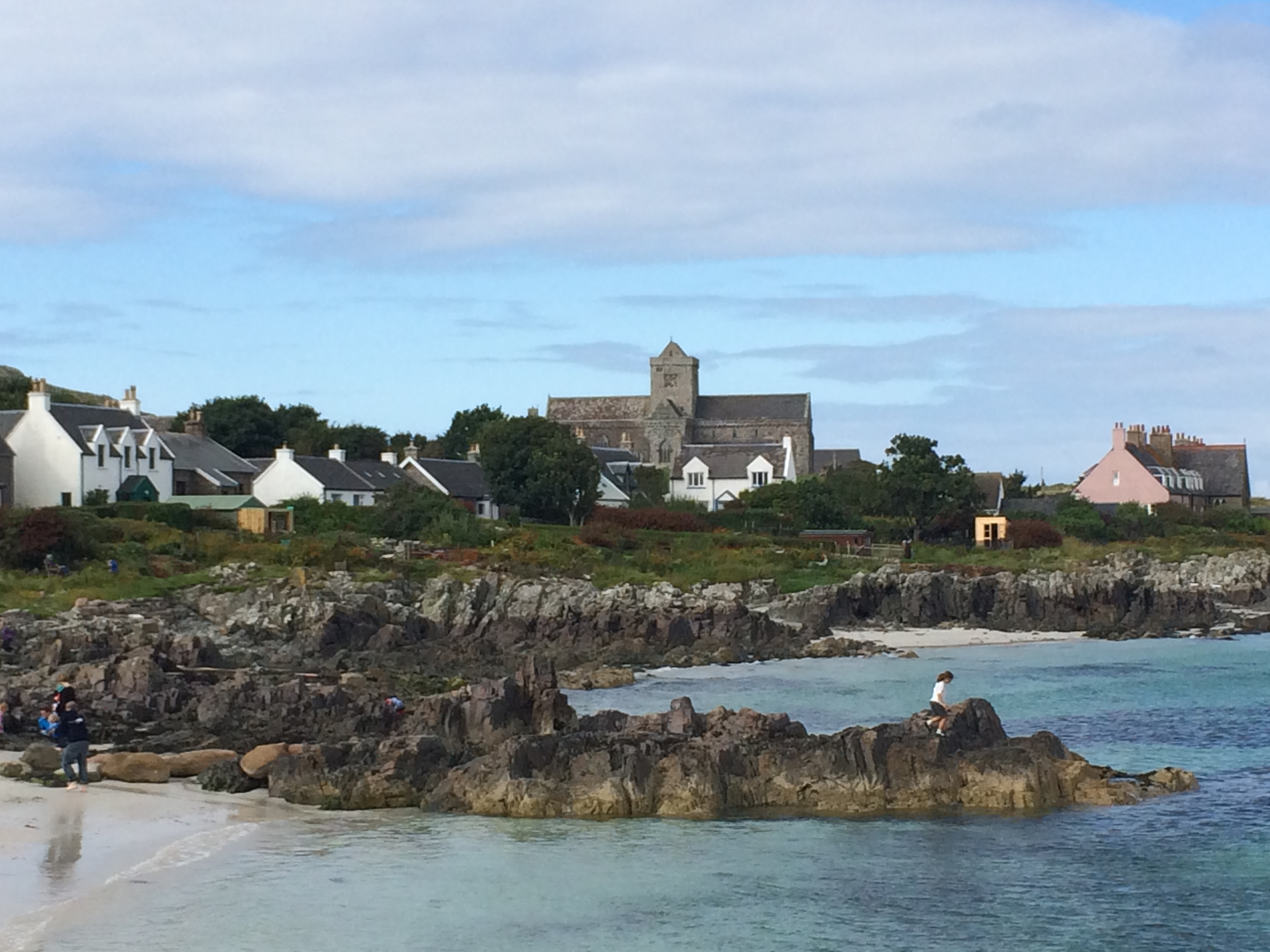
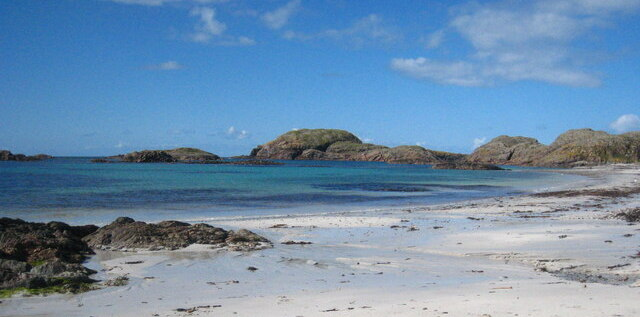
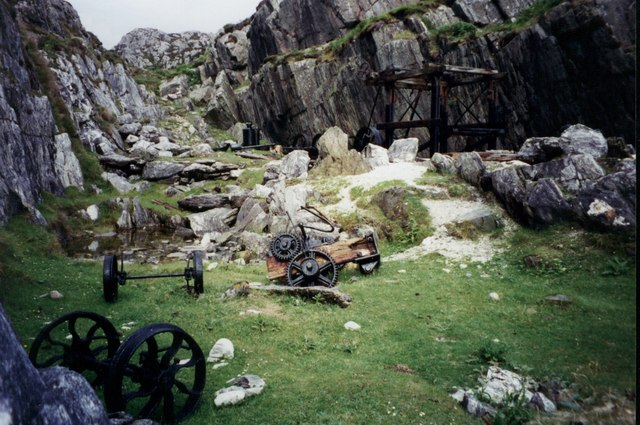
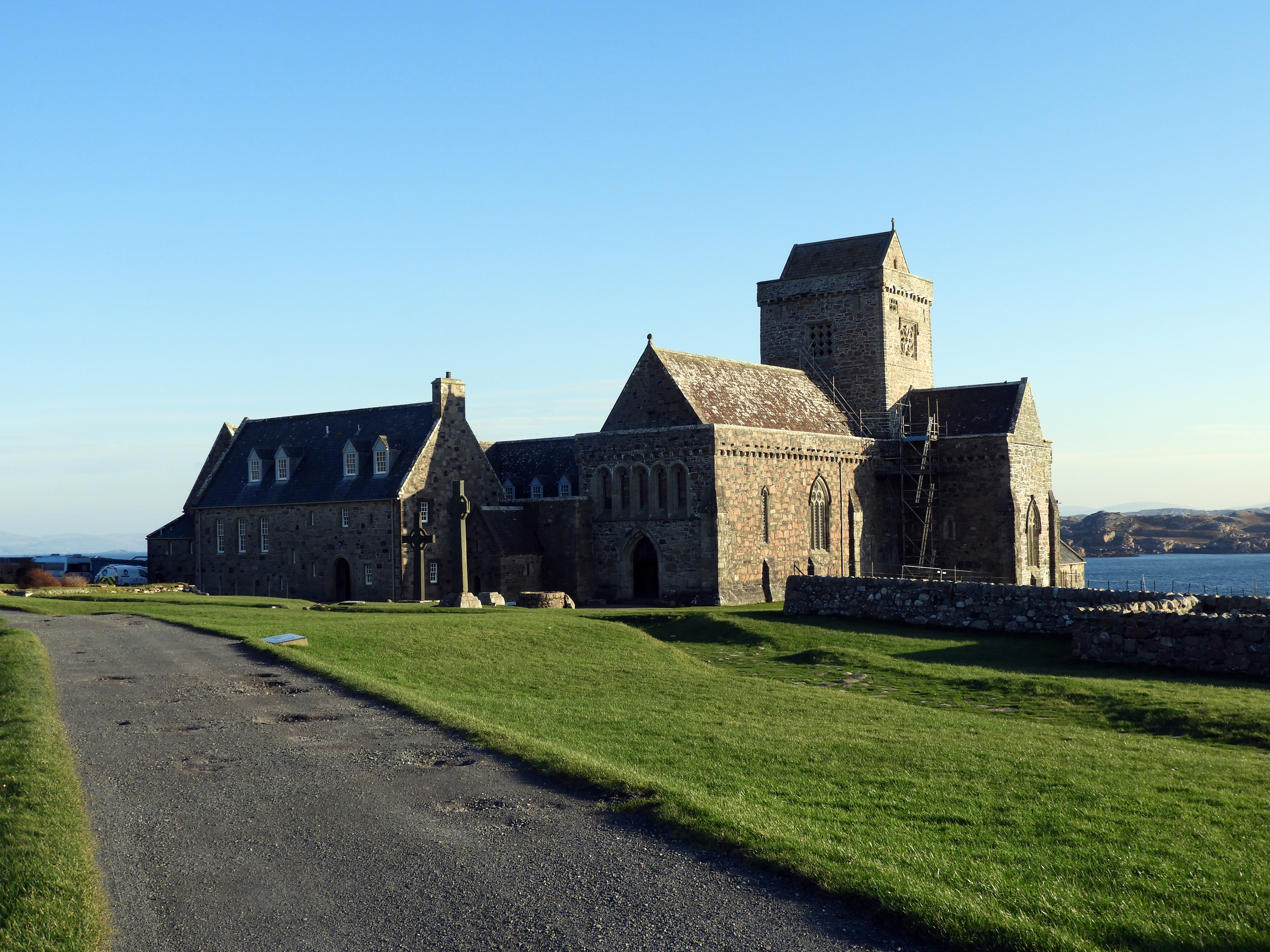
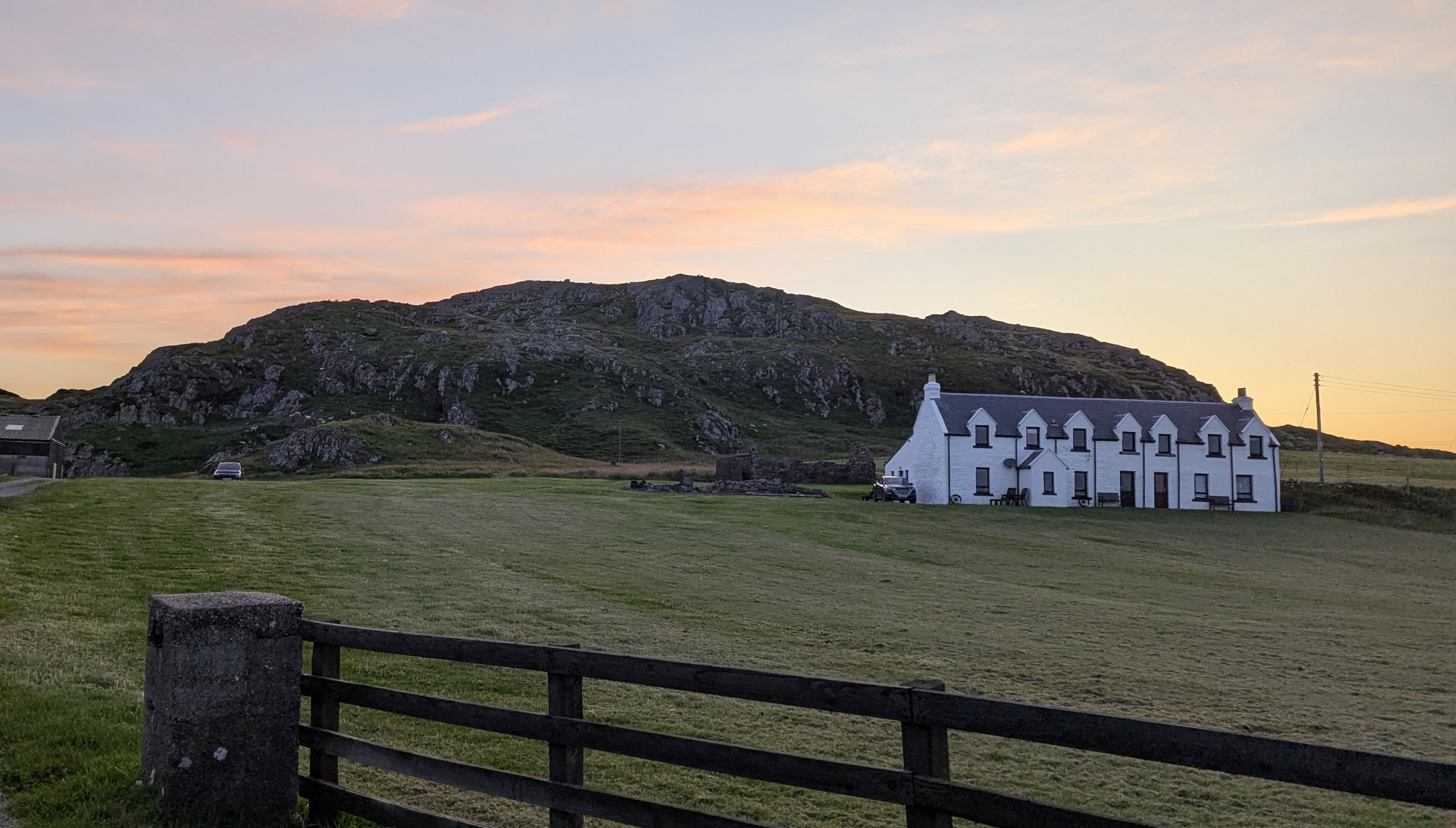
- Baile Mòr harbour Camas Cuil an t-Saimh Iona Marble Quarry Iona Abbey Dun Ì Iona seen from the east

Location
- Iona shown next to Mull Iona shown within Argyll and Bute Iona shown within Scotland
- OS grid reference: NM275245
- Coordinates: 56°19′48″N 06°24′36″W

Name
- Gaelic pronunciation: [ˈiː ˈxal̪ˠɪm ˈçiʎə]

Physical geography
- Island group: Mull
- Area: 877 ha (3 3/8 sq mi)
- Area rank: 56
- Highest elevation: Dùn Ì, 101 m (331 ft)

Administration
- Council area: Argyll and Bute
- Country: Scotland
- Sovereign state: United Kingdom

Demographics
- Population: 178
- Population rank: 35=
- Population density: 20.3/km^{2} (53/sq mi)
- Largest settlement: Baile Mòr

Iona (Note: /aɪˈoʊnə/; Scottish Gaelic: Ì Chaluim Chille [ˈiː ˈxal̪ˠɪm ˈçiʎə], sometimes simply Ì) (Scots Gaelic: Ì Chaluim Chille [ˈiː ˈxal̪ˠɪm ˈçiʎə], Irish Gaelic: Í Cholm Cille or Oileán Í) is an island in the Inner Hebrides, off the Ross of Mull on the western coast of Scotland. It is mainly known for Iona Abbey, though there are other buildings on the island. Iona Abbey was a centre of Gaelic monasticism for three centuries, and is today known for its relative tranquillity and natural environment as well as for its importance to pilgrims. It is a tourist destination and a place for spiritual retreats. Its modern Scottish Gaelic name means "Iona of (Saint) Columba" (formerly anglicised as "Icolmkill").

Iona's resident population is about 180. In March 1980, the Hugh Fraser Foundation donated much of the main island (and its off-lying islands) to the current owner, the National Trust for Scotland. The abbey and some church buildings are owned by the Iona Cathedral Trust.

One publication, describing the religious significance of the island, says that the island is "known as the birthplace of Celtic Christianity in Scotland,” and notes that “St Columba came here in the year 563 to establish the Abbey, which still stands".

== Etymology ==
Because the Hebrides have been successively occupied by speakers of several languages since the Iron Age, many of its islands' names have more than one possible meaning. Nonetheless, few, if any, have accumulated as many different names over the centuries as the island now known in English as "Iona".

The place-name scholar William J. Watson has shown that the earliest recorded names of the island meant something like "yew-place". The element Ivo-, denoting "yew", occurs in inscriptions in the ogham alphabet (Iva-cattos [genitive], Iva-geni [genitive]) and in Gaulish names (Ivo-rix, Ivo-magus); it may also be the basis of early Gaelic names like Eógan (ogham: Ivo-genos). (Note: The name of the Gaulish god Ivavos, which has a similar origin, is associated with the healing-well of Evaux in France.) The island's name may also be related to the name of a mythological figure, Fer hÍ mac Eogabail, the foster-son of Manannán, whose forename meaning "man of the yew".

Coates (2006) disputes the "yew" interpretation due to a lack of archaeological evidence for yew on the island. Coates instead compares the Punic term ’y ("island, isolated place").

Mac an Tàilleir (2003) has analysed the more recent Gaelic names of Ì, (Note: For etymology of Ì and Latinised derivative Iona, see Watson (2004), pp. 87-90.) Ì Chaluim Chille and Eilean Idhe. He notes that the name Ì was "generally lengthened to avoid confusion" to Ì Chaluim Chille, which means "Calum's Iona" or "island of Calum's monastery". ("Calum"'s latinised form is "Columba".) This confusion would have arisen because ì, the original name of the island, would have been confused with the now-obsolete Gaelic noun ì, meaning "island", which was derived from the Old Norse word for island (ey). Eilean Idhe means "the isle of Iona", also known as Ì nam ban bòidheach ("the isle of beautiful women"). The modern English name comes from yet another variant, Ioua, which arose either from Adomnán's 7th-century attempt to make the Gaelic name fit Latin grammar, or spontaneously, as a derivative of Ivova ("yew place"). The change in the island's name from Ioua' to Iona, which is attested from c. 1274, resulted from a transcription error due to the similarity of "n" and "u" in Insular Minuscule script.

Despite the continuity of forms in Gaelic from the pre-Norse to the post-Norse era, Haswell-Smith (2004) speculates that the island's name may be connected with the Norse word Hiōe, meaning "island of the den of the brown bear". The medieval English-language version of the name was "Icolmkill" (and variants thereof).

Table of earliest forms (incomplete)
Form	Source	Language	Notes
Ioua insula	Adomnán's Vita Columbae (c. 700)	Latin	Adomnán calls Eigg Egea insula and Skye Scia insula
Hii, Hy	Bede's Historia ecclesiastica gentis Anglorum	Latin	
Eoa, Iae, Ie, I Cholaim Chille	Annals of Ulster	Irish, Latin	U563 Nauigatio Coluim Chille ad Insolam Iae "The journey of St Columba to Í"; U641 Naufragium scaphe familie Iae. "Shipwreck of a vessel of the community of Í."; U716 Pascha comotatur in Eoa ciuitate "The date of Easter is changed in the monastery of Í"); U717 Expulsio familie Ie "The expulsion of the community of Í"; U778 Niall...a nn-I Cholaim Chille "Niall... in Í Cholaim Chille"
Hi, Eu	Lebor na hUidre	Irish	Hi con ilur a mmartra "Hi with the multitude of its relics" in tan conucaib a chill hi tosuċ .i. Eu "the time he raised his church first i.e. Eu"
Eo	Walafrid Strabo (c. 831)	Latin	Insula Pictorum quaedam monstratur in oris fluctivago suspensa salo, cognominis Eo "On the coasts of the Picts is pointed out an isle poised in the rolling sea, whose name is Eo"
Euea insula	Life of St Cathróe of Metz	Latin	

=== Folk etymology ===
Murray (1966) claims that the "ancient" Gaelic name was Innis nan Druinich ("the isle of Druidic hermits"), but there is no evidence for the "ancient" use of such a name before the 19th century when it appears in the New Statistical Account and it may arise from a misunderstanding of the name Cladh nan Druineach, which means 'burial ground of the embroideresses or artificers' – a cemetery on the east shore of the island. He also repeats a Gaelic story (which he admits is apocryphal) that as Columba's coracle first drew close to the island one of his companions cried out "Chì mi i" meaning "I see her" and that Columba's response was "Henceforth we shall call her Ì".

== Geology ==
The geology of Iona is quite complex given the island's size and is quite distinct from that of nearby Mull. About half of the island's bedrock is Scourian gneiss assigned to the Lewisian complex and dating from the Archaean eon making it some of the oldest rock in Britain and indeed Europe. Closely associated with these gneisses are mylonite and meta-anorthosite and melagabbro. Along the eastern coast facing Mull are steeply dipping Neoproterozoic age metaconglomerates, metasandstones, metamudstones and hornfelsed metasiltstones ascribed to the Iona Group, described traditionally as Torridonian. In the southwest and on parts of the west coast are pelites and semipelites of Archaean to Proterozoic age. There are small outcrops of Silurian age pink granite on southeastern beaches, similar to those of the Ross of Mull pluton cross the sound to the east. Numerous geological faults cross the island, many in an E-W or NW-SE alignment. Devonian aged microdiorite dykes are found in places and some of these are themselves cut by Palaeocene age camptonite and monchiquite dykes ascribed to the "Iona-Ross of Mull dyke swarm". More recent sedimentary deposits of Quaternary age include both present day beach deposits and raised marine deposits around Iona as well as some restricted areas of blown sand.

== Geography ==
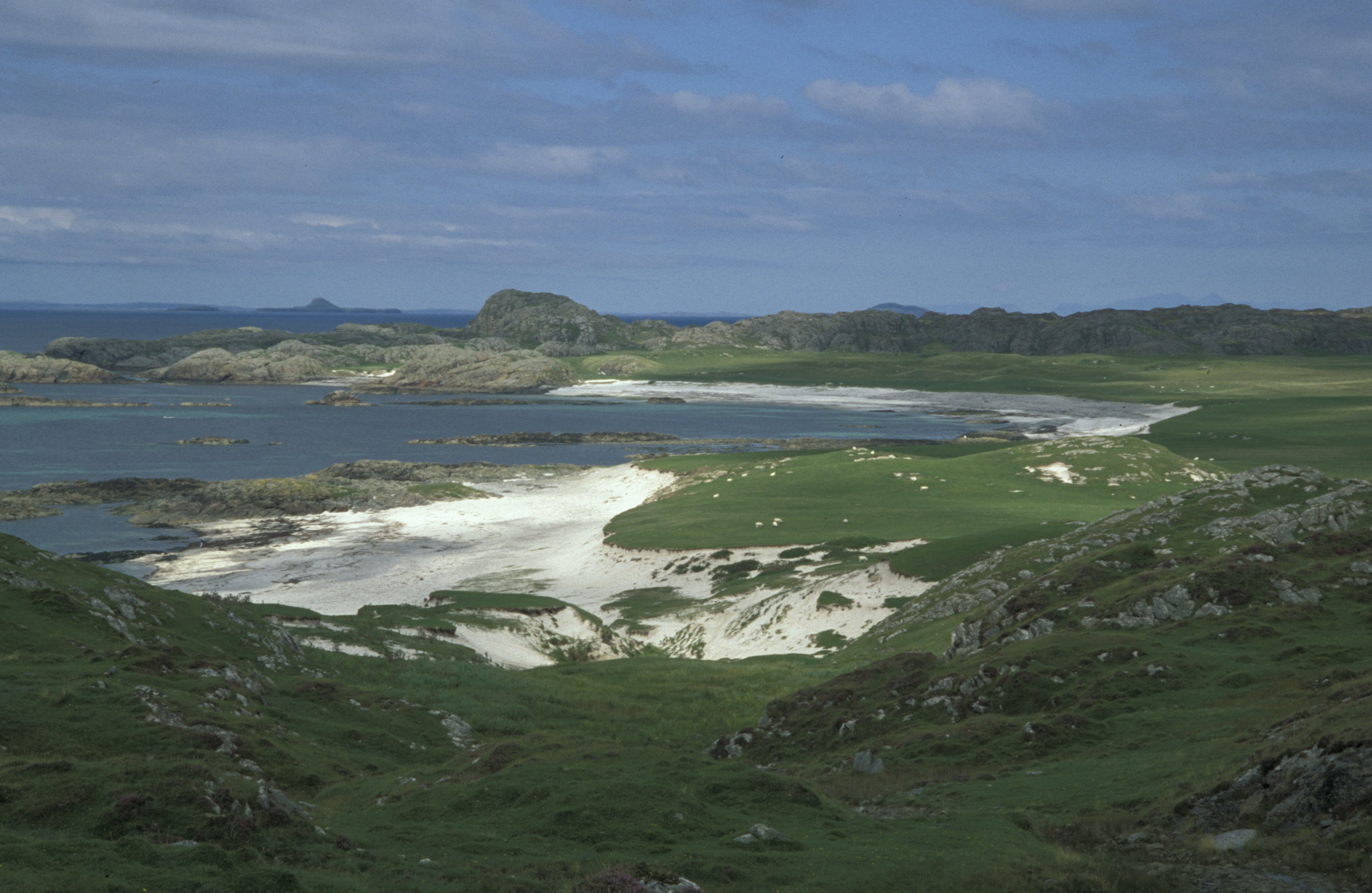
The Bay at the Back of the Ocean

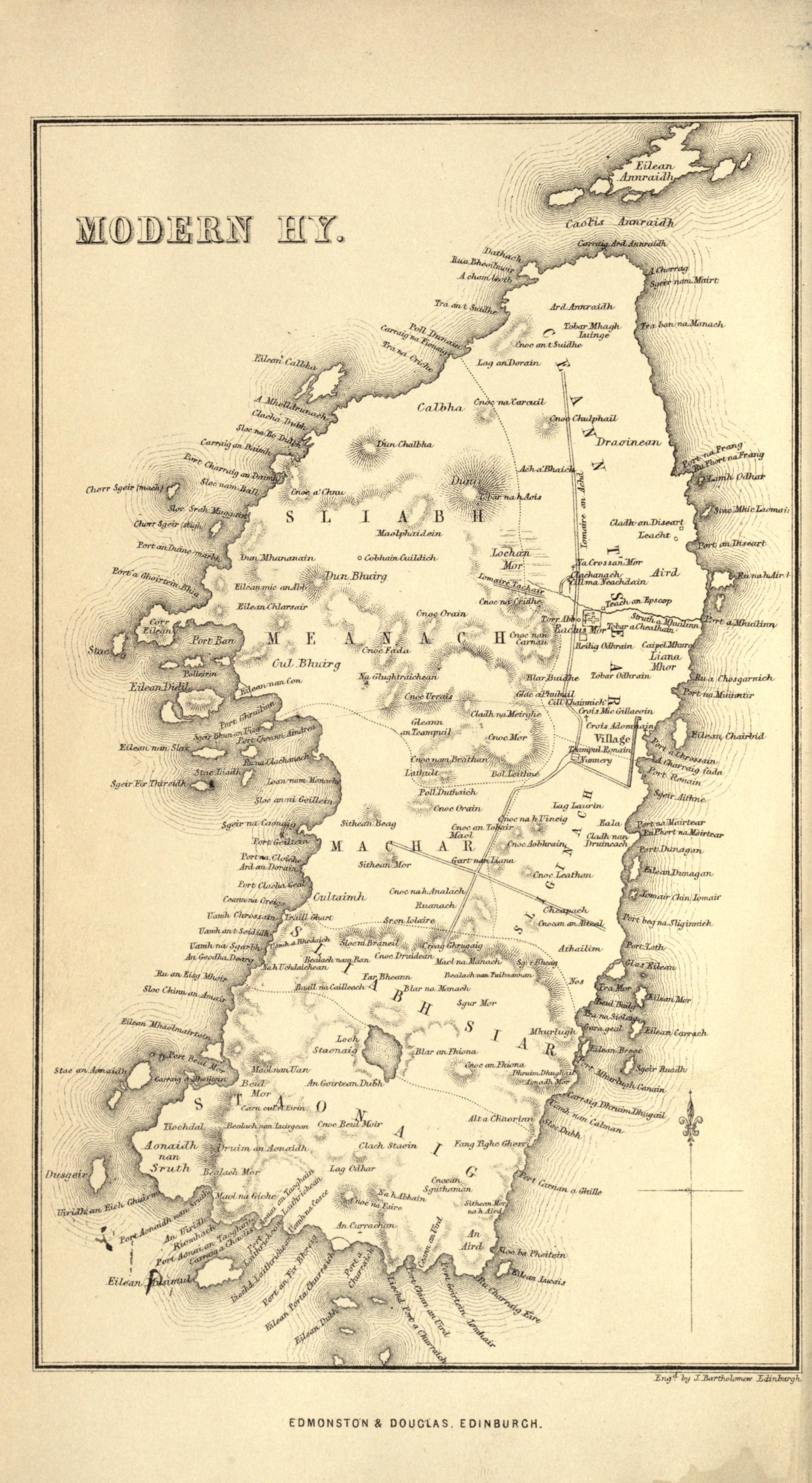
Map of 1874, with subdivisions: *Ceann Tsear *Sliabh Meanach *Machar *Sliginach *Sliabh Siar *Staonaig

Iona lies about 2 kilometres (1 mile) from the coast of Mull. It is about 2 km (1 mi) wide and 6 km (4 mi) long with a resident population of 125. Like other places swept by ocean breezes, there are few trees; most of them are near the parish church.

Iona's highest point is Dùn Ì, 101 m (331 ft). Iona's geographical features include the Bay at the Back of the Ocean and Càrn Cùl ri Éirinn (the Hill/Cairn of [turning the] Back to Ireland), said to be adjacent to the beach where Columba first landed.

The main settlement, located at St Ronan's Bay on the eastern side of the island, is called Baile Mòr and is also known locally as "The Village". The primary school, post office, the island's two hotels, the Bishop's House and the ruins of the Nunnery are here. The Abbey and MacLeod Centre are a short walk to the north. Port Bàn (white port) beach on the west side of the island is home to the Iona Beach Party.

There are numerous offshore islets and skerries: Eilean Annraidh (island of storm) and Eilean Chalbha (calf island) to the north, Rèidh Eilean and Stac MhicMhurchaidh to the west and Eilean Mùsimul (mouse holm island) and Soa Island to the south are amongst the largest. The steamer Cathcart Park carrying a cargo of salt from Runcorn to Wick ran aground on Soa on 15 April 1912, the crew of 11 escaping in two boats. (Note: The record is tentative, the press cutting the record refers to identifying "'Sheep Island', one of the Torran Rocks near Iona" but there is no other obvious contender.)

=== Subdivision ===
On a map of 1874, the following territorial subdivision is indicated (from north to south):

- Ceann Tsear (East Head);
- Sliabh Meanach (Middle Mountain);
- Machar (Low-lying Grassy Plain);
- Sliginach (Shelly Area);
- Sliabh Siar (Rear Mountain);
- Staonaig (Sloping Ground).

== History ==
=== Dál Riata ===
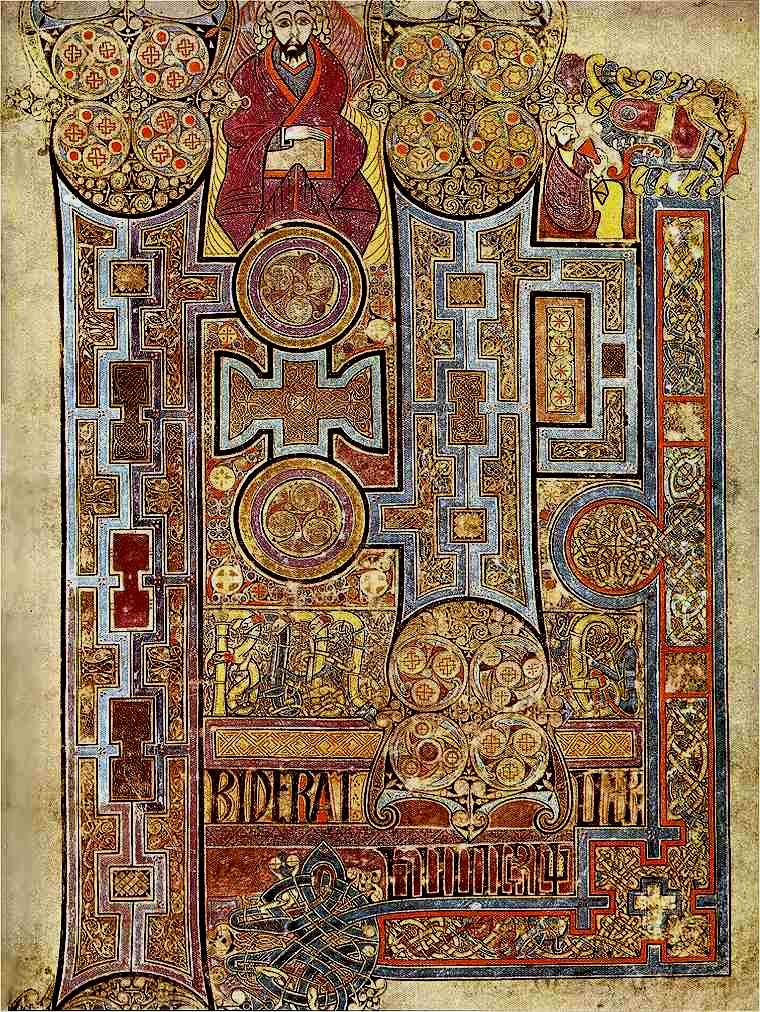
The Book of Kells – Gospel of John

In the early Historic Period Iona lay within the Gaelic kingdom of Dál Riata, in the region controlled by the Cenél Loairn (i.e. Lorn, as it was then). The island was the site of a highly important monastery (see Iona Abbey) during the Early Middle Ages. The monastery was founded in 563 by the monk Columba, also known as Colm Cille, who sailed here from Ireland to live the monastic life. Much later legends (a thousand years later, and without any good evidence) said that he had been exiled from his native Ireland as a result of his involvement in the Battle of Cul Dreimhne. Columba and twelve companions went into exile on Iona and founded a monastery there. The monastery was hugely successful and may have played a role in the conversion to Christianity of the Picts and Gaels of present-day Scotland in the late 6th century, and was certainly central to the conversion of the Anglo-Saxon kingdom of Northumbria in 635. Many satellite institutions were founded, and Iona became the centre of one of the most important monastic systems in Great Britain and Ireland.

By the last quarter of the sixth century Iona lacked adequate woodland resources to meet the needs of the Columban community and the monks were obliged to source the stakes and withies for wattle to build a guest house from a layman called Findchan, who may have been based on the Ross of Mull.

Iona became a renowned centre of learning, and its scriptorium produced highly important documents, probably including the original texts of the Iona Chronicle, thought to be the source for the early Irish annals. The monastery is often associated with the distinctive practices and traditions known as Celtic Christianity. In particular, Iona was a major supporter of the "Celtic" system for calculating the date of Easter at the time of the Easter controversy, which pitted supporters of the Celtic system against those favouring the "Roman" system used elsewhere in Western Christianity. The controversy weakened Iona's ties to Northumbria, which adopted the Roman system at the Synod of Whitby in 664, and to Pictland, which followed suit in the early 8th century. Iona itself did not adopt the Roman system until 715, according to the Anglo-Saxon historian Bede. Iona's prominence was further diminished over the next centuries as a result of Viking raids and the rise of other powerful monasteries in the system, such as the Abbey of Kells.

The Book of Kells may have been produced or begun on Iona towards the end of the 8th century. Around this time the island's exemplary high crosses were sculpted; these may be the first such crosses to contain the ring around the intersection that became characteristic of the "Celtic cross". The series of Viking raids on Iona began in 794 and, after its treasures had been plundered many times, Columba's relics were removed and divided two ways between Scotland and Ireland in 849 as the monastery was abandoned.

=== Kingdom of the Isles ===
As the Norse domination of the west coast of Scotland advanced, Iona became part of the Kingdom of the Isles. The Norse Rex plurimarum insularum Amlaíb Cuarán died in 980 or 981 whilst in "religious retirement" on Iona. Nonetheless, the island was sacked twice by his successors, on Christmas night 986 and again in 987. Although Iona was never again important to Ireland, it rose to prominence once more in Scotland following the establishment of the Kingdom of Scotland in the later 9th century; the ruling dynasty of Scotland traced its origin to Iona, and the island thus became an important spiritual centre for the new kingdom, with many of its early kings buried there. However, a campaign by Magnus Barelegs led to the formal acknowledgement of Norwegian control of Argyll, in 1098.

Somerled, the brother-in-law of Norway's governor of the region (the King of the Isles), launched a revolt and made the kingdom independent. A convent for Augustinian nuns was established in about 1208, with Bethóc, Somerled's daughter, as first prioress. The present buildings are of the Benedictine abbey, Iona Abbey, from about 1203, dissolved at the Reformation.

On Somerled's death, nominal Norwegian overlordship of the Kingdom was re-established, but de facto control was split between Somerled's sons, and his brother-in-law.

=== Kingdom of Scotland ===
Following the 1266 Treaty of Perth the Hebrides were transferred from Norwegian to Scottish overlordship. At the end of the century, King John Balliol was challenged for the throne by Robert the Bruce. By this point, Somerled's descendants had split into three groups, the MacRory, MacDougalls, and MacDonalds. The MacDougalls backed Balliol, so when he was defeated by Bruce, the latter exiled the MacDougalls and transferred their island territories to the MacDonalds; by marrying the heir of the MacRorys, the heir of the MacDonalds re-unified most of Somerled's realm, creating the Lordship of the Isles, under nominal Scottish authority. Iona, which had been a MacDougall territory (together with the rest of Lorn), was given to the Campbells, where it remained for half a century.

In 1354, though in exile and without control of his ancestral lands, John, the MacDougall heir, quitclaimed any rights he had over Mull and Iona to the Lord of the Isles (though this had no meaningful effect at the time). When Robert's son, David II, became king, he spent some time in English captivity; following his release, in 1357, he restored MacDougall authority over Lorn. The 1354 quitclaim, which seems to have been an attempt to ensure peace in just such an eventuality, took automatic effect, splitting Mull and Iona from Lorn, and making it subject to the Lordship of the Isles. Iona remained part of the Lordship of the Isles for the next century and a half.

Following the 1491 Raid on Ross, the Lordship of the Isles was dismantled, and Scotland gained full control of Iona for the second time. The monastery and nunnery continued to be active until the Reformation, when buildings were demolished and all but three of the 360 carved crosses destroyed. The Augustine nunnery now only survives as a number of 13th-century ruins, including a church and cloister. By the 1760s little more of the nunnery remained standing than at present, though it is the most complete remnant of a medieval nunnery in Scotland.

=== Post-Union ===
After a visit in 1773, the English writer Samuel Johnson remarked:

The island, which was once the metropolis of learning and piety, now has no school for education, nor temple for worship.

He estimated the population of the village at 70 families or perhaps 350 inhabitants.

In the 19th century, green-streaked marble was commercially mined in the south-east of Iona; the quarry and machinery survive, see "Marble Quarry remains" below.

=== Fishing ===
The Annual Reports of the Fishery Board for Scotland provide an insight into the state of fishing from Iona in the years before the First World War. The unusually larger result for 1894 was explained as follows "over £1,900 worth of fish landed by visiting crews." While fishing dropped off drastically at the turn of the century, it staged a modest recovery in the following years.

Fishery Statistics

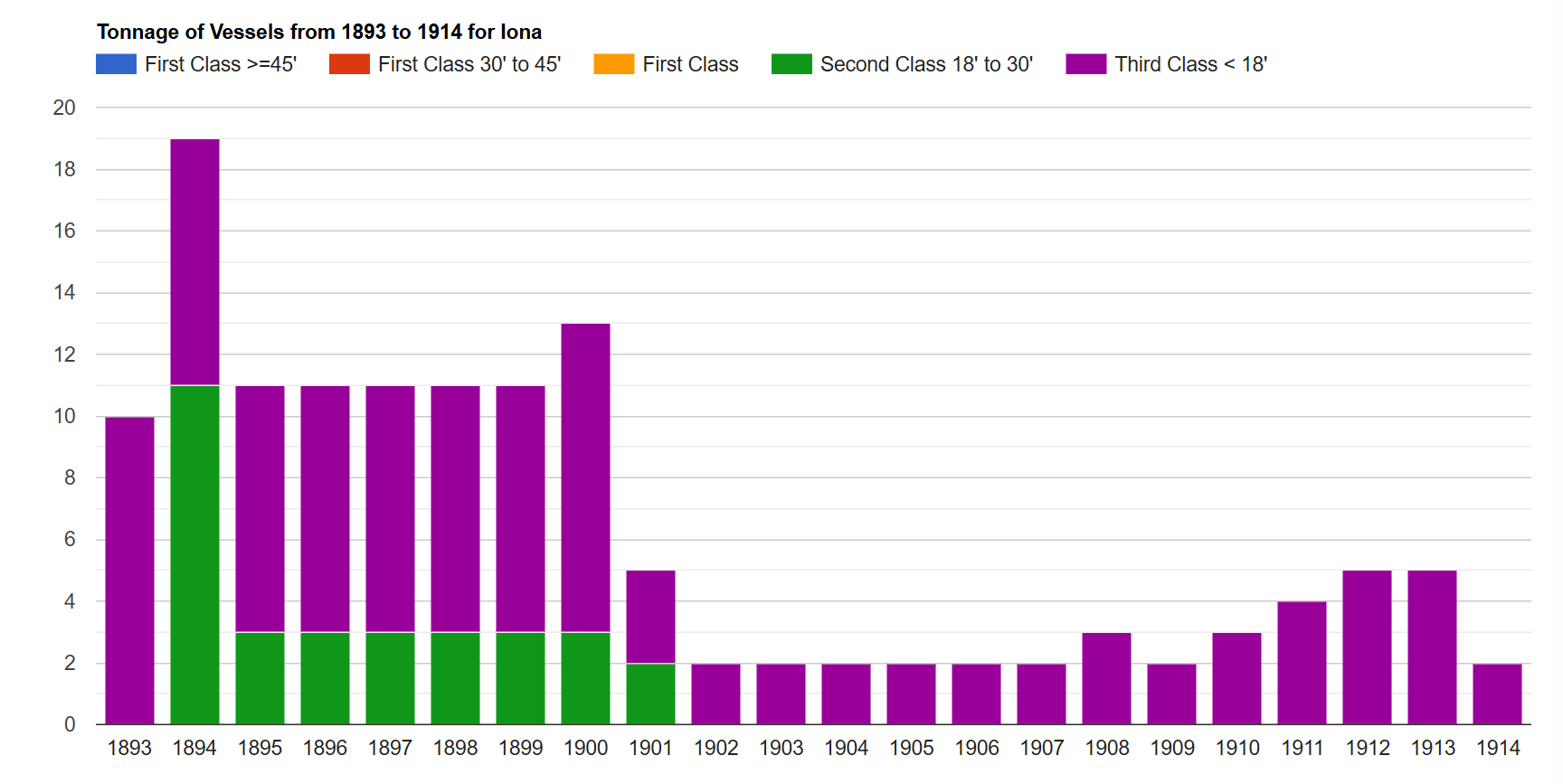
Tonnage of vessels

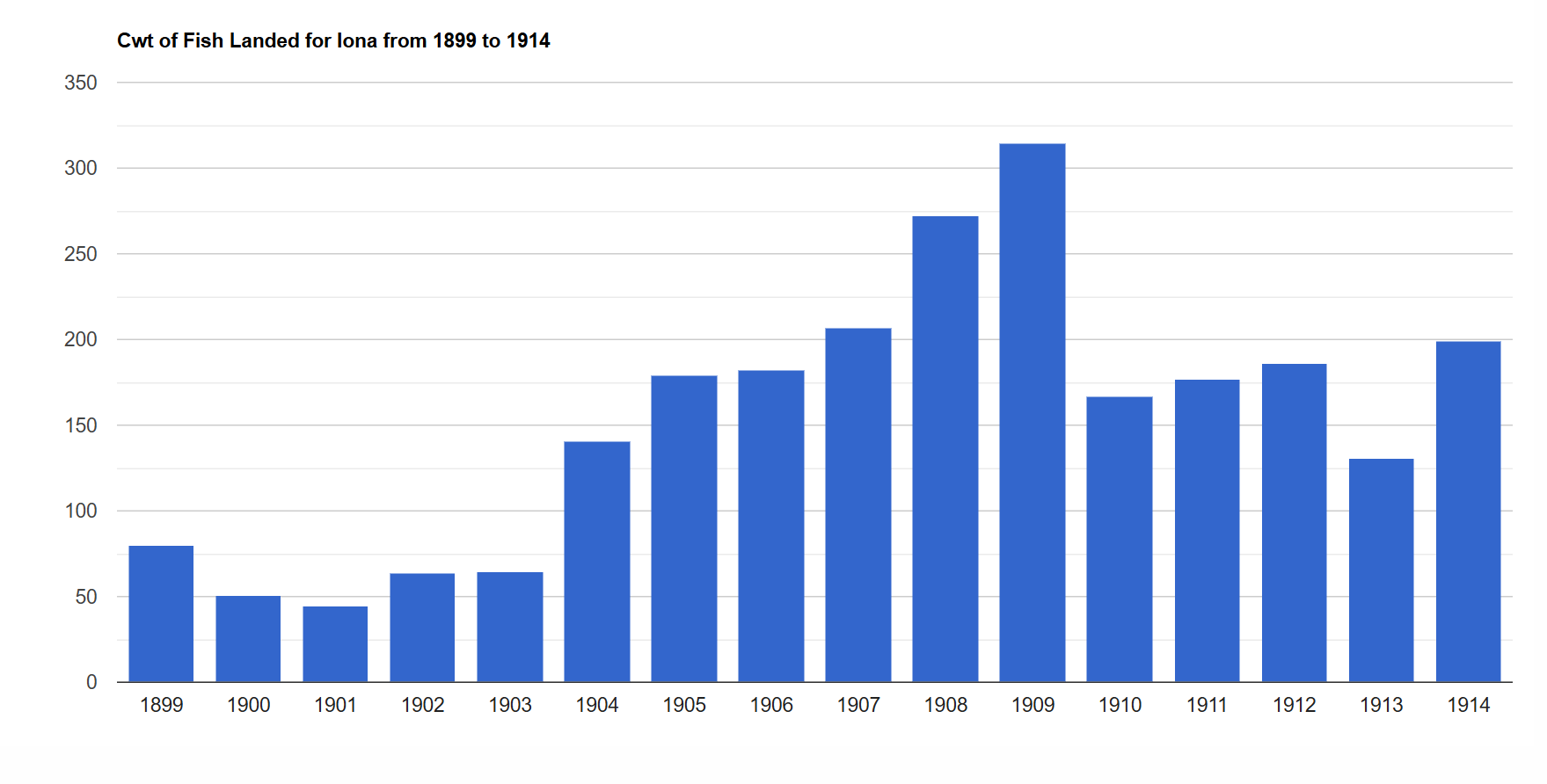
Cwt of fish landed

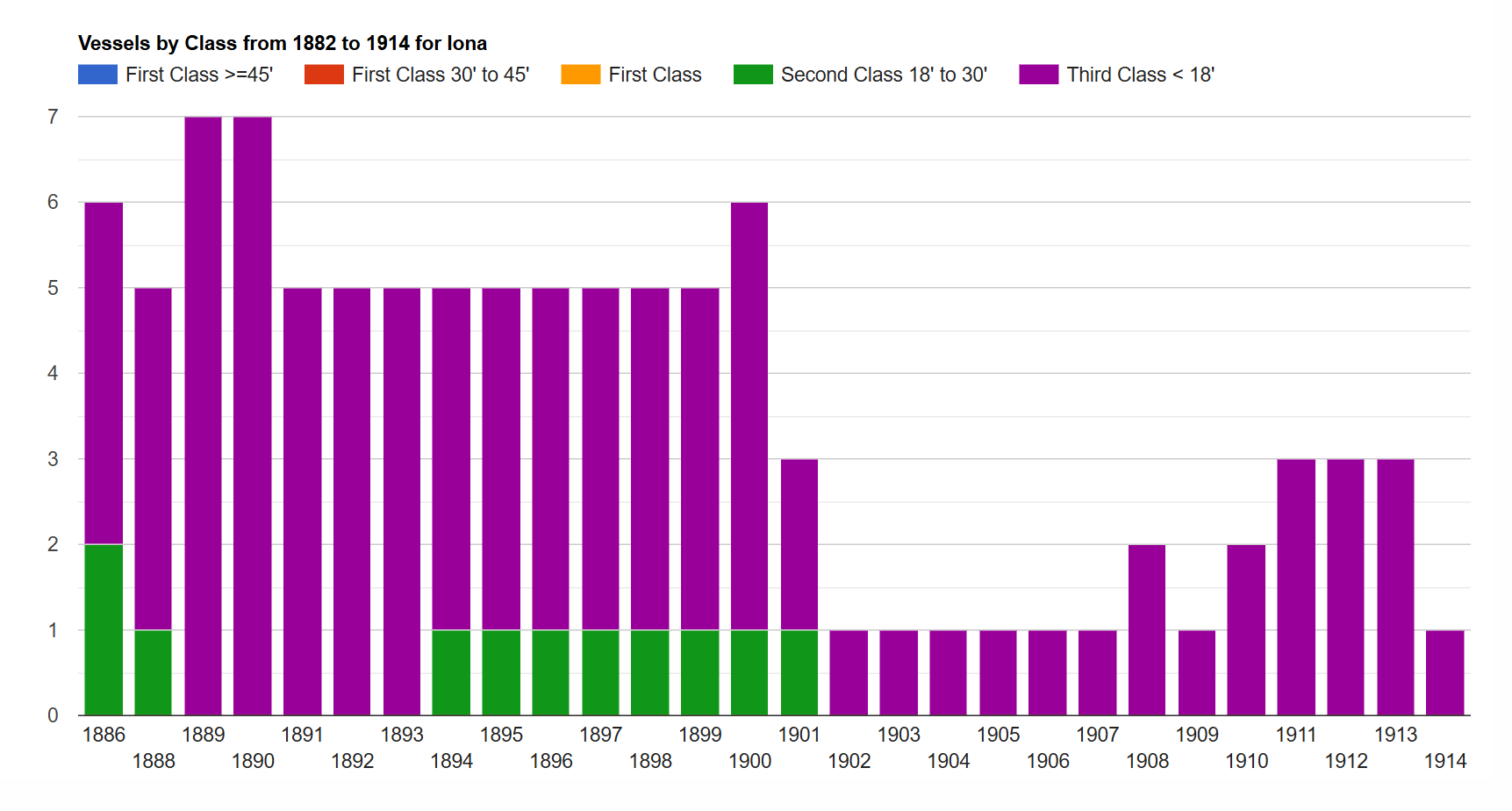
Vessels by class

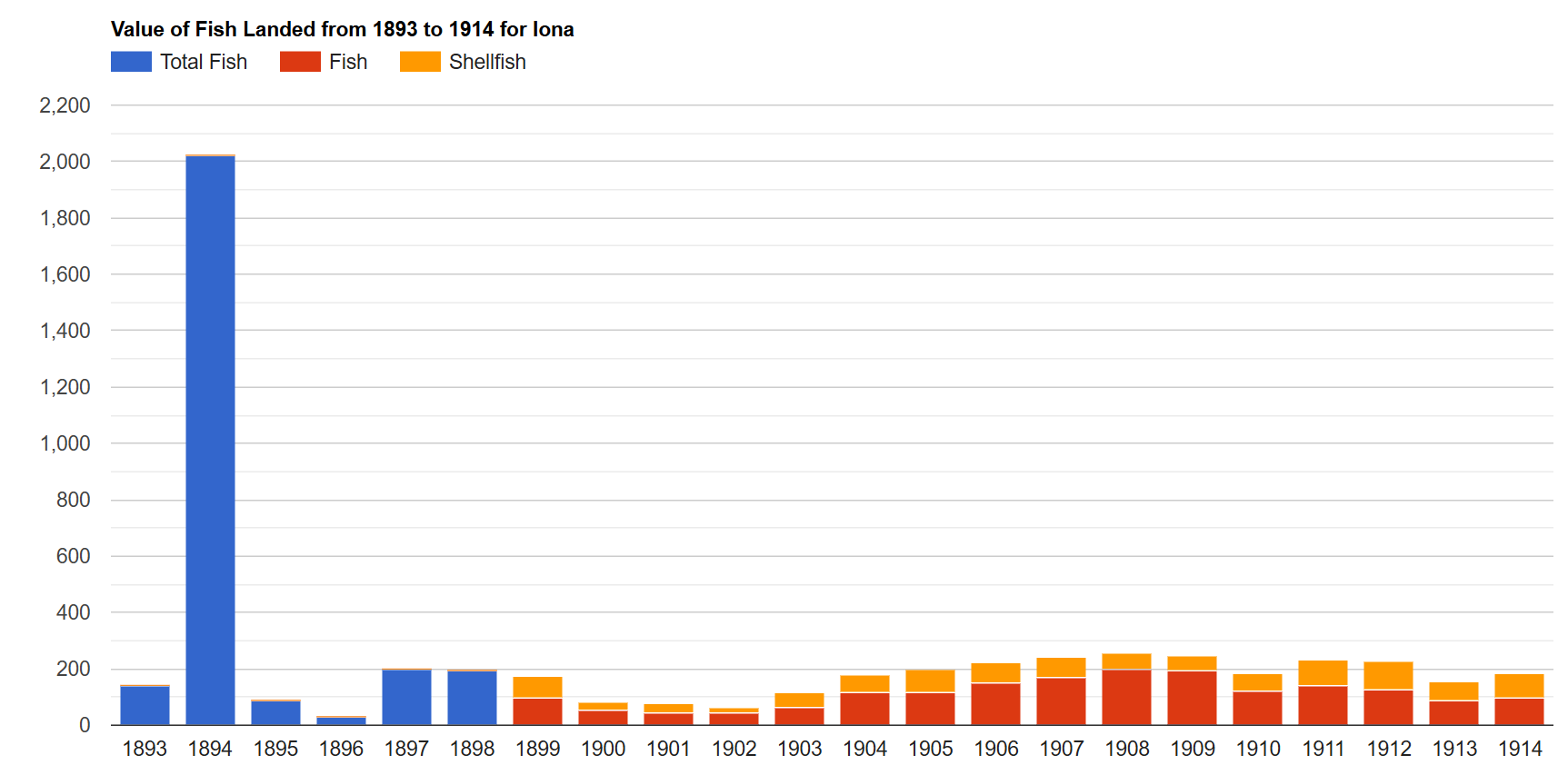
Value (£) of fish landed

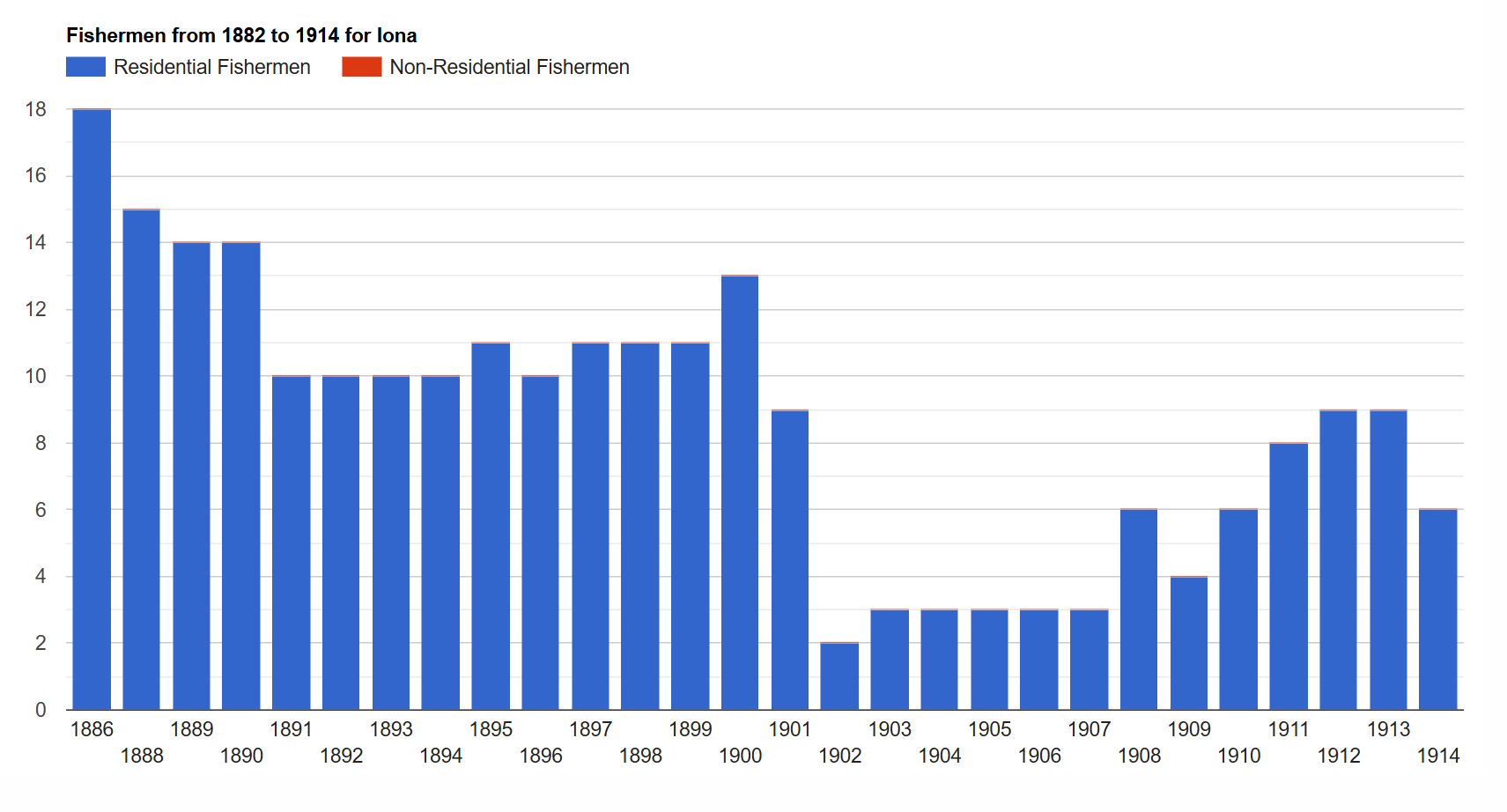
Fishermen

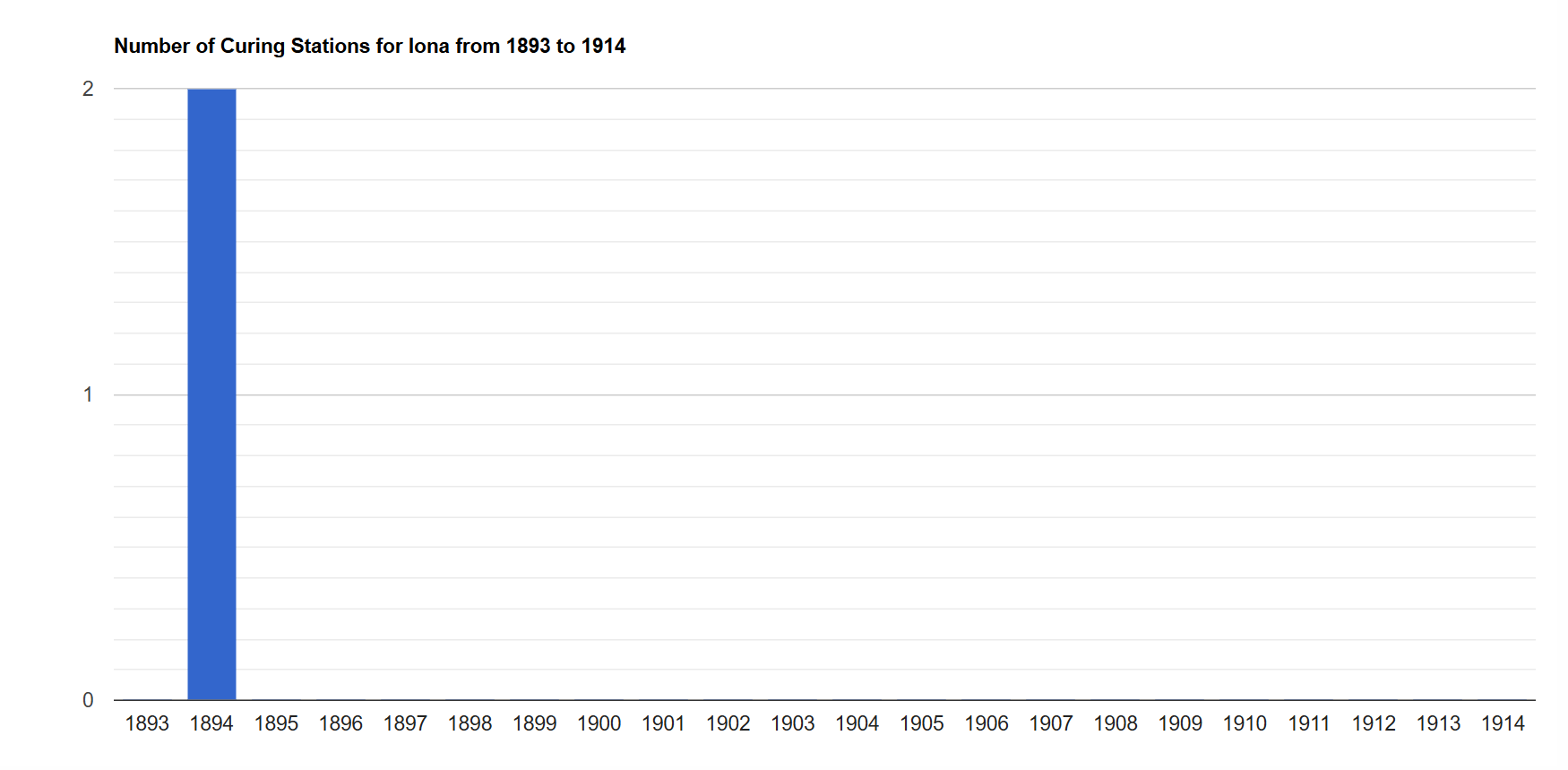
Number of curing stations

== Iona Abbey ==
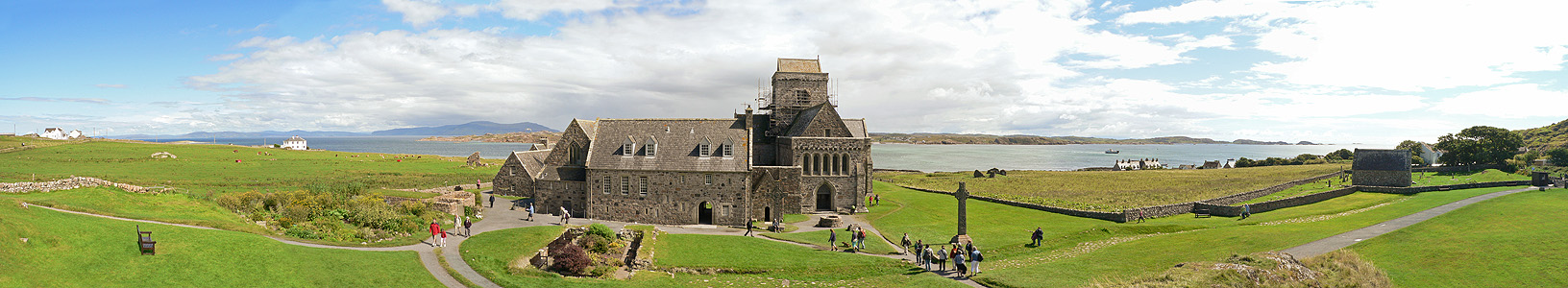
Panoramic view

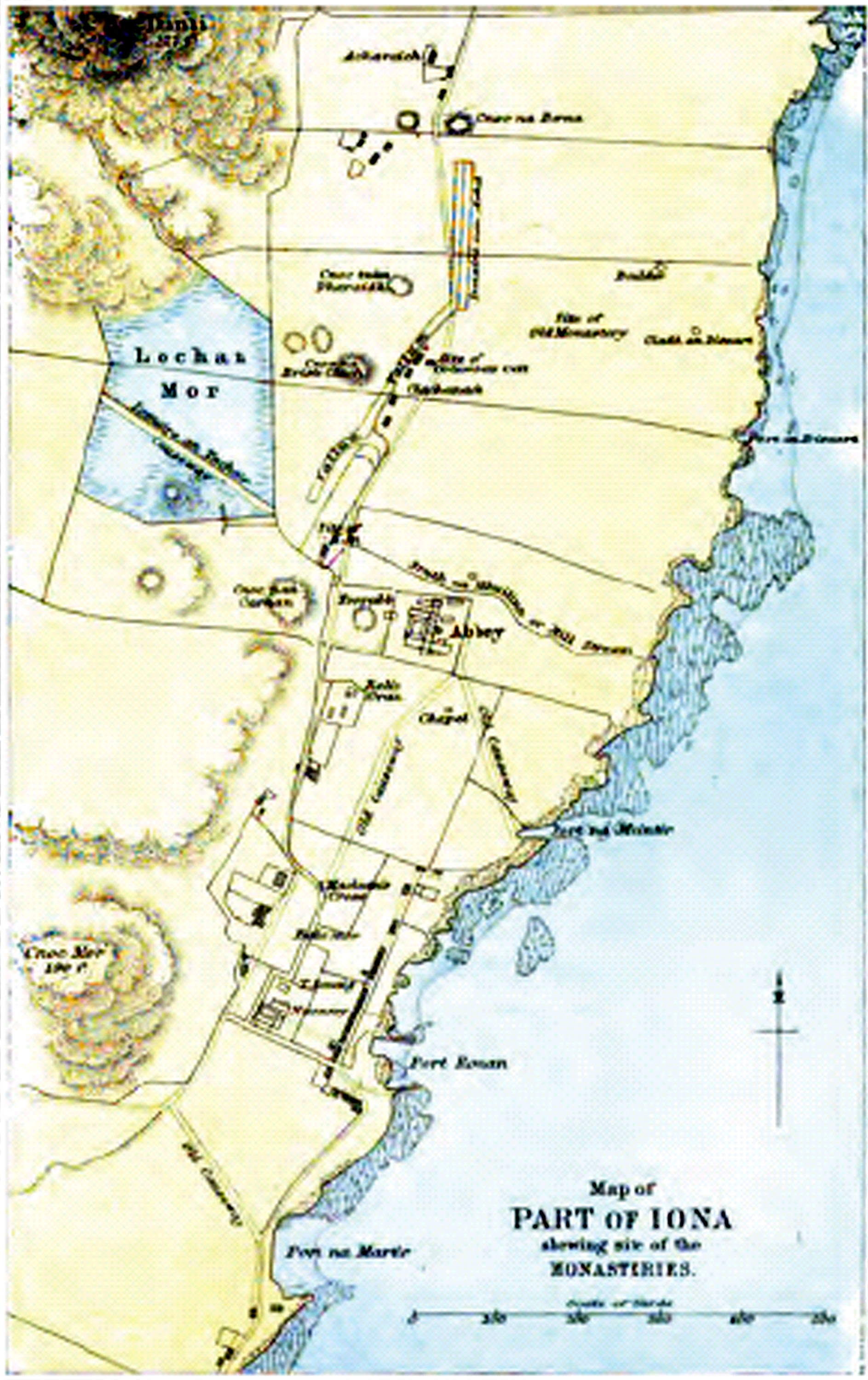
Enlargement, showing the location of the abbey and monasteries

Iona Abbey, now an ecumenical church, is of particular historical and religious interest to pilgrims and visitors alike. It is the most elaborate and best-preserved ecclesiastical building surviving from the Middle Ages in the Western Isles of Scotland. Though modest in scale in comparison to medieval abbeys elsewhere in Western Europe, it has a wealth of fine architectural detail and monuments of many periods. The enabling endowments, the core economic strength and life-blood of the Abbey came from successive Clan Donald Lords of the Isles and for 300 years were regularly confirmed, honoured, protected, increased and expanded. Endowments had "carta confirmations" and additional ones made by them during the 14th and 15th centuries as late as 1440 and 1485. Donald of Harlaw (1386–1421): "gave lands to the monastery of Iona, and every immunity which the monastery of Iona had from his ancestors before him" – MacVurich. It might be expressed that Iona Abbey had been acting as a "(holy owned) land trust" for Clan Donald from Somerled who built St Oran's Chapel.

The 8th Duke of Argyll presented the sacred buildings and sites of the island to the Iona Cathedral trust in 1899. Historic Environment Scotland also recommends visiting the Augustinian nunnery, "the most complete nunnery complex to survive in Scotland". The nunnery was founded by Somerled's son, Reginald, as was Iona Abbey and Saddell Abbey. Reginald's sister, Beathag, was the first Prioress of the Iona Nunnery. The nunnery declined after the Scottish Reformation but was still used as a burial place for women.

In front of the Abbey stands the 9th-century St Martin's Cross, one of the best-preserved Celtic crosses in the British Isles, and a replica of the 8th-century St John's Cross (original fragments in the Abbey museum).

The ancient burial ground, called the Rèilig Odhrain (Eng: Oran's "burial place" or "cemetery"), contains the 12th-century chapel built by Somerled where the Lords of the Isles were buried and named after St Odhrán (said to be Columba's uncle). It was restored at the same time as the Abbey itself. It contains a number of medieval grave monuments. The abbey graveyard is said to contain the graves of many early Scottish Kings, as well as Norse kings from Ireland and Norway. Iona became the burial site for the kings of Dál Riata and their successors. Notable burials there include:

- Cináed mac Ailpín, king of the Picts (also known today as "Kenneth I of Scotland");
- Domnall mac Causantín, alternatively "king of the Picts" or "king of Scotland" ("Donald II");
- Máel Coluim mac Domnaill, king of Scotland ("Malcolm I");
- Donnchad mac Crínáin, king of Scotland ("Duncan I");
- Mac Bethad mac Findlaích, king of Scotland ("Macbeth");
- Domnall mac Donnchada, king of Scotland ("Donald III");
- John Smith, Labour Party Leader.

In 1549 an inventory of 48 Scottish, 8 Norwegian and 4 Irish kings was recorded. None of these graves are now identifiable (their inscriptions were reported to have worn away at the end of the 17th century). Saint Baithin and Saint Failbhe may also be buried on the island. The Abbey graveyard is also the final resting place of John Smith, the former Labour Party leader, who loved Iona. His grave is marked with an epitaph quoting Alexander Pope: "An honest man's the noblest work of God".

Limited archaeological investigations commissioned by the National Trust for Scotland found some evidence for ancient burials in 2013. The excavations, conducted in the area of Martyrs Bay, revealed burials from the 6th–8th centuries, probably jumbled up and reburied in the 13–15th centuries.

Other early Christian and medieval monuments have been removed for preservation to the cloister arcade of the Abbey, and the Abbey museum (in the medieval infirmary). The ancient buildings of Iona Abbey are now cared for by Historic Environment Scotland (there is an entrance charge to visit them).

== Marble quarry remains ==
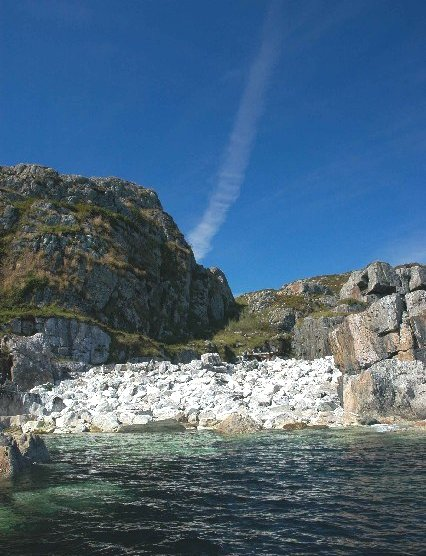
Iona Marble Quarry

The remains of a marble quarrying enterprise are present in a small bay on the south-east shore of Iona. The quarry is the source of "Iona Marble", a translucent green and white stone, much used in brooches and other jewellery. The stone has been known of for centuries and was credited with healing and other powers. While the quarry had been used in a small way, it was not until around the end of the 18th century when it was opened up on a more industrial scale by the Duke of Argyle. The difficulties of extracting the hard stone and transporting it meant that the scheme was short lived. Another attempt was started in 1907, this time more successful with considerable quantities of stone extracted and indeed exported. The First World War impacted the quarry, with little quarrying after 1914 and the operation finally closed in 1919. A painting showing the quarry in operation, The Marble Quarry, Iona (1909) by David Young Cameron, is in the collection of Cartwright Hall art gallery in Bradford. The site has been designated as a Scheduled Ancient Monument.

== Present day ==
The island, other than the land owned by the Iona Cathedral Trust, was purchased from the Duke of Argyll by Hugh Fraser in 1979 and donated to the National Trust for Scotland. In 2001 Iona's population was 125 and by the time of the 2011 census this had grown to 177 usual residents. During the same period Scottish island populations as a whole grew by 4% to 103,702. The resident population in 2022 was stable at 178.

The island's tourism bureau estimated that roughly 130,000 visitors arrived each year. Many tourists come to visit the Abbey and other ecclesiastical properties and the marble quarry or to enjoy the nine beaches that are within walking distance of the main area.

=== Iona Community ===
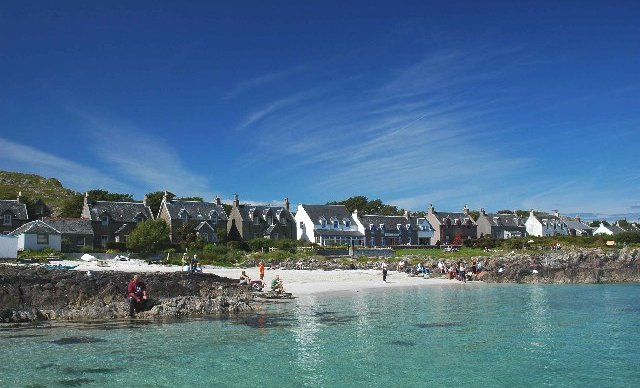
Baile Mòr viewed from the Sound of Iona

Not to be confused with the local island community, Iona (Abbey) Community is based within Iona Abbey.

In 1938 George MacLeod founded the Iona Community, an ecumenical Christian community of men and women from different walks of life and different traditions in the Christian church committed to seeking new ways of living the Gospel of Jesus in today's world. This community is a leading force in the present Celtic Christian revival.

The Iona Community runs three residential centres on the Isle of Iona and on Mull, where one can live together in community with people of every background from all over the world. Weeks at the centres often follow a programme related to the concerns of the Iona Community.

The 8 tonne Fallen Christ sculpture by Ronald Rae was permanently situated outside the MacLeod Centre in February 2008.

=== Transport ===
Visitors can reach Iona by the 10 minute ferry trip across the Sound of Iona from Fionnphort on Mull. The most common route from the mainland is via Oban in Argyll and Bute, where regular ferries connect to Craignure on Mull, from where the scenic road runs 37 miles (60 kilometres) to Fionnphort. Tourist coaches and local bus services meet the ferries.

Car ownership is lightly regulated, with no requirement for a MOT Certificate or payment of Road Tax for cars kept permanently on the island, but vehicular access is restricted to permanent residents and there are few cars. Visitors are not allowed to bring vehicles onto the island although "blue badge holders with restricted mobility ... may apply for a permit under certain exemptions". Visitors will find the village, the shops, the post office, the cafe, the hotels and the abbey are all within walking distance. Bike hire is available at the pier, and on Mull. Taxi service is also available.

Preceding station	Caledonian MacBrayne	Following station
Terminus	Iona ferry	Fionnphort Terminus

=== Tourism ===
Conde Nast Traveller recommends the island for its "peaceful atmosphere ... a popular place for spiritual retreats" but also recommends the "sandy beaches, cliffs, rocks, fields and bogs ... "wildflowers and birds such as the rare corncrake and puffins" as well as the "abundance of sea life".

The Iona Council advises visitors that they can find a campsite (at Cnoc Oran), a hostel (at Lagandorain), family run bed and breakfasts and two hotels on the island in addition to several self-catering houses. The agency also mentions that distances are short, with the Abbey a mere 10 minutes walk from the pier. Tourists can rent bikes or use the local taxi.

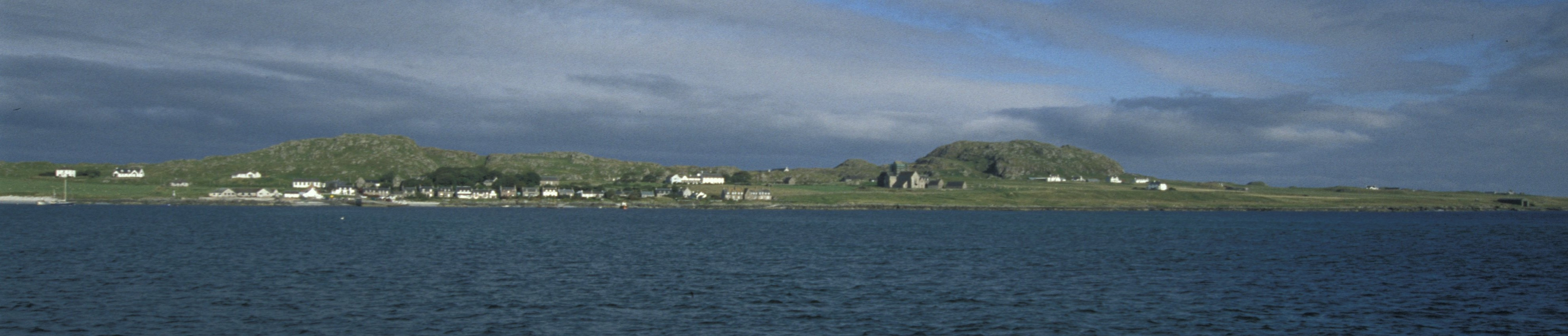
Iona from Mull. The Abbey lies below Dun Ì at right and the main settlement of Baile Mòr is to the left.

== Iona in Scottish painting ==
The island of Iona has played an important role in Scottish landscape painting, especially during the 20th century. As travel to north and west Scotland became easier from the mid-18th century onwards, artists' visits to the island steadily increased. The Abbey remains in particular became frequently recorded during this early period. Many of the artists are listed and illustrated in the valuable book, "Iona Portrayed – The Island through Artists' Eyes 1760–1960", which lists over 170 artists known to have painted on the island.

The 20th century, however, saw the greatest period of influence on landscape painting, in particular through the many paintings of the island produced by F. C. B. Cadell and S. J. Peploe, two of the "Scottish Colourists". As with many artists, both professional and amateur, they were attracted by the unique quality of light, the white sandy beaches, the aquamarine colours of the sea and the landscape of rich greens and rocky outcrops. While Cadell and Peploe are perhaps best known, many major Scottish painters of the C20 worked on Iona and visited many times – for example George Houston, D. Y. Cameron, James Shearer, John Duncan and John Maclauchlan Milne, among many.

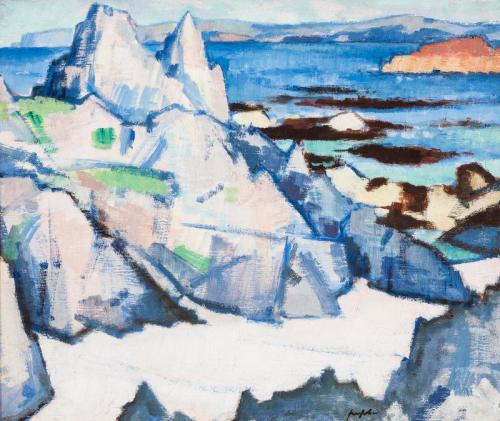
Cathedral Rock, Iona, Samuel Peploe (1920), Aberdeen Art Gallery

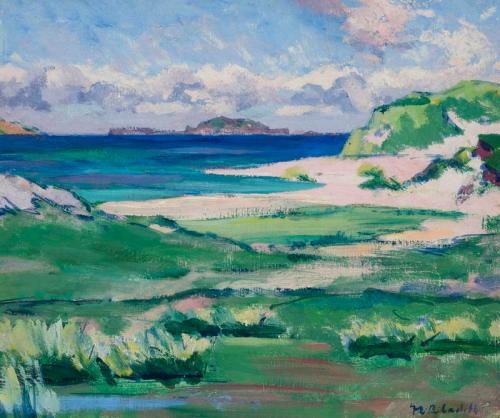
Lunga from Iona, Francis Cadell, Aberdeen Art Gallery

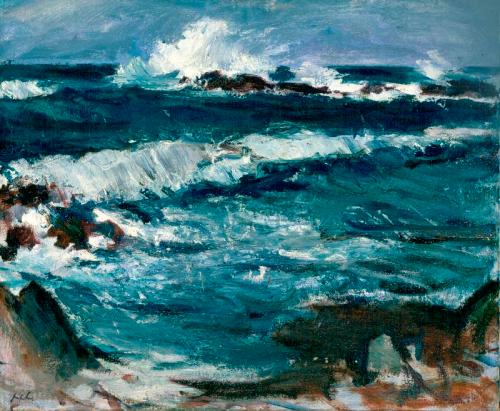
Stormy Weather, Iona, Samuel Peploe (ca.1929), Aberdeen Art Gallery

== Media and the arts ==
Samuel Johnson wrote "That man is little to be envied whose patriotism would not gain force upon the plains of Marathon or whose piety would not grow warmer amid the ruins of Iona."

In Jules Verne's novel The Green Ray, the heroes visit Iona in chapters 13 to 16. The inspiration is romantic, the ruins of the island are conducive to daydreaming. The young heroine, Helena Campbell, argues that Scotland in general and Iona in particular are the scene of the appearance of goblins and other familiar demons.

In Jean Raspail's novel The Fisherman's Ring (1995), his cardinal is one of the last to support the antipope Benedict XIII and his successors.

In the novel The Carved Stone (by Guillaume Prévost), the young Samuel Faulkner is projected in time as he searches for his father and lands on Iona in the year 800, then threatened by the Vikings.

"Peace of Iona" is a song written by Mike Scott that appears on the studio album Universal Hall and on the live recording Karma to Burn by The Waterboys. Iona is the setting for the song "Oran" on the 1997 Steve McDonald album Stone of Destiny.

Iona is featured prominently in the first episode ("By the Skin of Our Teeth") of the celebrated arts series Civilisation: A Personal View by Kenneth Clark (1969).

The Academy Award–nominated Irish animated film The Secret of Kells is about the creation of the Book of Kells. One of the characters, Brother Aidan, is a master illuminator from Iona Abbey who had helped to illustrate the Book, but had to escape the island with it during a Viking invasion.

Neil Gaiman's poem "In Relig Odhrain", published in Trigger Warning: Short Fictions and Disturbances (2015), retells the story of Oran's death, and the creation of the chapel on Iona. This poem was made into a short stop-motion animated film, released in 2019.

The island is the setting for David Greig's novel ‘’The Book of I,’’ 2025, Europa Editions. The novel takes place in 825.

St Columba's Return is a painting by Mull-based artist, David Page. It depicts St Columba approaching Iona in his currach, sailing beneath a 340 metres (1,120 ft) wind turbine. The artist describes the work as "symbolic", drawing attention to "what would be lost" if Iberdrola was given permission to develop its proposed MachairWind off-shore wind farm 13 miles (21 km) off the Iona coast. In October 2026, Iona residents offered the work on loan to the Guggenheim Museum Bilbao, with the aim of "sending a message" to Iberdrola, the principle sponsor of the museum.

== Gallery ==
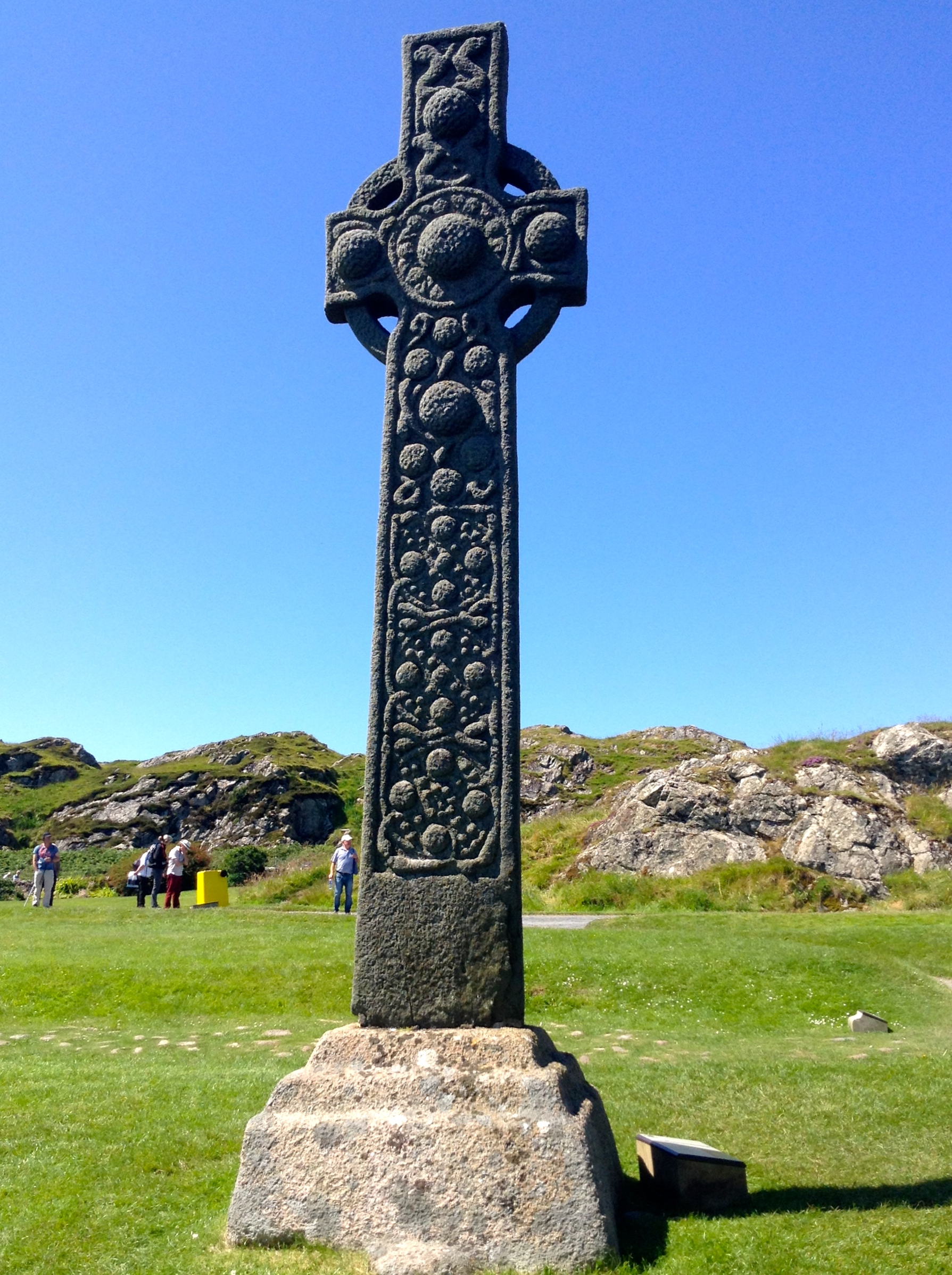
St Martin's Cross (from the 9th century)

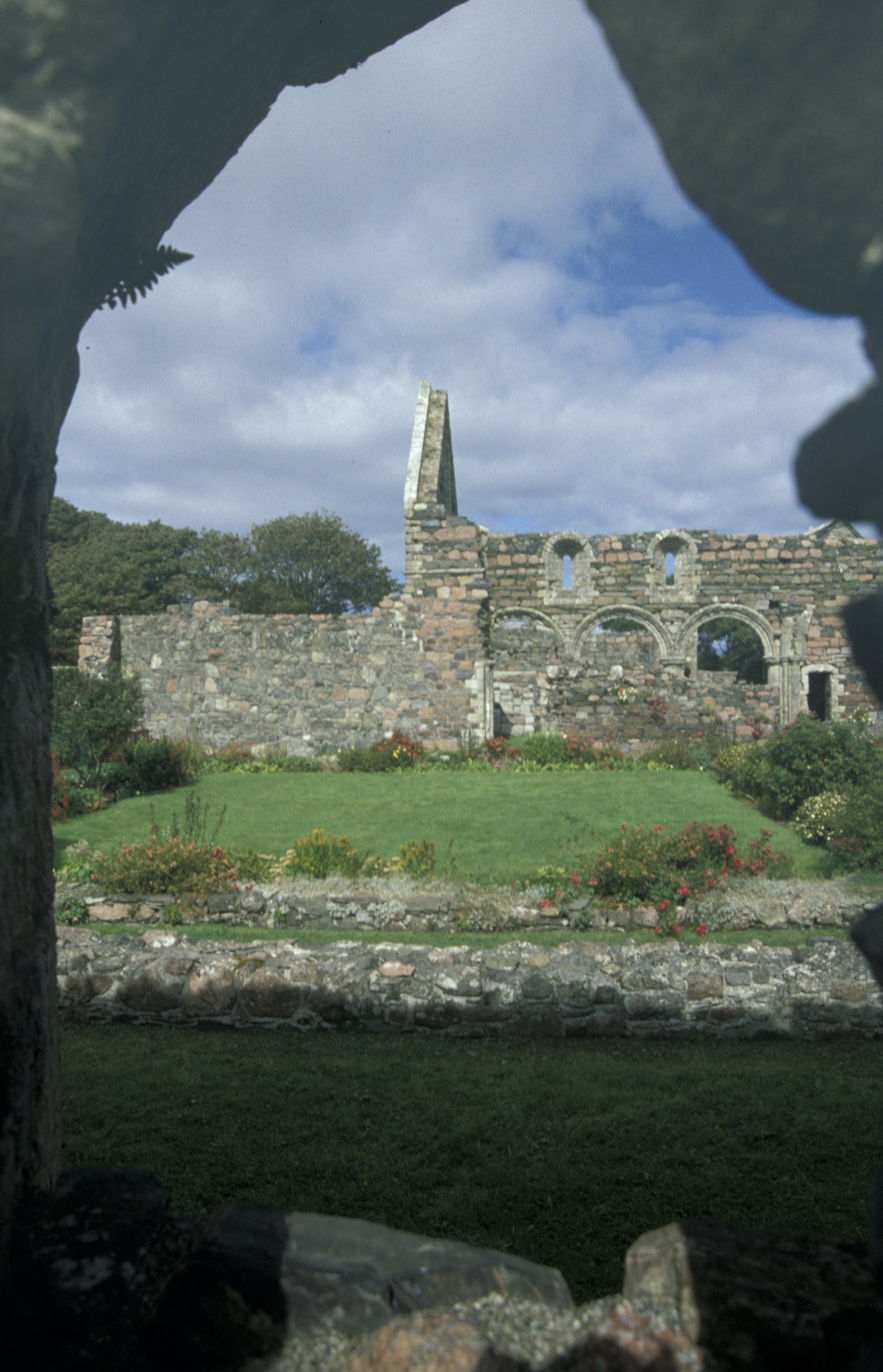
Iona Nunnery

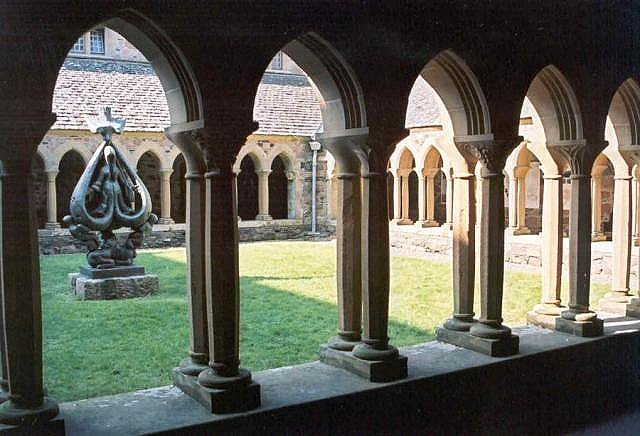
Abbey cloisters

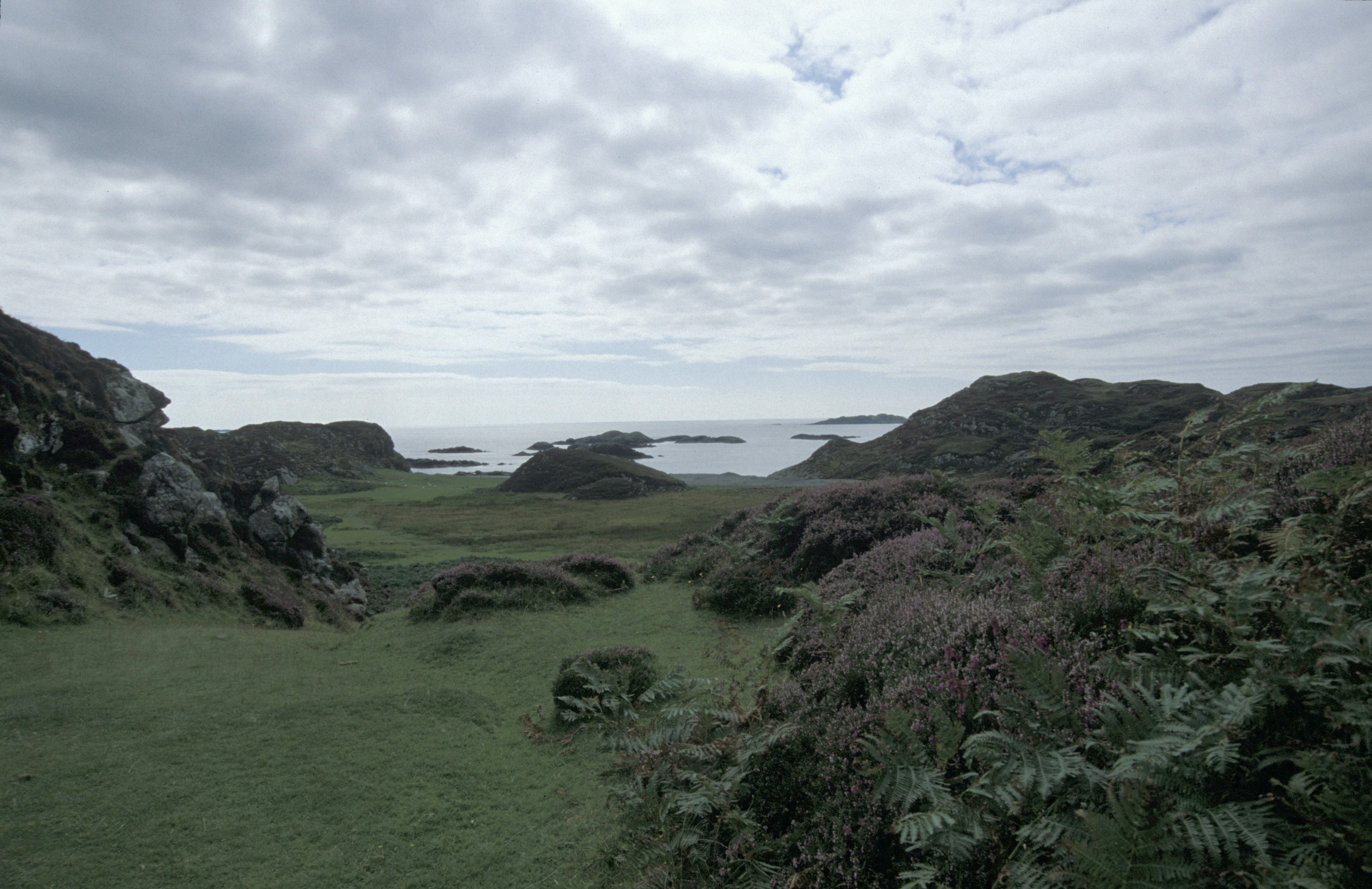
Looking towards St Columba's Bay

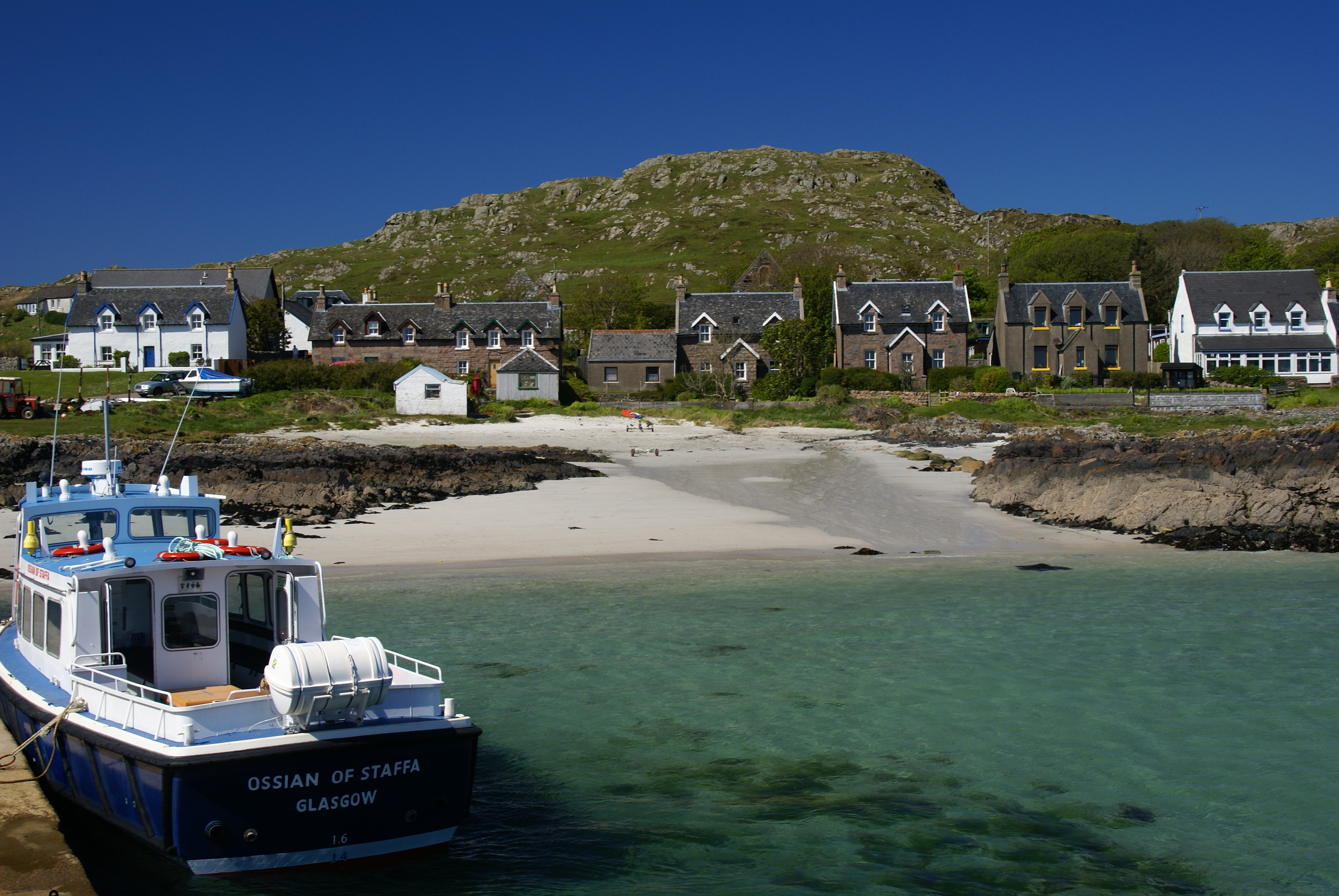
Jetty at Baile Mòr

== See also ==
- List of islands of Scotland
- Isle of Mull
- Bishop's House, Iona
- Clann-an-oistir
- Dál Riata
- Statutes of Iona
