= Bay at the Back of the Ocean =

Bay on Iona, Argyll and Bute, Scotland

Coordinates: 56.3261°N 6.432°W

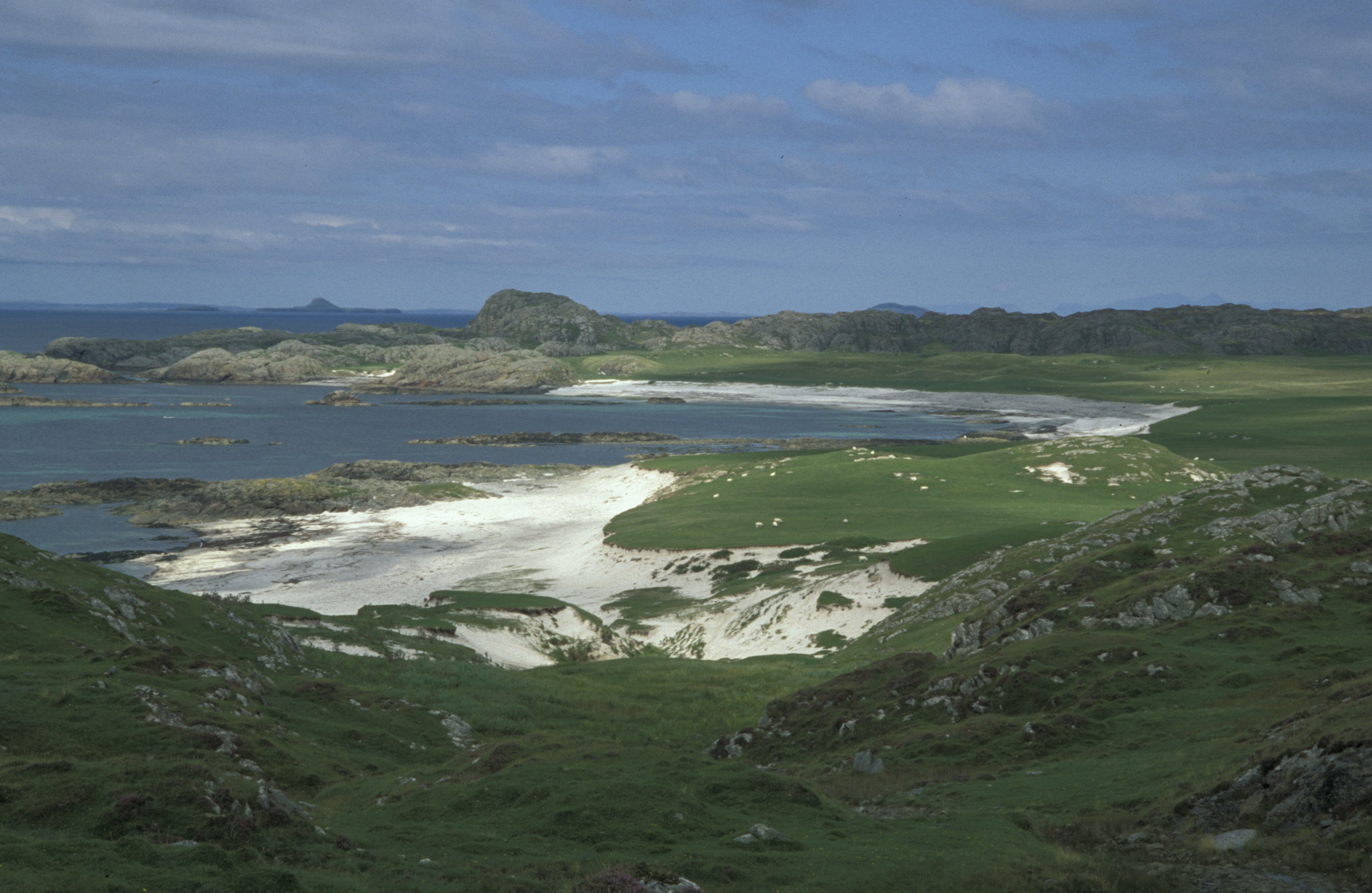
Bay at the Back of the Ocean, Iona (2003-08-25)

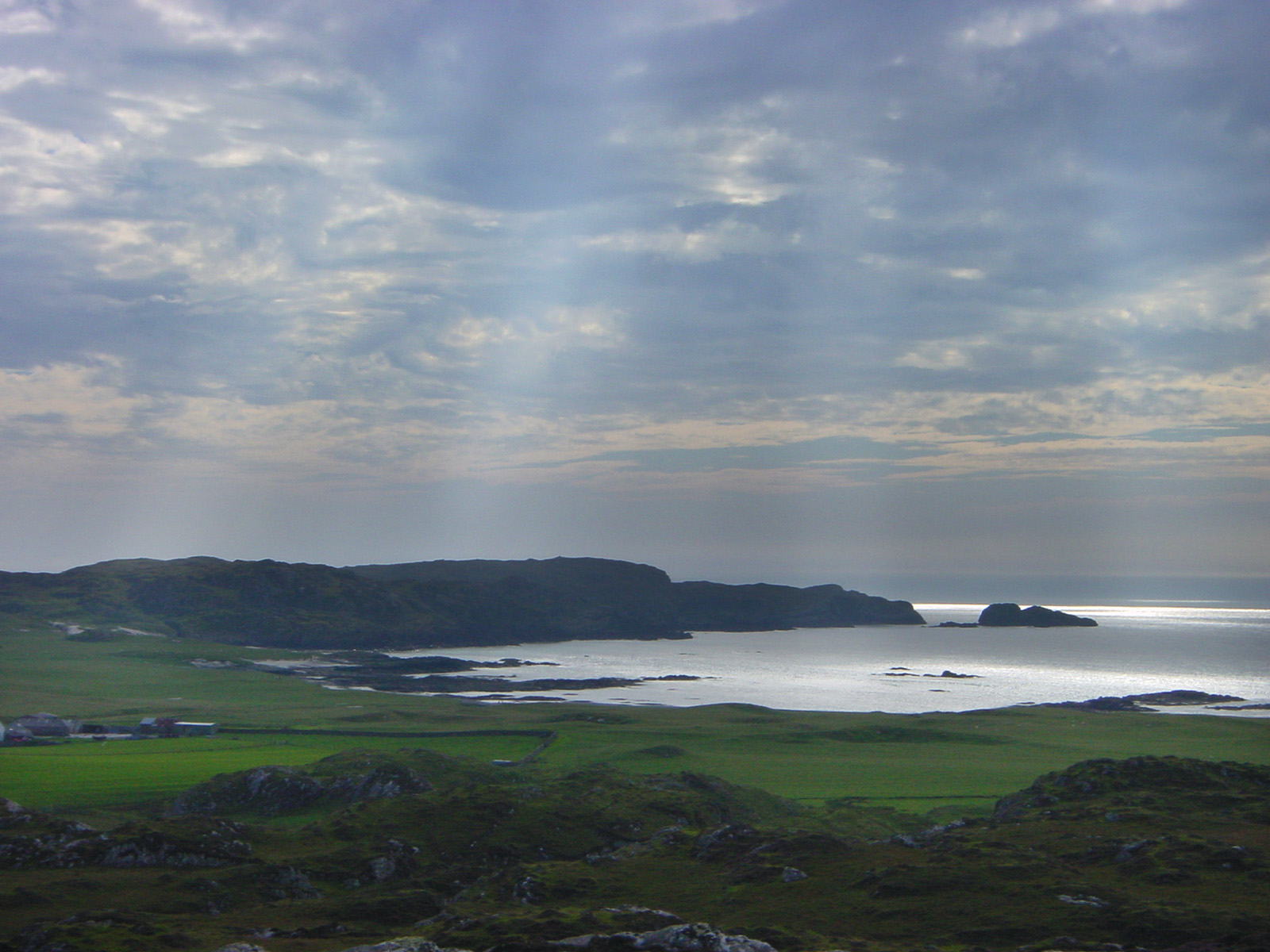
Camas Cuil an t-Saimh, Iona (2005-09-06)

The Bay at the Back of the Ocean (Scottish Gaelic: Camas Cuil an t-Saimh) is a wide, west facing bay on the island of Iona, Argyll and Bute, Scotland, and is so named because the next westward stop is North America.

Behind the beach is the machair, a wide grassed area that houses communal sheep grazing for the island, and the local golf course. It is the half-way point of the most popular walk on the island.
