= Ólchobar mac Duib-Indrecht =

Ólchobar mac Duib-Indrecht (died 805) was a supposed King of Munster from the Eóganacht Áine branch of the Eóganachta. His last paternal ancestor to hold the throne was Cúán mac Amalgado (died 641), five generations previous. His great-grandfather Uisnech had been the brother of another King Eterscél mac Máele Umai (died 721). According to a genealogical tract Uisneach was heir apparent to the Munster throne until slain by his brother through envy and hatred and then Eterscél assumed the kingship of Munster.

For the seventh and most of the eighth century, the Kingship of Munster had rotated among the inner circle of Eóganachta. This was broken by the reign of Máel Dúin mac Áedo (died 786) of the Eóganacht Locha Léin branch which ruled in Iarmuman (West Munster). The definitive restoration of the rule of the inner circle is considered to be the ordination of Artrí mac Cathail (died 821) of the Eóganacht Glendamnach branch as king in 793. Ólchobar may have been recognized as heir and is called the royal heir of Mumu at his death by the Annals of Innisfallen. An alternative is that he succeeded Máel Dúin in 786 and was deposed in 793.

Ólchobar mac Flainn (died 796), a supposed King of Munster from the Uí Fidgenti of County Limerick may have been confused with Ólchobar mac Duib-Indrecht.
