= Artrí mac Cathail =

King of Munster (r. 793–820)

Artrí mac Cathail (died 821) was a King of Munster from the Glendamnach branch of the Eóganachta. He was the son of Cathal mac Finguine (died 742), a previous king. He reigned from 793 to 820.

The kingship of Munster had rotated among the inner circle of Eóganachta during the seventh and most of the eighth centuries. But the Eóganachta experienced a decline after the death of Cathal mac Finguine in 742. The rotation was interrupted by the rule of Máel Dúin mac Áedo (died 786) of the Eóganacht Locha Léin branch which ruled in Iarmumu (West Munster). The definitive restoration of the rule of the inner circle is considered to be the ordination of Artrí as king in 793. Simultaneously with his ordination, the Law of Ailbe, patron saint of Emly was proclaimed in Munster. In 794, an expedition by the high king Donnchad Midi (died 797) is recorded to aid the Laigin against a Munster incursion, but Artrí is not directly connected with this.

Artrí may have recognized Ólchobar mac Duib-Indrecht (died 805) of the Áine branch as heir, who is recognized as such in his death obit in the Annals of Innisfallen. An alternative is that Ólchobar succeeded Máel Dúin in 786 and was deposed in 793 by Artrí. Artrí may have had his son Tnúthgal mac Artrach ordained as King as well who died circa 807.

The accession of Feidlimid mac Cremthanin (died 847) of the Cashel branch is recorded in 820 with the death of Artrí the next year in 821. It is possible that the aged Artrí abdicated the throne. Artrí was the last King of Munster from the Glendamnach line. His great grandson Art Caemh was ancestor of the Ó Caiomh (O'Keeffes) of County Cork.
