= Ólchobar =

Ólchobar is an Irish male name, most common among Medieval kings of Munster of the Eóganachta. It might refer to:

- Ólchobar mac Flainn (died 796), supposed king of Munster
- Ólchobar mac Duib-Indrecht (died 805), supposed king of Munster
- Ólchobar mac Cináeda (died 851), confirmed king of Munster
