= Cenn Fáelad hua Mugthigirn =

King of Munster
- Reign: 859(?)–872
- Predecessor: Máel Gualae mac Donngaile
- Successor: Dúnchad mac Duib-dá-Bairenn
- Died: 872
- Spouse: Unknown
- Issue: Eógan mac Cinn Fáclad
- House: Eoganachta
- Father: Mugthigirn
- Mother: Unknown

Cenn Fáelad hua Mugthigirn (died 872) was a King of Munster of the Eoganachta, the ruling dynasty of Munster. He ruled from 861 to 872. He was also abbot of Emly from 851 to 872, an important monastery in County Tipperary where he succeeded a previous King of Munster, Ólchobar mac Cináeda (died 851).

He was originally considered a member of the Eóganacht Airthir Cliach as a 5th generation descendant of Cormac Sriabderg, brother of Fergus Scandal mac Crimthainn (died 582), King of Munster. Recent research has shown this pedigree to be faulty and it is more likely he was of the Eóganacht Áine branch and a 6th generation descendant of Garbán mac Éndai (flourished 596), King of Munster. The Laud Synchronisms also refer to him as from this branch. This branch of the family was centered at Cnoc Áine (Knockaney, County Limerick) in the region of Cliú (eastern Limerick) not far from Emly. His uncle Rechtibrae mac Mugthigirn (died 819) was abbot of Emly from 787-819 and his grandfather Mugthigern mac Cellaig (d.785) was abbot of Innis Celtra (Holy Island in Loch Derg). His father's name may have been Murchad.

Cenn Fáelad acquired the throne in 861 after a two-year interregnum. The high king, Máel Sechnaill mac Máele Ruanaid (died 862) of Clann Cholmáin had reduced Munster to complete submission in 858 and detached Osraige from Munster in 859. The King of Munster, Máel Gualae mac Donngaile (died 859), was then captured by the Norse and stoned to death. In 860, the men of Munster accompanied the forces of the high king in his expedition to the north against the Northern Ui Neill.

The Norse Vikings in Munster remained active in this period. In 866, Vikings from Limerick led by Tomrar plundered Clonfert but were then defeated and Tomrar went mad and died on the Isle of Man. The Ciarraige tribe then attacked his followers and with the aid of the sea they were victorious. Also, in 866, The Norse of Cork, led by a man named Gním Cinnsiolaigh, led an attack on the Fir Maige Fén, a tribe centered at (Fermoy, County Cork). The Déisi, however, joined forces with the attacked and defeated the Norse leader who fled to a fort for refuge. The Norse leader appealed to Cenn Fáelad for protection but he refused it and the Norse leader was dragged from his refuge and killed. In 871, an attack on Munster by the powerful Osraige king Cerball mac Dunlainge is recorded as far as West Munster across the Sliabh Luachra.

The death of Cenn Fáelad is recorded in 872 after prolonged suffering. His son Eógan mac Cinn Fáelad (died 890) was abbot of Emly from 887-890.
