= Cathal mac Finguine =

Ruler of Ireland

Cathal mac Finguine (died 742) was an Irish King of Munster or Cashel, and effectively High King of Ireland as well. He belonged to the Eóganacht Glendamnach sept of the dominant Eóganachta kin-group whose members dominated Munster from the 7th century to the 10th. His father, uncle, grandfather and great-grandfather had also been kings of Cashel, as were his son and grandson.

Cathal's conflict with the Uí Néill kings, Fergal mac Máele Dúin, Flaithbertach mac Loingsig, and Áed Allán, son of Fergal mac Máele Dúin, is reported at some length in the Irish annals, and again northern and southern versions provide differing accounts. Cathal also appears as a character, not always portrayed sympathetically as in Aislinge Meic Con Glinne where he is possessed by a demon of gluttony, in a number of prose and verse tales in the Middle Irish language.

Widely regarded as the most powerful Irish king of the first half of the 8th century, and the strongest (historical) king from Munster before Brian Bóruma, Cathal mac Finguine is believed to be the last king mentioned in the Baile Chuinn Chétchathaig. The most expansionist historical Eóganacht king before him was Faílbe Flann mac Áedo Duib (d. 639).

== Background ==
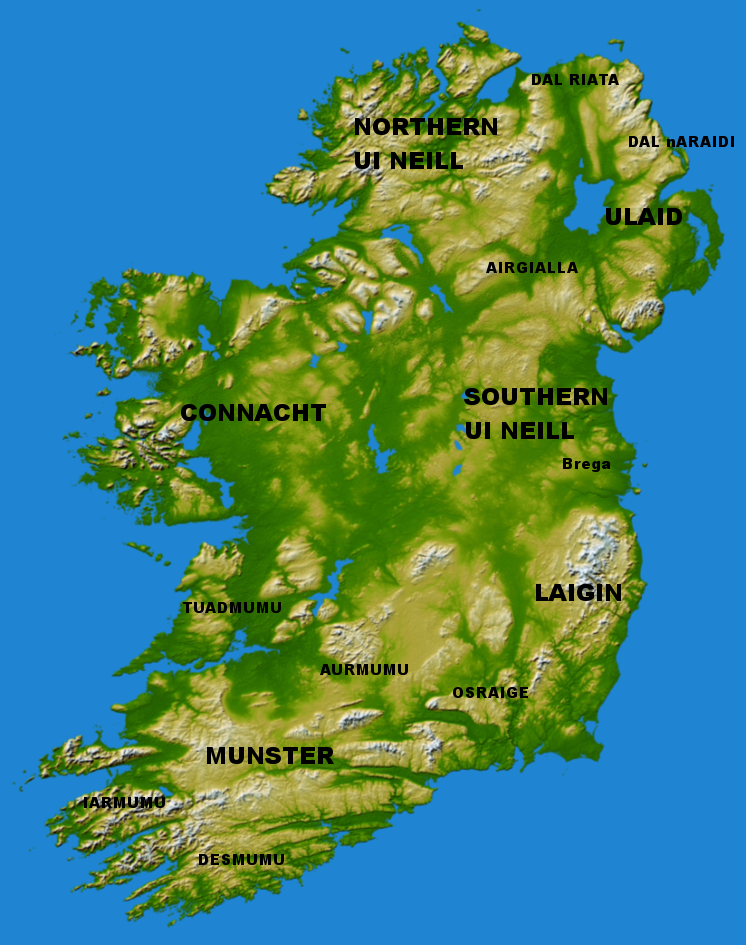
Map showing the major kingdoms and regions of early Christian Ireland.

The Eóganachta kingship, which had its chief seat at Cashel and chief church at Emly, was the most powerful in the southern half of Ireland, while the various branches of the Uí Néill and Connachta dominated the northern half. At this time, the Uí Néill were striving to be the sole Kings of Tara, with the succession generally alternating between the northern and southern branches of the Uí Néill, although the ancient ceremonial kingship had not long before been held by the Laigin and Ulaid, and more distantly the Dáirine and Érainn. The kingship of Cashel, argued in early Munster sources, e.g., the Uraicecht Becc, as actually the most powerful in Ireland, was founded in the middle of the 5th century by the descendants of Conall Corc and Aimend, the "inner circle" of the Eóganachta, who after a century and a half of able politicking had come to supersede the overlordship of the Corcu Loígde in Munster.

For the century and a quarter until Cathal's death, the kingship of Cashel was dominated by the Eóganacht Chaisil and Eóganacht Glendamnach septs of the inner circle. The lands of the Glendamnach lay to the south-west of Cashel, in the middle valley of the Blackwater. Cathal's father, Finguine mac Cathail Con-cen-máthair (d. 696), uncle, Ailill mac Cathail (d. 701), grandfather, Cathal Cú-cen-máthair (d. 665/666), and great-grandfather, Cathal mac Áedo (d. 628), had been kings of Cashel.

Cathal's immediate predecessor was probably Cormac mac Ailello of the Caisil sept, who was killed in battle against the Déisi in 713. Eterscél mac Máele Umai, who had been king and did not die until 721, had probably abdicated much earlier so that Cathal was king at Cashel from around 713 onwards.

While the Uí Néill and Eóganachta were the most important kingships in Ireland, the kings of Leinster and the kings of Connacht were significant forces. Leinster, once a much larger region, the northern parts of which had been conquered by the Uí Néill, was the target of expansionist Uí Néill kings, and also of the Eóganachta. The contest for control of Leinster would play a major part in Cathal's reign, and indeed in relations between the Eóganachta and Uí Néill in the centuries which followed. The kings of Connacht claimed a common kinship with the Uí Néill, and were largely favourable towards them. The remaining provincial kingship, that of the kings of Ulster, controlled a much smaller area than the later province of Ulster, largely confined to the lands north and east of Lough Neagh, and was generally hostile to the Uí Néill. Finally, in the vast province of Munster itself there were several respectable but peripheral dynasties, such as the Uí Liatháin (for whom see below), whose relationships with the Eóganachta were rather distant and ambiguous.

== Early reign ==
The earliest record concerning Cathal, although it does not explicitly name him, is in 715 when Murchad mac Brain Mut of the Uí Dúnlainge, the king of Leinster, led his inaugural raid against Cashel. The first event to mention Cathal is in 721 when he and Murchad mac Brain attacked the lands of the southern Uí Néill. The Annals of Ulster report: "[t]he wasting of Mag Breg by Cathal son of Finnguine, and by Murchad son of Bran." Later that year, Fergal mac Máele Dúin retaliated, not against Cathal and Munster, but against Murchad and Leinster. The Annals of Ulster report: "An invasion of the Laigin by Fergal, and the cattle tribute was imposed and the hostages of the Laigin secured for Fergal son of Mael Dúin." That Fergal attacked Leinster in retaliation for the raid on Brega may mean that Cathal was, as Irwin notes, "the junior partner".

The Annals of Inisfallen, as partisan a southern record as the Annals of Ulster are biased towards the Uí Néill, give a different and less reliable report of the events in 721:

The harrying of Brega by Cathal son of Finnguine, king of Mumu, and after that he and Ferga son of Mael Dúin, king of Temuir [Tara], made peace; and Ferga submitted to Cathal. For these were the five kings of the Munstermen who ruled Ireland after the [introduction of the] Faith, viz. Aengus son of Nad Fraích, and his son, i.e. Eochaid who ruled Ireland for seventeen years, and Cathal, son of Finnguine, and Feidlimid, son of Crimthann, and Brian, son of Cennétig.

Fergal led an Uí Néill army south into Leinster again in 722, but this time he was defeated and killed by the Leinstermen. This defeat was recorded in the Cath Almaine, a poem about the battle of Allen, fought on 11 December 722, the feast of Saint Finnian of Clonard. Much of the work is devoted to the story of the faithful bard Donn Bó, but the introduction provides a late view of the war:

For a long time there was great warfare between Cathal son of Findguine, king of Leth Mogha, and Fergal son of Máel Duin, king of Leth Cuinn. Fergal son of Mael Duin raided Leinster in order to injure Cathal son of Findguine; so Cathal son of Findguine wasted the whole of Magh Bregh [the plain of Brega], until they made peace and truce.

This truce, the poet tells, was broken by the Leinstermen:

The Leinstermen had delivered this battle of Allen in the absence of Cathal mac Finguini, and Cathal was grieved that the battle was fought while he himself was away. They heard of Cathal's grudge against them, so this was the counsel they framed, to carry to Cathal Fergal's head as a trophy of the action.

== Cathal and Flaithbertach mac Loingsig ==
On the death of Fergal, the Uí Néill kingship of Tara passed to Fogartach mac Néill of the Síl nÁedo Sláine of South Brega, whose nominal High Kingship was ended in 724 when he was killed fighting against his Síl nÁedo Sláine kinsman Cináed mac Írgalaid of North Brega, who became the new overking of the Uí Néill. Cináed retained the overlordship of the Uí Néill for less than four years, being killed in battle at Druim Corcain against the Cenél Conaill king Flaithbertach mac Loingsig, who took the overlordship of the Uí Néill. Flaithbertach himself reigned for only a few years before Áed Allán of the Cenél nEógain, son of Fergal mac Máele Dúin, fought him for the leadership of the Uí Néill, beginning in 732 and continuing through several battles until Flaithbertach abdicated and entered a monastery in 734.

With the Uí Néill kings no great threat during the reigns of Fogartach, Cináed and Flaithbertach, Cathal sought to extend his authority over Leinster. The Cath Almaine claims that the dispute arose because Fergal mac Máele Dúin had been killed in defiance of the truce he had made with Cathal.

Cathal was defeated by Áed mac Colggen of the Uí Cheinnselaig, then King of Leinster, in 731, and the second battle in 735 was an even greater defeat:

A battle between Mumu and Laigin, in which many of the Laigin and well nigh countless Munstermen perished; Cellach son of Faelchar, king of Osraige, fell therein, but Cathal son of Finnguine, king of Mumu, escaped.

In 733 Cathal raided the lands of the Southern Uí Néill, but was defeated and driven off from Tailtiu by Domnall Midi of Clann Cholmáin. Cathal had more success against the neighbouring Clann Cholmáin Bicc, ruled by Fallomon mac Con Congalt, whom he defeated at the Hill of Ward. In 734 Cathal inflicted a defeat on the Leinstermen at Bealach Ele.

== Cathal and Áed Allán ==
In 737, Áed Allán met with Cathal at Terryglass, probably neutral ground outwith the control of either king. Byrne says that it is unlikely that Cathal acknowledged Áed Allán's authority—the Uí Néill had little enough influence in the south—but if Cathal had expected some benefit from the meeting, where he perhaps acknowledged the ecclesiastical supremacy of Armagh, he was to be disappointed. However, the clerics of Armagh may have been well satisfied as the Annals of Ulster, in the entry following that which reports the meeting of Cathal and Áed Allán, say that the law of Patrick was in force in Ireland. This presumably means that they agreed to the special treatment of the church, its lands and its tenants, as prescribed by the law of Patrick.

== Mór Muman ==
Of Mór Muman a legend survives which compares her to the goddess of sovereignty. Mór was placed under an enchantment and lost her senses. She wandered Ireland for two years before she came to Cashel and the court of Fingen. Fingen eventually slept with her, and her memory returned. In the morning, Fingen gave her the Queen's robe and brooch, and put aside his current Queen, daughter of the king of the Deisi, and put Mór in her place as she was of better blood. The Metrical Dindshenchas say of Fingen mac Áedo and Mór:

Best of the women of Inis Fail
is Mór daughter of Áed Bennan.
Better is Fingen than any hero
that drives about Femen.

When Fingen died, the story says, Mór Muman married Cathal mac Finguine. Unfortunately, the collector of this tale mistook this Cathal for his great-grandfather, Cathal mac Áedo Flaind. He may have married Mór Muman, but Cathal mac Finguine certainly did not.

== Depiction in The Vision of Mac Conglinne ==
Cathal Mac Finguine is a major character portrayed in the medieval satire Aislinge Meic Con Glinne as ruler of the Kingdom of Munster. The satire is a commentary on the religious politics of 8th century Ireland.

Cathal is vying for the Kingship of Tara against the Kings of Ailech and in an effort to cement cordial relations he attempts courting Lígach, the daughter of Máel Dúin mac Máele Fithrich.

This battle for supremacy between Leath Cuinn and Leath Moga is expressed through the dialogue of a crone from each realm:

"He comes from the North, comes from the North,
The son of Máeldúin, over the rocks,
Over Barrow's brink, over Barrow's brink
The kine he take he will not stay.
He shall stay, shall stay,
said the southern hag;
He will be thankful if he escapes.
By my father's hand, by my father's hand,
If Cathal meets him, he'll take no kine"

Cathal's love letters are intercepted by Lígach's brother Fergal mac Máele Dúin. Fergal asks a scholar to place charms and heathen spells on the apples being sent by his sister to King Cathal, with the aim of bringing about his destruction.

Cathal eats the apples and a demon of gluttony enters his stomach. His gluttonous actions are so terrible that a famine is caused and the people of Munster are brought low:

"Cathal thereupon ate the apples, and little creatures through the poison spells were formed of them in his inside. And those little creatures gathered in the womb of one - in that animal, so that there was formed the demon of gluttony. And this is the cause why the demon of gluttony abode in the throat of Cathal MacFinguine, to the ruin of the men of Munster during three half-years; and it is likely he would have ruined Ireland during another half-year."

Munster's weakness is seen as an opportunity by political and religious leaders in the North to bring the South more firmly under their authority. The Kingdom of Ulster had since the time of Saint Patrick been the power centre of the Roman Catholic Archdiocese of Armagh. Conspirators gathered in Armagh and hatched a plot to undermine the Munster Church and win over King Cathal to the Patrician cause:

"I heard of eight to-night
In Armagh after midnight,
I proclaim them with hosts of deeds.
Their names are no sweet symphonies,

Comgán was the name of the Two Smiths' son
Famous was he after the hunt.
Critán was Rustang's noble son
It was a full fitting name.

The Two Tribes' Dark One, a shining cry
That was the name of Stelene's son.
Dun Raven, a white nun, of Beare
Rough Derry was the name of Samán's son.

Never-Refused was MacConglinne's name
From the brink of the sweet-crested Bann
Wee Man Wee Wife, bag of carnage
Were Dead Man's sire and dam.

My king, king of high heaven
That givest hosts victory over death
Great son of Mary,—Thine the way
A confluence of cries I heard."

MacConglinne is elected to travel to Munster from Armagh and visits the monastery of Finbar of Cork where a dispute soon arises. Mac Conglinne accuses the monastery of meagre hospitality and 'oaten rations'. Under Early Irish law adequate bed and board was expected as a minimum standard of customary hospitality. The Cork monastery may have been suffering from the famine Munster had been experiencing or may well have been aligned to the more ascetic form of Celtic Christianity which was less prominent in the North of Ireland than it was in the South at that time.

Mac Conglinne is imprisoned by the monks for a slanderous áer he composes about the land of Cork. Mac Conglinne eventually manages to bargain his way to freedom when he claims he can cure King Cathal of his gluttonous possession that has brought Munster to its knees. Cathal is cured and promises Mac Conglinne:

‘He shall have a cow out of every close in Munster,
An ounce for every householder,
A cloak for every church,
And a sheep from every house from Carn to Cork.'

Mac Conglinne demands that he be invested by King Cathal with the cloak of the abbot of the monastery of Finbar of Cork if he restores the King to health. King Cathals reward for Mac Conglinne's cure is recorded by a poet resident in the Cathal's court named Roennu Resamnach who then made these quatrains:

"Manchín set out a clear task
Mac Conglinne to accuse,
It was Manchín who was duped
Out of his hooded cloaklet.
Twere not too much for Mac Conglinne,
though not one of our people.
The renowned cloak that I see is worth thrice seven cumal
though twere of the ravens hue
from Cathal, King of Munster.
Also, not too much for me
Though gold was in its border
It was given by his will
And spoken in pure reason
For health of reason—

King Cathal now Receives the cloak from Manchín."

The poem depicts King Cathal rewarding Mac Conglinne with the ecclesiastical Investiture of Munchins cloak. Munchin was very displeased to hear that, the symbol of his office, was being given up as a reward to Mac Conglinne and stated:

"I declare, in the presence of God and of St. Barra,
that if the whole country between Cork and its boundary were mine,
I would sooner resign it all than the cloak alone."

‘Woe to him that gives not the cloak, cried all present, ‘for the salvation of Cathal and Mog's Half is better than the cloak.’

== Family and descendants ==
The historical wife of Cathal was the celebrated Caillech, a princess of the Uí Liatháin, southern neighbours of Eóganacht Glendamnach. His mother, Gormgel, also appears to have been of the Uí Liatháin, but from a different branch.

Cathal's father was Finguine mac Cathail, uncle Ailill mac Cathail, grandfather Cathal Cú-cen-máthair, and great-grandfather Cathal mac Áedo. A son was Artrí mac Cathail, and a grandson Tnúthgal mac Artrach. With the exception of the last, all are reliably mentioned as kings of Cashel in the annals.

His living direct descendants, the later ruling dynasty of Eóganacht Glendamnach, descendants of Art Caemh, a great-grandson of Artrí mac Cathail, are the Ó Caiomh (O'Keeffes) of County Cork. His daughter, Taileflaith, also has prominent 21st-century descendants.

== Notes ==
Cathal mac Finguine Eóganachta
Regnal titles
Preceded by Cormac mac Ailello	King of Munster c. 713 – 742	Succeeded by Cathussach mac Eterscélai
