= Cathussach mac Eterscélai =

Cathussach mac Eterscélai (died circa 769) was a king of Munster from the Eóganacht Áine branch of the Eóganachta. He was the son of Eterscél mac Máele Umai (died 721), a previous king. His branch of the Eóganachta was situated in the south-east of modern County Limerick at Cnoc Áine (Knockainy) near the monastery of Emly in County Tipperary.

In the seventh and eighth centuries, the kingship of Munster rotated among the inner circle of the Eóganachta dynasties. His death obit and reign are not mentioned in the Irish annals. According to the Laud Synchronisms, he succeeded Cathal mac Finguine (died 742) of the Eóganacht Glendamnach branch in 742 and reigned for 27 years. This would give a reign date of 742-769.

Cathussach is not mentioned in relation to events that would have taken place in his reign in Munster and he is only known from the king lists. In the region of Cliú (eastern Co. Limerick and parts of Co. Tipperary), the Uí Fidgenti of Limerick fought a battle in 744, in which their king Conchobar was slain. Cathussach's branch of the family bordered on Cliú, but it is not known if the battle was fought by him or by the minor tribes of this region resisting Uí Fidgenti subjugation. In the region of Thomond in County Clare, the Déisi destroyed the Corco Mruad in 744 and the Uí Fidgenti fought a battle with the Corco Mruad and the Corcu Baiscinn in 763. Local power politics here were caused by the vacuum left by the decline of the Ui Fiachrach Aidhne of Connacht.

In 747 the Battle of Carn Ailche (possibly Carnelly, County Clare) is recorded as having occurred amongst the men of Munster, in other words, a civil war. In this battle a member of the Eóganacht Locha Léin, Coirpre, son of Cú Dínaisc, was slain. This branch of the Eóganachta ruled in west Munster (Iarmumu) and were semi-independent of the Kings at Cashel. Another civil battle occurred in 757, the Battle of Cenn Fabrat (near Seefin Mountain, Co. Limerick) where Bobdgal, the superior of Mungairit (Mungret Abbey, an abbey near Limerick), was slain. The victors are not named making it difficult to determine the power struggles at this time. However, it is known that the rotation among the inner circle of the Eóganachta was broken in the next reign.
