= Dauí Iarlaithe mac Maithni =

Dauí Iarlaithe mac Maithni (flourished circa 500) was a King of Iarmuman (west Munster) from the Eóganacht Locha Léin branch of the Eoganachta, the ruling dynasty of Munster. He was the grandson of the founder of this branch of the dynasty, Coirpre Luachra mac Cuirc. He has also been considered a possible King of Munster.

A genealogical tract states that he succeeded his father Maine mac Coirpri in the stewardship of Iarmuman. However he refused to pay his dues to Cashel and war broke out between him and his cousin, Óengus mac Nad Froích (died 489), the King of Munster. Eventually Dauí Iarlaithe managed to acquire the kingship of Munster. He is however not mentioned in the king lists nor the annals which give the succession to the sons of Óengus. As King of Munster he is said to have fought with the Uaithni tribe of the Loch Derg area.

His reign begins the establishment of a semi-independent Kingdom of Iarmuman from that at Cashel. Some of his descendants such as his great-grandson Áed Bennán mac Crimthainn (died 618) may have been kings of all Munster.
