= Amalgaid mac Éndai =

Amalgaid mac Éndai (died 601) was a King of Munster from the Eóganacht Áine branch of the Eoganachta and appears as the first king from this branch.

The chronology of the Munster kings from this period is confusing. The Annals of Tigernach mention him as king in 596 along with his brother Garbán mac Éndai and he is mentioned as king in The Book of Leinster. However, the pro-Glendamnach Laud Synchronisms omit him as does the saga of Senchas Fagbála Caisil "The Story of the Finding of Cashel".

His son Cúán mac Amalgado (died 641) was also a King of Munster.

Amalgaid mac Éndai Eóganachta
Regnal titles
Preceded by Feidlimid mac Coirpri Chruimm	King of Cashel c. 596 – 601 with Garbán mac Éndai (c. 596–601)	Succeeded by Fíngen mac Áedo Duib

== See also ==
- Kings of Munster
