= Eóganacht Airthir Cliach =

Eóganacht Airthir Cliach were a branch of the Eóganachta, the ruling dynasty of Munster during the 5th-10th centuries. They took their name from Cliú, a territory in eastern Co.Limerick and parts of Tipperary. Airthir meant east and their territory was in the eastern section of this territory in Tipperary County around Tipperary town. They were descended from Óengus mac Nad Froích (died 489), the first Christian King of Munster through his son Eochaid mac Óengusa (died 522) and grandson Crimthann Dearcon mac Echado. Crimthann's mother Dearcon was a member of the Arada Cliach, a minor group in Cliú.

The Eóganacht Airthir Cliach were genealogically and geographically related to the inner circle of Eóganachta dynasties which included the Glendamnach, Chaisil and Áine but did not share in the rotation of the kingship of Munster in the 7th and much of the 8th centuries. The only confirmed king from this branch was Ferghus Scannal (died 582).
