= List of kings of Munster =

Kings of Munster
- Rí Mumhan
- Map of Munster, c. 10th century.

Details
- Style: Rí Mumhan
- First monarch: Bodb Derg
- Last monarch: Cormac Mac Carthaig
- Formed: Ancient
- Abolished: 1138 or 1194 (claimant)
- Residence: Rock of Cashel
- Appointer: Tanistry
- Pretenders: Disputed: Conor Myles John O'Brien (Ó Briain); Liam Trant MacCarthy (Mac Cárthaigh)

The kings of Munster (Irish: Rí Mumhain) ruled the Kingdom of Munster in Ireland from its establishment during the Irish Iron Age until the High Middle Ages. According to Gaelic traditional history, laid out in works such as the Book of Invasions, the earliest king of Munster was Bodb Derg of the Tuatha Dé Danann. From the Gaelic peoples, an Érainn kindred known as the Dáirine (also known as Corcu Loígde and represented today in seniority by the Ó hEidirsceoil) provided several early monarchs including Cú Roí. In a process in the Cath Maige Mucrama, the Érainn lost their ascendancy in the 2nd century AD to the Deirgtine, ancestors of the Eóganachta. Munster during this period was classified as part of Leath Moga, or the southern-half, while other parts of Ireland were ruled mostly by the Connachta.

After losing Osraige to the east, Cashel was established as the capital of Munster by the Eóganachta. This kindred ruled without interruption until the 10th century. Although the High Kingship of Ireland was dominated during this time by the Uí Néill, the Eóganachta of Munster did provide Cathal mac Finguine and Fedelmid mac Crimthainn as serious contenders. This great tribe was broken down into different septs or branches, the most successful in terms of royalty being the Eóganacht Chaisil (represented by the Ó Súilleabháin and Mac Cárthaigh), the Eóganacht Glendamnach (represented by the Ó Caoimh), and the Eóganacht Áine (represented by the Ó Ciarmhaic).

Their hold was loosened by the rise of Brian Bóruma of the Dál gCais, who established the Ó Briain as kings of Munster. As well as this, Munster had to contend with the Normans. Finally, the kingdom ended as it was split into Thomond, Desmond and Ormond. The former two came to an end during the 16th century with the birth of the Tudor Kingdom of Ireland, with former rulers joining the Peerage of Ireland. There were a number of Gaelic attempts to reassert their power in Munster, such as that of Fínghin Mac Cárthaigh and Domhnall Cam Ó Súilleabháin Bhéara, but these were not successful.

== Ancient and legendary Kings of Munster ==
- Bodb Derg, king of the Sid Mumu, and later king of the Tuatha Dé Danann, succeeding The Dagda
- Conmáel, first Milesian king based in Munster, and also High King of Ireland
- Eochaid Faebar Glas, his son and High King of Ireland, possibly based in Munster also
- Eochu Mumu, his grandson and High King of Ireland, and after whom Munster is said to be named
- Énna Airgdech, his son and High King of Ireland
- Eochu Apthach, a possibly fictitious very early High King of Ireland from the Corcu Loídge, but misplaced chronologically in any event
- Íar mac Degad, ancestor of the Érainn, or those specifically named "Descendants of Iar mac Degad"
- Eterscél Mór, his son and High King of Ireland
- Conaire Mór, his son in most sources, and one of the most celebrated High Kings of Ireland
- Conaire Cóem, High King of Ireland and great-great grandson of Conaire Mór
  - Note: both are ancestors of the Síl Conairi
- Dáire mac Degad, ancestor of the Dáirine
- Cú Roí mac Dáire, Munster king and/or deity known from the Ulster Cycle
  - Note: possibly the actual first of the Dáirine, for many generations the dominant military power from Munster, finally falling during the 6th century AD
- Dáire Doimthech, if actually different from Dáire mac Degad, and thus ancestor of the "other" Dáirine
- Lugaid Loígde, his son, if actually different from Lugaid Mac Con below
- Eochaid Étgudach, another son of Dáire Doimthech, but misplaced chronologically
- Nia Segamain, an actual ancestor or group of them of the Clanna Dergthened and thus the Eóganachta
  - Note (critical): actually attested in Munster ogham inscriptions, and in some pedigrees descendant(s) of the "other" Dáirine above
  - Note (in addition): probably wildly misplaced chronologically but considered of high status enough to make it to the legendary High King of Ireland lists
- Mug Nuadat, king in late sagas of Leth Mogha, or Mug's Half, meaning Southern Ireland
  - Note: belonged to the Deirgtine, but may be a mythological figure (Nuada)
- Ailill Aulom, Mug's son, aka Olioll Ólum, associated with the goddess Áine
  - Note: also called a druid in a very early source
- Lugaid Mac Con, was High King of Ireland, and Ailill's foster-son
  - Note: ancestor of the Corcu Loígde, principal later (3rd century and after) Munster sept of the Dáirine
- Éogan Mór, Ailill's son, from whom the Eóganachta took their name
  - Note: the Eóganachta were actually founded by Conall Corc, great-great-grandson of Eógan Mór
- Fiachu Muillethan, son of Éogan Mór
  - Note: a king of the Deirgtine of curious career, supported by Mug Ruith
- Ailill Flann Bec, son of Fiachu Muillethan
  - Note: almost nothing is known of this figure, except that he was adopted by and succeeded his elder brother, Ailill Flann Mór
- Dáire Cerbba, born in Brega of unclear parentage, usually (and obviously) assumed Dáirine but later written a son of Ailill Flann Bec
  - Note: called King of Medon Mairtine, once a very early capital of Munster, in one source, and progenitor of yet "another" sept of the Dáirine
- Óengus Bolg, an important late king of the Dáirine and (near) final sovereign ancestor (of Munster) from the Corcu Loígde
  - Note: features in early stories of Conall Corc, and is an ancestor of the Cashel Eóganachta septs, the "Inner Circle", through his daughter Aimend
- Crimthann mac Fidaig, was High King of Ireland and of territories overseas, and brother of the Queen and Goddess Mongfind
  - Note: considered Eóganacht (if vehemently opposed by them) in some dynastic traditions, but possibly a grandson of Dáire Cerbba (other sources)
- Bressal mac Ailello Thassaig, a King of Munster (one source only) from the early Uí Liatháin
  - Note: Angias, his sister, was the Queen of Lóegaire mac Néill, High King of Ireland and Emperor of the Barbarians

== Historical Kings of Cashel, Iarmuman, and Munster ==
There were not verifiable Eóganacht overkings of (all or most of) Munster until the early 7th century, after the Corcu Loígde had fallen entirely from power, some time after losing their grip on the Kingdom of Osraige and the support of the Muscraige and others. Thus the earlier kings below are best described as Kings of Cashel, Kings of Iarmuman, or Kings of the Eóganachta. Faílbe Flann mac Áedo Duib was the first Eóganacht to powerfully project outside Munster, but his Iarmuman relations were a significant rival of Cashel in his time, and not enough is known of many of his successors before Cathal mac Finguine, although the fragmentary nature of the surviving sources can to an extent be blamed.

At this time also flourished the semi-independent Uí Fidgenti and Uí Liatháin, a pair of shadowy sister kingdoms whose official origins appear to have been adjusted in the 8th century in a semi-successful (if ambiguously necessary) attempt to integrate them into the Eóganachta political structure and genealogical scheme. Effective relations and an alliance were achieved with the Uí Fidgenti, to the credit of Eóganacht strength, wealth and finesse, but for unknown reasons the Uí Liatháin remained effective outsiders except to Eóganacht Glendamnach.

Of the Eóganachta, unless noted.

=== Eóganacht Chaisil, –500 ===
Name	Portrait	Birth	Marriage(s)	Death
Corc mac Luigthig –		Son of Luigthech mac Ailill Flann Bec	Aimend several children	unknown
Nad Froích mac Cuirc –453		Son of Corc mac Luigthig	unknown	453
Óengus mac Nad Froích; 453–489		Son of Nad Froích mac Cuirc	Eithne Uathach purported to have had twenty-four sons and twenty-four daughters	489
Feidlimid mac Óengusa; 489–500		Son of Óengus mac Nad Froích	unknown	500

=== Eóganacht Glendamnach, 500–596 ===
Name	Portrait	Birth	Marriage(s)	Death
Eochaid mac Óengusa; 500–522		Son of Óengus mac Nad Froích	unknown	522
Crimthann Srem mac Echado; 522–542		Son of Eochaid mac Óengusa	unknown	542
Coirpre Cromm mac Crimthainn; 542–577		Son of Crimthann Srem mac Echado	unknown	577
Feidlimid mac Coirpri Chruimm; 577–596 (possible)		Son of Coirpre Cromm mac Crimthainn	unknown	596

=== Eóganacht Airthir Cliach, 577–582 ===
Name	Portrait	Birth	Marriage(s)	Death
Fergus Scandal mac Crimthainn; 577–582		Son of Crimthann Srem mac Echado	unknown	582

=== Eóganacht Raithlind, 582–588 ===
Name	Portrait	Birth	Marriage(s)	Death
Feidlimid mac Tigernaig; 582–588		Son of Tighearnach mac Aedh	unknown	588

=== Eóganacht Áine, 596–601 ===
Name	Portrait	Birth	Marriage(s)	Death
Amalgaid mac Éndai; 596–601		Son of Éndai	unknown	601
Garbán mac Éndai; 596–601		Son of Éndai	unknown	601

=== Eóganacht Chaisil, 601–618 ===
Name	Portrait	Birth	Marriage(s)	Death
Fíngen mac Áedo Duib; 601–618		Son of Áedo Duib	Mór Muman several children	618

=== Eóganacht Locha Léin, 618 ===
Name	Portrait	Birth	Marriage(s)	Death
Áed Bennán mac Crimthainn; 618		Son of Crimthainn mac Cobhtach	unknown	618

=== Eóganacht Glendamnach, 618–627 ===
Name	Portrait	Birth	Marriage(s)	Death
Cathal mac Áedo; 618–627		Son of Áed Fland Cathrach	Mór Muman several children	627

=== Eóganacht Chaisil, 627–639 ===
Name	Portrait	Birth	Marriage(s)	Death
Faílbe Flann mac Áedo Duib; 627–639		Son of Áedo Duib	unknown	639

=== Eóganacht Áine, 639–641 ===
Name	Portrait	Birth	Marriage(s)	Death
Cúán mac Amalgado; 639–641		Son of Amalgaid mac Éndai	unknown	641

=== Eóganacht Chaisil, 641–661 ===
Name	Portrait	Birth	Marriage(s)	Death
Máenach mac Fíngin; 641–661		Son of Fíngen mac Áedo Duib and Mór Muman	unknown	661

=== Eóganacht Glendamnach, 661–665 ===
Name	Portrait	Birth	Marriage(s)	Death
Cathal Cú-cen-máthair; 661–665		Son of Cathal mac Áedo	several children	665

=== Eóganacht Chaisil, 665–678 ===
Name	Portrait	Birth	Marriage(s)	Death
Colgú mac Faílbe Flaind; 665–678		Son of Faílbe Flann mac Áedo Duib	unknown	678

=== Eóganacht Glendamnach, 678–701 ===
Name	Portrait	Birth	Marriage(s)	Death
Finguine mac Cathail; 678–696		Son of Cathal Cú-cen-máthair	several children	696
Ailill mac Cathail; 696–701		Son of Cathal Cú-cen-máthair	unknown	701

=== Eóganacht Chaisil, 701–712 ===
Name	Portrait	Birth	Marriage(s)	Death
Cormac mac Ailello; 701–712		Son of Ailello mac Máenach	unknown	712

=== Eóganacht Áine, 712–721 ===
Name	Portrait	Birth	Marriage(s)	Death
Eterscél mac Máele Umai; 712–721		Son of Máel Umai mac Cúán	unknown	721

=== Eóganacht Glendamnach, 721–742 ===
Name	Portrait	Birth	Marriage(s)	Death
Cathal mac Finguine; 721–742		Son of Finguine mac Cathail	several children	742

=== Eóganacht Áine, 742–769 ===
Name	Portrait	Birth	Marriage(s)	Death
Cathussach mac Eterscélai; 742–769		Son of Eterscél mac Máele Umai	unknown	769

=== Eóganacht Locha Léin, 769–786 ===
Name	Portrait	Birth	Marriage(s)	Death
Máel Dúin mac Áedo; 769–786		Son of Áed Bennán mac Conaing	unknown	786

=== Eóganacht Áine, 786–805 ===
Name	Portrait	Birth	Marriage(s)	Death
Ólchobar mac Duib-Indrecht; 786–805 (Note: In the Annals of Ulster, Ólchobar mac Flainn of the Uí Fidgenti was confused with Ólchobar mac Duib-Indrecht of the Eóganacht Áine and claimed to have been a King of Munster. It is very likely that only Ólchobar mac Duib-Indrecht reigned in actuality (the confusion caused by a decline in Eóganachta fortunes).)		Son of Duib-Indrecht	unknown	805

=== Eóganacht Glendamnach, 805–820 ===
Name	Portrait	Birth	Marriage(s)	Death
Artrí mac Cathail; 805–820		Son of Cathal mac Finguine	one son	820
Tnúthgal mac Artrach – (Note: Tnúthgal mac Artrach of the Eóganacht Glendamnach is sometimes given as a king of Munster on some kings lists, but not in the Annals of Ireland. He died before his father, so it is possible that he never reigned. It is also possible that Tnúthgal mac Donngaile of the Eóganacht Chaisil has been confused with Tnúthgal mac Artrach.) (possible)		Son of Artrí mac Cathail	unknown	807

=== Eóganacht Chaisil, 820–847 ===
Name	Portrait	Birth	Marriage(s)	Death
Tnúthgal mac Donngaile; 807–820 (possible)		Son of Máel Donngaile	unknown	820
Feidlimid mac Cremthanin; 820–847		Son of Crimthainn	unknown	28 August 847

=== Eóganacht Áine, 847–851 ===
Name	Portrait	Birth	Marriage(s)	Death
Ólchobar mac Cináeda; 847–851		Son of Cináeda	unknown	851

=== Eóganacht Chaisil, 851–859 ===
Name	Portrait	Birth	Marriage(s)	Death
Áilgenán mac Donngaile; 851–853		Son of Donngaile	unknown	853
Máel Gualae mac Donngaile; 853–859		Son of Donngaile	one son	859

=== Eóganacht Áine, 859–872 ===
Name	Portrait	Birth	Marriage(s)	Death
Cenn Fáelad hua Mugthigirn; 859–872		Son of Mugthigirn	unknown	872

=== Eóganacht Chaisil, 872–908 ===
Name	Portrait	Birth	Marriage(s)	Death
Dúnchad mac Duib-dá-Bairenn; 872–888		Son of Duib-dá-Bairenn mac Crundmáel	unknown	888
Dub Lachtna mac Máele Gualae; 888–895		Son of Máel Gualae mac Donngaile	unknown	895
Finguine Cenn nGécan mac Loégairi; 895–902		Son of Loégairi mac Duib-dá-Bairenn	unknown	902
Cormac mac Cuilennáin; 902–908		Son of Cuilennáin mac Selbach	unknown	908

=== Múscraige, 908–944 ===
Name	Portrait	Birth	Marriage(s)	Death
Flaithbertach mac Inmainén; 908–944		Son of Inmainén	unknown	944

=== Eóganacht Chaisil, 944–957 ===
Name	Portrait	Birth	Marriage(s)	Death
Lorcán mac Coinlígáin; 944–		Son of Coinlígáin mac Corcrán	unknown	unknown
Cellachán Caisil –954		Son of Buadacháin mac Lachtnae	one son	954
Máel Fathardaig mac Flann; 954–957		Son of Flann mac Donnchad	one son	957

=== Eóganacht Raithlind, 957–959 ===
Name	Portrait	Birth	Marriage(s)	Death
Dub-dá-Bairenn mac Domnaill; 957–959		Son of Domnall mac Dub-dá-Bairenn	unknown	959

=== Eóganacht Chaisil, 959–963 ===
Name	Portrait	Birth	Marriage(s)	Death
Fer Gráid mac Clérig; 959–961		Son of Clérig mac Áilgenán	unknown	961
Donnchad mac Cellacháin; 959–963		Son of Cellachán Caisil	unknown	963

=== Eóganacht Raithlind, 959–978 ===
Name	Portrait	Birth	Marriage(s)	Death
Máel Muad mac Brain; 959–970; 976–978		Son of Brian	one son	978

=== Uí Ímair, 960–977 ===
Name	Portrait	Birth	Marriage(s)	Death
Ivar of Limerick; 960–977 (de facto)		uncertain	several children	977

=== Dál gCais, 970–1014 ===
Name	Portrait	Birth	Marriage(s)	Death
Mathgamain mac Cennétig; 970–976		Son of Cennétig mac Lorcáin	unknown	976
Brian Bóruma mac Cennétig; 978–1014		c. 941; Son of Cennétig mac Lorcáin and Bé Binn inion Urchadh	(1) Mór three sons (2) Echrad one son (3) Gormflaith one son	23 April 1014

=== Eóganacht Chaisil, 1014–1025 ===
Name	Portrait	Birth	Marriage(s)	Death
Dúngal Hua Donnchada; 1014–1025		Son of Máel Fathardaig mac Flann	unknown	1025

=== Ó Briain, 1025–1119 ===
Name	Portrait	Birth	Marriage(s)	Death
Donnchad mac Briain; 1025–1063		Son of Brian Bóruma and Gormflaith ingen Murchada	Cacht ingen Ragnaill; Three children	1064
Toirdhealbhach Ua Briain; 1063–1086		1009; Son of Tadc mac Briain and Mór	(1) Dubchoblaig; One son (2) Derbforgaill; Two sons	1086
Muircheartach Ua Briain; 1086–1114; 1118–1119		1050; Son of Toirdhealbhach Ua Briain	Derb Forgaill ingen Uí Laidcnén; Three children	1119
Diarmait Ua Briain; 1114–1118		1060; Son of Toirdhealbhach Ua Briain	unknown	1118
Brian Ua Briain; 1118		Son of Murchad mac Donnchada	unknown	1118

=== Mac Cárthaigh, 1127–1138 ===
Name	Portrait	Birth	Marriage(s)	Death
Cormac Mac Carthaigh; 1127–1138		Son of Muireadach Mac Carthaigh	unknown	1138

=== Ó Briain, 1138–1194 ===
Name	Portrait	Birth	Marriage(s)	Death
Conchobar Ua Briain; 1138–1142 (claimant)		Son of Diarmait Ua Briain	unknown	1142
Toirdhealbhach mac Diarmada Ua Briain; 1142–1167 (claimant)		Son of Diarmait Ua Briain	unknown	1167
Muirchertach mac Toirdelbhach Ua Briain; 1167–1168 (claimant)		Son of Toirdelbhach mac Diarmaida Ua Briain	unknown	1168
Domnall Mór Ua Briain; 1168–1194 (claimant)		Son of Toirdelbhach mac Diarmaida Ua Briain	Orlacan Ní Murchada; Four children	1194

== See also ==
- List of High Kings of Ireland
- List of kings of Ulster
- List of kings of Leinster
- List of kings of Connacht
- List of kings of Mide
- List of kings of Desmond
- List of kings of Thomond
