= Cenn Fáelad (disambiguation) =

Cenn Fáelad may refer to:

- Cenn Fáelad mac Blathmaic, High King of Ireland
- Cenn Fáelad mac Colgan, King of Connacht
- Cenn Fáelad hua Mugthigirn, King of Munster
- Cenn Fáelad mac Aillila, scholar
