= Tnúthgal mac Donngaile =

Tnúthgal mac Donngaile (or Tnúthgal mac Donngusa) (died 820) was a supposed King of Munster from the Eóganacht Chaisil branch of the Eoganachta. He was a fifth generation descendant of Colgú mac Faílbe Flaind (died 678), a previous king.

Tnúthgal appears in some king lists but this is suspect. He is not mentioned in the Irish annals and his death date of 820 is based on the accession of Feidlimid mac Cremthanin (died 847) in that year. A confusion between him and Tnúthgal mac Artrach (died circa 807) may have occurred.

His grandsons Áilgenán mac Donngaile (died 853) and Máel Gualae mac Donngaile (died 859) were Kings of Munster.
