= O'Donoghue of the Glens =

Irish clan chieftain

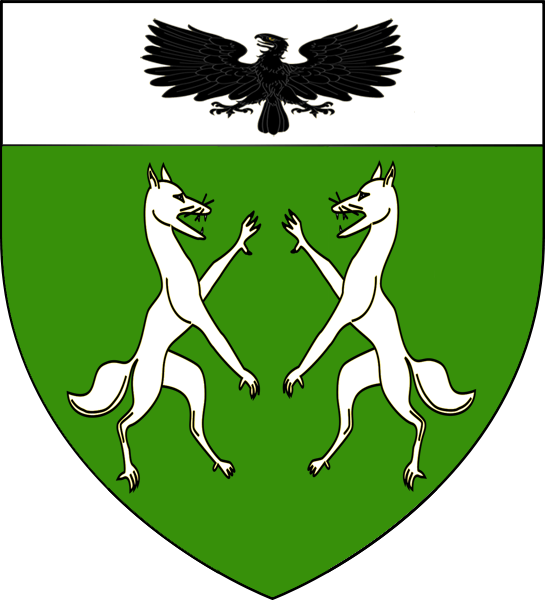
O'Donoghue.

The O'Donoghue of the Glens (Irish: Ó Donnchadha na nGleann), Prince of Glenflesk, is the hereditary chieftain of his sept of the Kerry Eóganacht, Munster, Ireland. In 1944, his father was one of the few Chiefs of the Name recognized by Edward MacLysaght, the first Chief Herald, as having a verifiable pedigree and entitled to use the title and receive courtesy recognition by the Irish State.

== Ancient heritage ==
The Eóganacht dynasties ruled the south of Ireland for 500 years or so till the end of the first millennium. According to the Irish origin myths, they descend from Eógan Mór II, son of Ailill Aulom, who was the son of Mug Nuadat, (Eógan Mór I), who was supposed to have lived some time in the 2nd century. Over the years, various septs of the Eóganacht branched off and some faded into insignificance. The O'Donoghue of the Glens is one of the Eóganacht lineages which remain to this day with an acknowledged Chief.

According to tradition, The O'Donoghue Mór and The O'Donoghue of the Glens descend from sons of Auliffe Mór O'Donoghue (d. 1158), Cathal and a younger son Conchobar, respectively (though Y-DNA evidence suggests they are of different lineages). Auliffe Mór's dynasty is that of the Cinel Laegarie of Eóganacht Raithlind/Uí Echach Muman, whose original territory was in West Cork prior to the time of Brian Boru, after which they invaded and secured the kingdom of the Eóganacht Locha Léin, displacing the Loch Lein O'Moriarty's and O'Carrolls.

== 12th century ==
There was much internecine war during the time of Auliffe Mór, when the O'Brien dynasty of Thomond were battling (ultimately unsuccessfully) for control of all Munster. The O'Briens were pressuring the Eóganacht from the north and the east, forcing them southwest into Kerry. The Cashel O'Donoghues, by then pressured by their Eóganacht cousins, the increasingly powerful MacCarthy dynasty, would surely have been amongst them.

Auliffe Mór was arguably one of the most powerful warlords of the time and it would not be unnatural for a weakened Eóganacht sept to join Auliffe Mór, who was successfully preventing the O'Briens from overrunning South Munster. He completed the cathedral of Achadh Dá Eó on the heights overlooking the Lakes of Killarney just prior to his death in 1158. It was during a campaign in Waterford that same year that Auliffe Mór was killed on the bank of the River Suir by Muircheartach son of Toirdhealbhach Ó Briain, well east of the MacCarthy territory, which indicates the scope of his efforts to maintain the sovereignty of Desmond.

In the following years, a number of sons of Auliffe Mór are recorded in the annals – Aed, slain 1161; Muirchertach, slain 1163; Murchad, died from wounds, 1169; Cathal (ancestor of the Mór) slain fighting the oversea men, 1170; Conchobar (ancestor of the Glens) slain 1178 ("la Donhnall, lá derbrathaire fein" added by a later hand and perhaps inaccurately translated as "by Domnall, his own 'brother'") 1178; Domnall, slain 1178.

== 13th–16th centuries ==
Next recorded in The Glens pedigree is Aoch na Meidhe (of the monks) (d 1231), then Séafra of the Mansion (d.1253) recorded as living in Glanarought on the Tousist peninsula. This is the first mention of the given name, which has been traditionally used through the generations of the family for eight centuries. According to Burke, the title first appeared in the 14th century with Geffery O'Donoghue of the Glynn. In the 16th century, the lands of The Glens comprised 'the wild glen of the Clydagh' and the parish of Killaha. Their family seat was Killaha Castle, overlooking the Glen of the Flesk River, built in the 16th century.

== 17th–20th centuries ==
In 1603 after the end of the Desmond Rebellions the Chief of the time was attainted as a result of his participation in the rebellion but was later able to regain his title and lands in 1609. The heart of rebellion still remained though, for in February 1642 Tadhg O'Donoghue and his three sons, Geoffrey, Tadhg and Daniel participated in the siege of Tralee Castle. In 1643, Geoffrey the Poet became Chief. He was noted for his lavish banquets at the top of Killaha Castle, but that all changed after the Cromwellian conquest of Ireland. He lamented:

Time was when I saw the Gaedhil in silks and in jewels,
Capable, propertied, earnest, perceptive, just,
Merry, sagacious, noble, lordly, intrepid,
Poetical, truthful, wine-loving, feasting – once.

In 1652 the castle was hit with newly employed cannon by General Ludlow's army and partially destroyed. The Chief was forced to flee into the fastness of the glen, but the Glens family remained in their territory. Lands in Glenflesk had been awarded to a number of English settlers in the Act of Settlement of that same year, but this wild place and its people was not conducive to English settlement and most of those English families soon abandoned their grants. After the Act of Settlement, one of Geoffrey's most often quoted stanzas is:

Alas, alas, how weak is nobility now!
The serving maids have cuffs and frilly lace;
Upstart in hats – a shoddy improvement, that!-
And torn-eared caps on people of noble race.

Glenflesk itself was known as the haunt of outlaws and tories, and in popular parlance the English referred to it as the 'Robbers Glen'. The dispossessed families of The O'Donoghue Mór had fled to the glens after the family's attainder in 1586 following Rory Mór's death at the end of the Desmond Rebellion, and they were no doubt the core of the rapparees inhabiting that stronghold in the Glen of the Flesk. They became notorious as the 'Dangerous O'Donoghues' who constantly harassed the English colony brought into the Killarney region by the undertaker Browne family, known as the Earl of Kenmare. In the late 18th century, the Glen was a haven during the Rightboy Movement which originated in Munster.

The Down Survey estimated the territory of The Glens to be five quarters, each of four ploughlands (a ploughland being roughly 120 acres), although this does not include the "unusable" lands controlled by the sept. It indicates that The Glens paid MacCarthy Mór forty shillings annually. 'No explanation is given as to why this clan was so slightly assessed.'

Throughout the centuries, the Glens family managed to retain their title and territory, and eventually built Killaha House near their ruined castle. The Chiefs were consistently devoted to Irish independence and one of the few Gaelic magnates who did not conform to the established Church. They remained in their territory throughout the years of English oppression, never faltering from their faith or deserting their clann.

In the middle of the 19th century Daniel Ó Donoghue, MP from Tralee, married Marie Sophie Ennis, the only daughter and heiress of Sir John Ennis. Upon the death of her father, the family moved to her estate at Ballynahown Court near Athlone. Killaha House became a Presbytery in 1887 and is currently in private hands. The ruined castle is now a national monument owned by the Office of Public Works.

== 21st century ==
The most recent Chief, Geoffrey Paul Vincent, lived near Tullamore in County Offaly til his death in October 2025. He was a member of The Standing Council of Irish Chiefs and Chieftains with a keen interest in Irish history.

== The O'Donoghues of the Glens ==
- Geoffrey the Poet (1620-1678)
- Daniel O'Donoghue
- Teague O'Donoghue
- Geoffrey O'Donoghue (1722-1758)
- Daniel O'Donoghue (d 1791)
- Charles O'Donoghue (1784-1808)
- Charles James (1806-1833)
- Daniel O'Donoghue (1831-1889)
- Geoffrey Charles Patrick O'Donoghue (1859–1935)
- Geoffrey Charles Patrick Randal O'Donoghue (1896–1974)
- Geoffrey Paul Vincent O'Donoghue (born 1937, died October 14th 2025)

== See also ==
- Irish nobility
- Irish royal families
- Ross Castle
- Eóganachta
