= Máel Dúin mac Áedo Bennán =

Máel Dúin mac Áedo Bennán (died 661) was a King of Iarmuman (west Munster) from the Eóganacht Locha Léin branch of the Eoganachta. He was the son of Áed Bennán mac Crimthainn (died 618), who may have been King of all Munster. His uncle Áed Dammán (died 634) is called King of Iarmumu in his death obit giving Máel Dúin a possible reign of 633–661.

Some of the events of his reign concern a feud with the Glendamnach sept of the Eoganachta. The roots of this feud are found in an old saga poem Mór Muman and the Violent Death of Cuanu mac Ailchine. During the reign of Cathal mac Áedo Flaind Chathrach (died 627) of Munster, the husband of Aed Bennan's daughter Ruithchern, Lonán mac Findig, was murdered by Cuanu mac Ailchine (died 644) of the Fir Maige Féne who abducts Ruithchern. They were on their way to seek shelter in Iarmuman and Cathal was blamed for not ensuring their safety.

Warfare then ensued between the two septs of the Eoganachta. The battle of Cenn Con in Munster between Mael Dúin and Aengus Liath (died 644) of Glendamnach (the brother of Cathal) was fought in 644 with much slaughter on both sides and Mael Dúin was put to flight.

His son Congal mac Máele Dúin (died 690) was also King of Iarmuman.
