= Táin Bó Regamon =

Irish story written c. A.D.800–c. A.D. 900

The Táin Bó Regamon is an Irish story written c. A.D.800–c. A.D. 900. A version of it exists in the Yellow Book of Lecan.

One of the Táin Bó tales of early Irish literature, the Táin Bó Regamon was by one of more authors during the 9th century and linguistically belongs to the Old Irish era. It is found in Egerton 1782.

It tells the story of the Connachtman Regamon - apparently a misspelling of Regamain - who is described as "a famous warrior and hospitaller". He is described as living at a dún ('fort') "in the south of Connacht near to the boundary of the Corcmodruad (Corcomroe (barony)) in Nindus (see Eóganacht Ninussa).

His seven daughters contest the seven sons of Queen Medb and King Ailill over "a gift from his herd ... because of this difficulty which is upon us in maintaining the men of Ireland in driving off the cattle of Cúailnge."

== Select bibliography ==
- "Táin Bó Regamon", Danielle Malek (ed), First edition [One volume. vi + 89 pp.] University of Sydney, 2002
