= Coirpre Luachra mac Cuirc =

Coirpre Luachra mac Cuirc (flourished mid 5th century) was the ancestor of the Eóganacht Locha Léin branch of the Eoganachta, the ruling dynasty of Munster. This branch was also called the Ui Caipre Luachra, named after him and became the rulers of Iarmuman (West Munster). He was the son of Conall Corc mac Luigthig, founder of the Eoganachta kingdom of Cashel in Munster.

Coirpre is mentioned in genealogical tracts of the Eoganachta. According to these tracts he was the son of Conall Corc by Mongfind daughter of Feredach, King of the Picts of Scotland. Hence the alternate name for him Coirpre Cruithneachán (the little Pict). He was fathered while Conall Corc was on a sojourn in Scotland- probably related to raids on Roman Britain. At some point after Conall Corc had established the kingdom of Cashel. Coirpre arrived to claim his inheritance. However, he slew his father's steward and so was cursed by his father and banished to west Munster. His by name Luachra comes from the Sliabh Luachra mountains which separated west Munster from the rest of Munster.

Coirpre's son Maine mac Coirpri (or Maithne) was given the stewardship of west Munster as was his grandson Dauí Iarlaithe mac Maithni who turned the stewardship into a semi-independent kingdom of Cashel.

== See also ==
- House of Óengus
