= Congal mac Máele Dúin =

Congal mac Máele Dúin (died 690) was a King of Iarmuman (west Munster) from the Eóganacht Locha Léin branch of the Eoganachta, the ruling dynasty of Munster. He was the son of Máel Dúin mac Áedo Bennán (died 661), previous king of Iarmuman and grandson of Áed Bennán mac Crimthainn (died 618), who may have been King of all Munster. He ruled from 661 to 690.

He is listed in a legal tract of Munster called the Cain Fuithirbe promulgated in the reign of Finguine mac Cathail (died 696) in 683. The Annals of Ulster record his death with the title King of Iarmuman in 690. The annals agree that he was killed or slain and according to the Chronicum Scotorum this was done by a scolasticus.
