= Cormac mac Ailello =

Cormac mac Ailello (died 712) was a king of Munster from the Eóganacht Chaisil branch of the Eoganachta and the Cenél Fíngin sept of this branch. He was the grandson of Máenach mac Fíngin (died 661), a previous king. He succeeded Eterscél mac Máele Umai (died 721) in 702 who had abdicated.

The annals report that Cormac fought wars in north Munster. In 710, Cormac harried the area of Cliú (in N.E.Co.Limerick). In 712, he fought the Battle of Carn Feradaig (Cahernarry, Co. Limerick) in Cliú against the Dál gCais or Déis Tuaiscirt of Thomond. He was defeated and slain. He was succeeded by Cathal mac Finguine (died 742).

== See also ==
- Kings of Munster

Cormac mac Ailello Eóganachta
Regnal titles
Preceded by Eterscél mac Máele Umai	King of Cashel c. 702 – 712	Succeeded by Cathal mac Finguine
