= Táin Bó =

Genre of early Irish literature

The Táin Bó, or cattle raid (literally "driving-off of cows"), is one of the genres of early Irish literature. The medieval Irish literati classified their work into genres such as the Cattle Raid (Táin Bó), adventure (Echtra), the Voyage (Imram), the Feast (Fled or Feis), the Wooing (Tochmarc), the Conception (Compert) and the Death (Aided), rather than the familiar but relatively modern division into cycles.

== Táins ==
Táin Bó Cúailnge, "the Cattle Raid of Cooley" or simply The Táin, is by far the best known to modern audiences. Likewise, this was the táin (gen. sing. tána, pl. táinte) best known to this literature's audience from the 11th to the 14th century and is the central story of the Ulster Cycle. Its likely this story had a similar prominence in the endemic oral literature before medieval Christian redactors put them in written form.

There are also many lesser táinte. Some of these are known only by name, but most of them are extant and have been translated into the English language. Among these are the following:

- Táin Bó Flidaise - "The Cattle Raid of Flidais"
- Táin Bó Aingen - "The Cattle Raid of Aingen", also known as Echtra Nerae (see also Nera)
- Táin Bó Dartada - "The Cattle Raid of Dartaid"
- Táin Bó Ere
- Táin Bó Fraích - "The Cattle Raid of Fráech" (see also Fráech)
- Táin Bó Munad
- Táin Bó Regamna - "The Cattle Raid of Regamain"
- Táin Bó Regamon - "The Cattle Raid of Regamon"
- Táin Bó Ros
- Táin Bó Ruanadh
- Táin Bó Sailin

It seems to have been customary in ancient Ireland to precede the recital of "The Great Táin" and other very long tales with a number of shorter stories. These preludes, or remscéla, are sometimes incorrectly regarded as a part of the Táin Bó Cúailnge due to the static nature of printed and bound materials. This misconception is enforced by the fact that the Thomas Kinsella translation, which contains eight remscéla chosen by the translator, has been popular for three decades.

Many of the lesser tána were well-suited to serve as remscéla as these could be framed as preludes to the epic events at Cúailnge. For example, a surviving recension of Táin Bó Fraích ends with the segue:

They brought their cows over it thither. It is there they flung their horns from them... Fraech goes away then to his territory after, and his wife, and his sons, and his cows with him, until he goes with Ailill and Medb for the Spoil of the Cows from Cualnge.

Similarly, the Táin Bó Regamain ends with:

A treaty was then made between them on account of the fair young men who had carried off the cattle, and on account of the fair maidens who had gone with them, by whose means the herd escaped. Restitution of the herd was awarded to Regamon, and the maidens abode with the sons of Ailill and Medb; and seven times twenty milch-cows were given up, as a dowry for the maidens, and for the maintenance of the men of Ireland on the occasion of the assembly for the Tain bo Cualnge; so that this tale is called the Tain bo Regamon, and it is a prelude to the tale of the Tain bo Cualnge. Finit, amen.

Besides these many stories from among the other genres are well connected with the Táin Bó Cúailnge through shared characters and would be suited for preludes as well. The birth tales of characters such as Conchobar mac Nessa and Conall Cernach suit this purpose, as does any tale featuring Cúchulainn, ranging from his birth tale to the Wooing of Emer.
