= Garbán mac Éndai =

Garbán mac Éndai (flourished 596) was a King of Munster from the Eóganacht Áine branch of the Eoganachta and appears as the first king from this branch with his brother Amalgaid mac Éndai. The chronology of the Munster kings from this period is unclear due to inconsistency in sources. The Annals of Tigernach mention him as king in 596, along with his brother Amalgaid. He is also mentioned as king in The Book of Leinster. However, the pro-Glendamnach Laud Synchronisms omit him, as does the saga of Senchas Fagbála Caisil "The Story of the Finding of Cashel".

== See also ==
- Kings of Munster

== Notes ==
Garbán mac Éndai Eóganachta
Regnal titles
Preceded by Feidlimid mac Coirpri Chruimm	King of Cashel c. 596 – 601 with Amalgaid mac Éndai (c. 596–601)	Succeeded by Fíngen mac Áedo Duib
