= Máel Dúin mac Áedo =

Máel Dúin mac Áedo (died 786) was a possible King of Munster from the Eóganacht Locha Léin branch of the Eóganachta. He was the son of Áed Bennán mac Conaing (died 733), a king of Iarmuman or West Munster and great great grandson of Áed Bennán mac Crimthainn (died 618) who may have been King of all Munster.

The Eóganacht Locha Léin branch ruled in west Munster or Iarmumu with authority over the surrounding peoples and were semi-independent of the ruling inner circle of Eóganachta ruling from Cashel. Máel Dúin possibly succeeded to the throne of Iarmumu in 747 when Cairpre son of Cú Dínisc was slain at the Battle of Carn Ailche (possibly Carnelly, County Clare) in a civil war amongst the men of Munster.

His accession to the throne of Munster cannot be dated with certainty. His accession broke the rotation of the Munster throne among the inner circle Eóganachta. The records become obfuscated for the later 8th century after the reign of the powerful Cathal mac Finguine (died 742). Cathal's successor Cathussach mac Eterscélai is only known from king lists and the Laud Synchronisms give him a reign of 27 years which would put the end of his reign in 769. However the annals record activity of Máel Dúin prior to this who is not included in the king lists.

The earliest record of Máel Dúin is in 757 when the Annals of Tigernach record that Cummascach, King of the Leinster tribe of Uí Failge of Offaly was slain by him and he is referred to as king of Munster. The Annals of Innisfallen (a pro-Munster source) and the Annals of Ulster (a more primary chronicle) are however silent on this. He is next mentioned in the Annals of Innsifallen under the year 766 where he was defeated by the Uí Fidgenti and the Arad Cliach of County Limerick at the Battle of Énboth Breg. In this mention he is not given a title. His next mention is in his death obit in 786. In the Annals of Ulster he is styled only King of Irluachair (Iarmumu or west Munster) while in the Annals of Innsifallen he is King of Munster.

During his supposed reign the high king Donnchad Midi of Clann Cholmáin made an expedition into Munster in 775 causing great devastation and many men of Munster were slain. The next year with the support of the men of Durrow monastery, the high king made another expedition in 776 which led to a pitched battle and many men of Munster were slain. In 779 a civil war is recorded among the men of Munster which involved the affairs of Desmond (South Munster), the King of Eóganacht Raithlind, Fergal son of Éladach, was slain by Breislén of Béirre (the Bear barony of County Cork - a territory of the Corcu Loígde). The Law of Saint Ailbe was also promulgated in 784. Máel Dúin's name is not directly connected with these events in the Annals.

He was succeeded as king of Iarmumu by Cú Chongelt mac Cairpri (died 791). His son Cobthach mac Máel Dúin (died 833) was king of Loch Léin. Following the death of Máel Dúin the Locha Lêin branch of the Eóganachta fell into decline. Máel Dúin is mentioned in the West Munster Synod as the last king of Iarmumu who would rull over the Ciarraige. This is conventionally seen as a rebellion by West Munster septs against Eóganacht Loch Léin.
