= O'Keeffe =

Family name

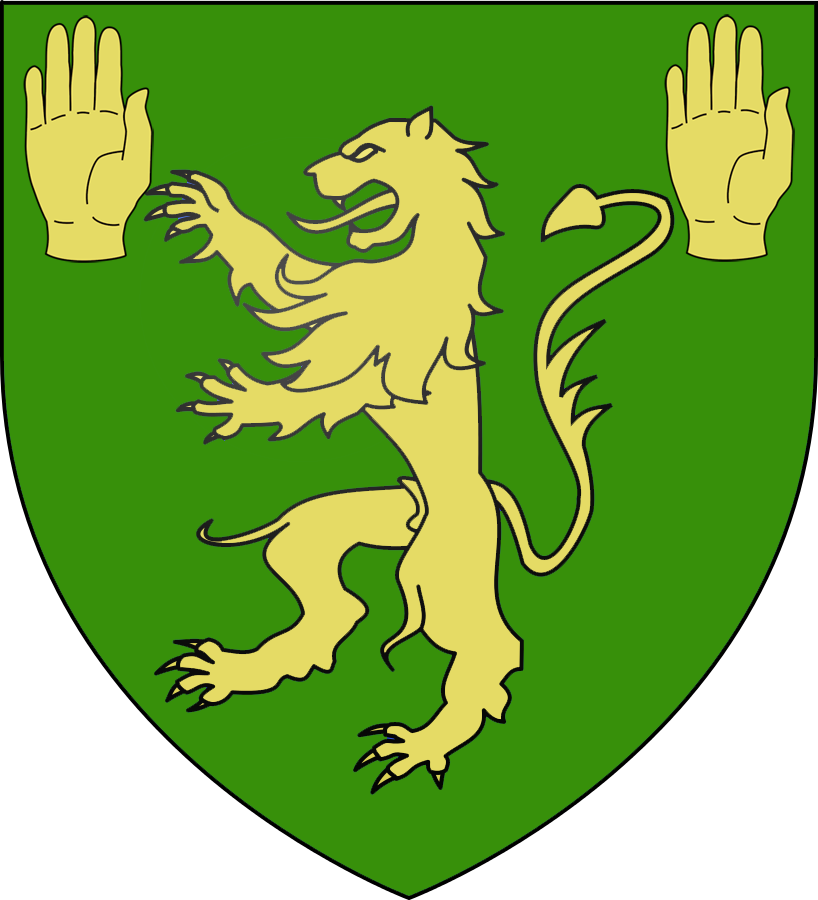
Ó Caoimh arms

Ó Caoimh (English: O'Keeffe) is an Irish Gaelic clan based most prominently in what is today County Cork, particularly around Fermoy and Duhallow. The name comes from caomh, meaning "kind", "gentle", "noble" Some reformed spellings present it as Ó Cuív and the feminine form of the original is Ní Chaoimh, as the primary sept of the Eóganacht Glendamnach, the family were once Kings of Munster from the 6th to the 8th centuries.

== Naming conventions ==
| Male | Daughter | Wife (Long) | Wife (Short) |
|---|---|---|---|
| Ó Caoimh | Ní Chaoimh | Bean Uí Chaoimh | Uí Chaoimh |

== History ==
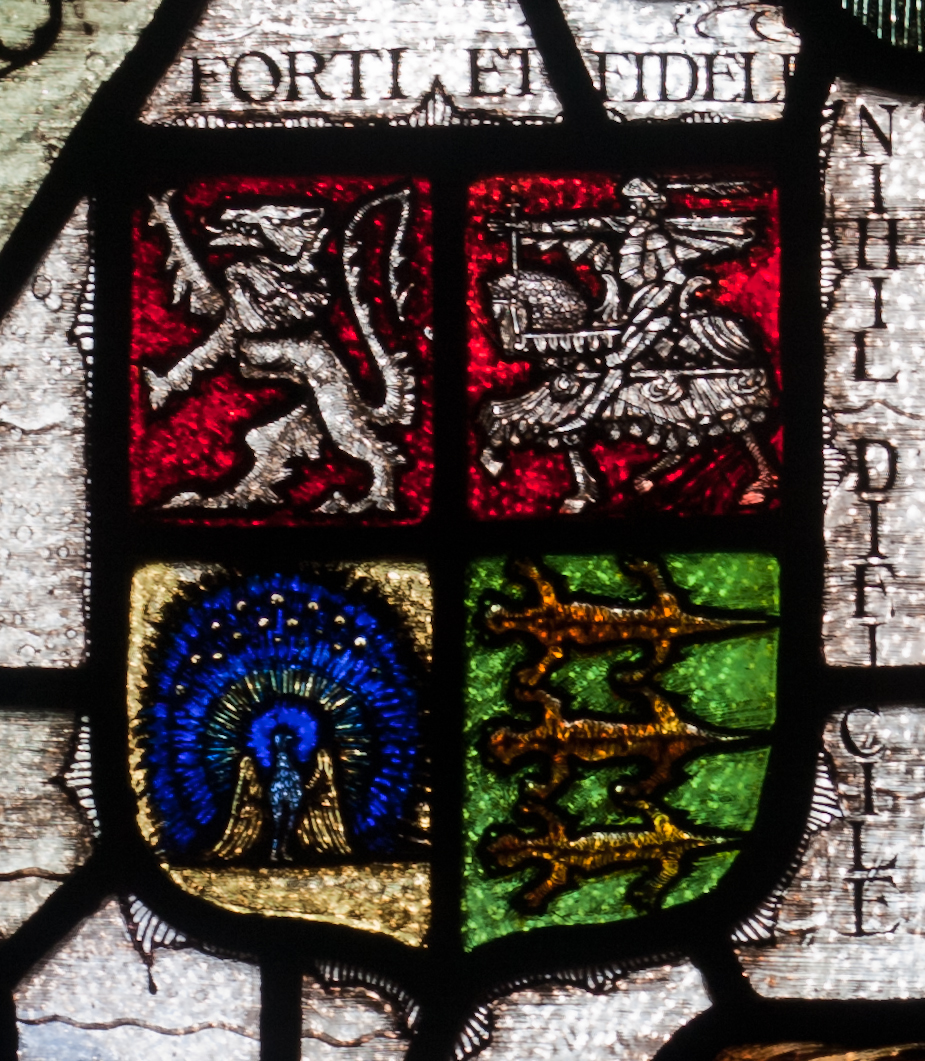
Coat of arms and motto forti et fideli nihil difficile on a stained glass window in Wexford by Harry Clarke

The original Caomh, from whom the family descend, lived in the early eleventh century, and was descended from Cathal mac Finguine, celebrated King of Munster and the most powerful Irish king of the first half of the 8th century. See the main article, Eóganachta, for more discussion, as well as Eóganacht Glendamnach, the specific sept of the family.

The O'Keeffes are famous for claiming descent from the goddess Clíodhna and have a beloved story about her marriage to Caomh (Franklin, pp. 81 ff). Her sister Aibell competed for his affections but Clíodhna ultimately triumphed using sorcery.

For all of their history the family has been strongly associated with County Cork. Originally the territory of the family lay along the banks of the Blackwater river, near modern Fermoy, and were active in the wars of the twelfth century between the O'Conors and the Eoghanacht dynasties of Munster.

However, the arrival of the Normans displaced them, like so many others, and they moved west into the barony of Duhallow, where their territory became known, and is still known, as Pobal O'Keeffe, where the senior branch of the family had their seat at Dromagh in Dromtarriff Parish.

The last chiefs of this branch were Domhnall O'Keeffe of Dromagh (d. c. 1655), who was prominent in the Catholic Rebellion of the 1640s, and his son Captain Daniel O'Keeffe, who was killed fighting for King James at the Battle of Aughrim in 1691. The family estates were confiscated in 1703, and sold to the Hollow Blades Company.

Even today, Pobal O'Keeffe is still the area in which the name is most common, with surrounding areas of County Cork also including many of the name. It remains relatively rare outside that county. In 1890, more than two-thirds of the births under the name are recorded in County Cork.

Like many of the dispossessed Irish nobility, the O'Keeffes were active in the service of the Catholic monarchs of Europe. In 1740 Constantine O'Keeffe (born c. 1670) was admitted to the French aristocracy on the basis of his Irish pedigree, and his long service. The bearers of the surname "Cuif", found in the Champagne district of northern France, are descendants of O'Keeffe soldiers.

== Ó Caoimh ==
- Brian Ó Cuív (1916–1999), (Ó Caoimh)
- Éamon Ó Cuív (born 1950), Irish politician

== People named O'Keeffe ==
- Alfred Henry O'Keeffe (1858–1941), New Zealand artist and art teacher
- Batt O'Keeffe (born 1945), Irish politician
- Ben O'Keeffe, doctor and New Zealand professional rugby referee
- Bob O'Keeffe (1881–1949), Irish hurler
- Ciarán O'Keeffe English psychologist specialising in parapsychology and forensic psychology
- Corey O'Keeffe (born 1998), English footballer
- Cristin O'Keefe Aptowicz (born 1978), American non-fiction writer and poet
- Daniel O'Keeffe (judge), barrister and Irish High Court judge
- Dan O'Keeffe (died 1967), Irish footballer
- Danny O'Keefe, American singer-songwriter based in Seattle, Washington
- David O'Keeffe (lawyer), Irish jurist, professor of European law
- David O'Keeffe (footballer) (born 1962), former Australian rules footballer
- Declan O'Keeffe, retired Irish footballer
- Denis O'Keeffe, Irish hurler
- Dennis O'Keeffe (1939–2014), British professor of social science
- Eamonn O'Keefe (born 1953), English-born Irish former footballer
- Eileen O'Keeffe (born 1981), Irish former international hammer and discus thrower
- Eoin O'Keeffe, Irish composer based in the UK
- Fiona O'Keeffe (born 1998), American long-distance runner
- Frank O'Keeffe (1896–1924), Australian cricketer
- Georgia O'Keeffe (1887–1986), American artist
- Ger O'Keeffe, retired Irish footballer
- Hank O'Keeffe (1923–2011), American basketball player
- Ida O'Keeffe (1889–1961), American artist
- Jessy Keeffe (born 1996), Australian rules footballer
- James Keeffe (18th century), Irish Roman Catholic bishop
- James O'Keeffe (died 1986), Irish Fine Gael politician
- Jim Keeffe (1919–1988), Australian politician
- Jim O'Keeffe (born 1941), Irish politician
- John O'Keeffe (writer) (1747–1833), Irish playwright
- Jonathan O'Keeffe (born 1977), birth name of Irish actor Jonathan Rhys Meyers
- Kain O'Keeffe, Australian actor
- Kerry O'Keeffe (born 1949), Australian cricketer and sports commentator
- Kevin O'Keeffe (footballer) (born 1952), former Australian rules footballer
- Kristin Bair O'Keeffe (born 1966), American novelist
- Lachlan Keeffe (born 1990), Australian rules footballer
- Laurence O'Keeffe (1931/1932–2003), British diplomat, ambassador to Czechoslovakia during the 'Velvet Revolution'
- Miles O'Keeffe, American actor
- Molly O'Keefe, American author
- Natasha O'Keeffe, English actress
- Ned O'Keeffe (born 1942), Irish politician
- Paddy O'Keeffe, Irish hurler
- Padraig O'Keeffe (died 1963), Irish traditional musician
- Pat O'Keeffe (1883–1960), English boxer
- Patrick O'Keeffe (politician) (1881–1973), Irish politician
- Patrick O'Keeffe (writer), Irish-American short story writer
- Peggy O'Keefe (1928–2019), Australian-Scottish pianist
- Rhys O'Keeffe (born 1990), Australian rules footballer
- Sean O'Keeffe (born 1982), Australian rules footballer
- Susan O'Keeffe (born 1960), Irish politician and journalist
- Timothy O'Keeffe (1926–1994), Irish editor and publisher
- Trevor O'Keeffe (1967/1968–1987), Irish man who was murdered while hitchhiking in France
- Paddy O'Keeffe (born 1943) lrish actor

== Fictional characters ==
- V.III O'Keeffe, Armored Core VI: Fires of Rubicon (2023)

== See also ==
- Clídna
- Eóganachta
- Eóganacht Glendamnach
- His Majesty O'Keefe, a 1954 adventure film, as well as the 1952 book of the same name, from which the film derives
- Irish nobility
- Irish royal families
