= Máenach mac Fíngin =

King of Munster

Máenach mac Fíngin (died 661) was a King of Munster from the Eóganacht Chaisil branch of the Eoganachta. He was the son of Fíngen mac Áedo Duib (died 618), a previous king. His mother was Mór Muman (died 636), daughter of Áed Bennán mac Crimthainn of the Loch Lein. He succeeded Cúán mac Amalgado as king in 641 The annals provide no details of his reign. His son Aillil was father of a later king of Munster Cormac mac Ailello (died 713).

== See also ==
- Kings of Munster

Máenach mac Fíngin Eóganachta
Regnal titles
Preceded by Cúán mac Amalgado	King of Cashel c. 641 – 661	Succeeded by Cathal Cú-cen-máthair
