= Crimthann Srem mac Echado =

Crimthann Srem mac Echado (died circa 542), also known as Crimthann Feimin, was a King of Munster from the Eoganachta dynasty in the early 6th century. He was the son of Eochaid mac Óengusa (died 522) and grandson of the first Christian king of Munster, Óengus mac Nad Froích (died 489).

The Annals of Tigernach record him succeeding his father and becoming king of Munster in 522. According to the Laud Synchronisms, he ruled for twenty years, which places his death at 542. The record of 6th-century kings in Munster is obscure and the Laud Synchronisms may have been written to favour his dynasty. The saga Senchas Fagbála Caisil ("The Story of the Finding of Cashel") omits him from its list of kings while the list in the Book of Leinster includes him.

He was the ancestor of the Eoganacht Glendamnach (Glanworth, County Cork) branch of the family. He had five sons including Coirpre Cromm mac Crimthainn (died 577), a king of Munster. The genealogies give him a twin brother Crimthann, son of a woman named Dearcon, who was an ancestor of the Airthir Cliach branch (around Tipperary town). It is possible that the genealogies created two separate Crimthanns. In which case he would be the Crimthann, son of Dearcon mentioned in a tract relating to a Munster synod in the 6th century

Crimthann Srem mac Echado Eóganachta
Regnal titles
Preceded by Eochaid mac Óengusa	King of Cashel c. 522 – 542	Succeeded by Coirpre Cromm mac Crimthainn
