= Ólchobar mac Cináeda =

Ólchobar mac Cináeda (died 851) was King of Munster from 847 until his death. He may be the "king of the Irish" who sent an embassy to Frankish Emperor Charles the Bald announcing a series of victories over Vikings in Ireland in 848.

== Origins ==
Ólchobar was previously thought to have belonged to the Locha Léin branch of the Eóganachta, the kindred which dominated the kingship of Munster from the 6th to the late 10th centuries, whose lands lay around the Lakes of Killarney. More recent research however has shown that he was more likely a member of the Eóganacht Áine branch of the dynasty. This branch, found in the east of modern County Limerick, was part of the inner circle of Eoganachta which had rotated the kingship of Munster since the 7th century. The Eóganacht Áine provided several abbots of Emly in the 9th century.

Ólchobar is believed to have been abbot of Emly, the principal church of the Eóganachta, before he was chosen as king. His predecessor, the powerful Feidlimid mac Crimthainn, is the first king of Munster known to have combined clerical office with the kingship. This combination of secular and religious power appears to have been unique to Munster in the ninth and tenth centuries. Several of the kings who held abbacies as well as the kingship, Ólchobar among them but also the better known Cormac mac Cuilennáin, are thought to have been compromise candidates for the kingship.

== Vikings ==
Some of the Irish annals, among them the Chronicon Scotorum, record that early in Ólchobar's reign Emly was attacked by a Viking force. In 848, a year which saw multiple defeats for the Vikings, Ólchobar joined forces with his eastern neighbour, Lorcán mac Cellaig, King of Leinster, to defeat a Viking army at Sciath Nechtain, near modern Castledermot, County Kildare. Early sources say two hundred Vikings were killed, later ones increase the number of dead, among them one Tomrair, jarl and deputy of the king of Laithlind. Later in the year the Cashel branch of the Eóganachta inflicted a defeat on Vikings at Dún Maíle Tuile, near Cashel. Further victories had been won in the west, in modern County Sligo, by the High King Máel Sechnaill mac Máele Ruanaid and his ally Tigernach mac Fócartai.

Late in 848 Ólchobar is said to have set up a camp from which the Vikings at Cork were blockaded. The result of this siege is nowhere recorded. This is the first mention of the Vikings at Cork. They are not heard of again until 865. It has been suggested that these several campaigns against Vikings were a coordinated effort by the chief Irish kings.

== King of the Irish? ==
Following this series of victories over the Vikings, Annales Bertiniani record the arrival of an embassy at the court of the Frankish Emperor Charles the Bald:

The Irish attacked the Vikings and with the help of our Lord Jesus Christ they were victorious and drove them out of their territory. For that reason, the king of the Irish sends ambassadors with gifts to Charles for the sake of peace and friendship and with the request to allow him free passage to Rome.

The identity of the "king of the Irish" is not certain. He has been identified with Máel Sechnaill mac Máele Ruanaid. However, a case has also been made to identify him with Ólchobar. It is suggested that Sedulius Scottus, a Leinsterman, formed part of the embassy, and that an embassy from the south would be more likely to be organised by the king of Munster rather than the High King. Nothing further is recorded of Ólchobar after 848 until his death in 851. If he was the "king of the Irish", no record of a pilgrimage to Rome has survived.

== Notes ==
Ólchobar mac Cináeda Eóganachta
Regnal titles
Preceded by Feidlimid mac Cremthanin	King of Munster c. 847 – 851	Succeeded by Áilgenán mac Donngaile
