= Ferghus Scannal mac Crimthainn =

Ferghus Scannal mac Crimthainn ("Fergus of the Disputes, son of Crimthann"; died AD 582) (although the Annals of the Four Masters note the death occurred in the year 580) was a king of Munster from the Eóganacht Airthir Cliach branch of the Eoganachta, the ruling dynasty of Munster. His name Scannal meaning "quarrel, contention", from Latin scandalum, and is the earliest known use of the Scannal name. He was the son of Crimthann Dearcon mac Eochaid and great-grandson of Óengus mac Nad Froích (died 489) the first Christian king of Munster. This branch had their lands around Tipperary town.

He is mentioned in king lists such as the Laud Synchronisms and the Book of Leinster. According to the Annals of Tigernach, he succeeded Coirpre Cromm mac Crimthainn as king in 577 but was slain shortly thereafter in 582. This annal contradicts itself by stating that he ruled for seven years. According to Eogannacht sources, he was slain by the Leinstermen who forfeited Osraige to Munster as a blood-fine for this deed. Prof. Byrne dismisses this as later Osraige propaganda however

Ferghus Scannal mac Crimthainn Eóganachta
Regnal titles
Preceded by Coirpre Cromm mac Crimthainn	King of Cashel c. 577 – 582 with Feidlimid mac Coirpri Chruimm (c. 577–582)	Succeeded by Feidlimid mac Coirpri Chruimm
