= Kristin Bair O'Keeffe =

American novelist

- Occupation: Novelist, essayist and educator
- Education: Bethel Park High School; Indiana University (BA); Columbia College Chicago (MFA)

Kristin Bair O'Keeffe (born 1966) is an American novelist, essayist and educator. She is the author of Agatha Arch Is Afraid of Everything, The Art of Floating, and Thirsty, which focused on issues related to domestic violence.

== Biography ==
O'Keeffe graduated from Bethel Park High School. She earned a Bachelor of Arts from the Indiana University and a Master of Fine Arts from the Columbia College Chicago.

O'Keeffe is the author of three novels: Agatha Arch Is Afraid of Everything, The Art of Floating, and Thirsty, which focused on issues related to domestic violence.

She previously lived in Shanghai with her husband and daughter before moving to Boston, Massachusetts.
