= Eóganacht Raithlind =

Historic Irish dynasty

Eóganacht Raithlind or Uí Echach Muman are a branch of the Eóganachta, the ruling dynasty of Munster in southwest Ireland during the 5th-10th centuries. They took their name from Raithlinn or Raithleann described around the area of Bandon, in the same area. Archaeologists believe that Garranes Ringfort in Templemartin parish, near Bandon, County Cork may have been Rath Raithleann, the royal seat of the Eóganacht Raithleann. They are descended from Mac Cass, the son of Conall Corc, the first King of Cashel, through Mac Cass' son Echu.

== History ==
In the 6th century the Uí Echach Muman split into two major groups; the Uí Láegaire and the Cenel nÁeda. The Cenel nÁeda were descended from Echu's grandson Áed Ualgarb mac Crimthainn. They gave their name to the barony of Kinalea in southern County Cork. An important sub-sept of the Cenel nÁeda were the Cénel mBéicce, descended from Bécc mac Fergusa (died 661) who gave their name to the barony of Kinelmeaky. They later became the O Mathghamhna or O'Mahonys. Máel Muad mac Brain belonged to this branch.

The Cenél Láegaire were descended from Echu's grandson Lóegaire mac Crimthainn and expanded westward toward Bantry as early as the 8th century. They were later represented by Ua Donnchadha, or O'Donoghues, a sept whose chiefs later settled in County Kerry. This branch are still represented among the Gaelic nobility of Ireland by the O'Donoghue of the Glens, Prince of Glenflesk.

Members of the Raithlind branch only rarely held the throne of all Munster. According to tradition Mac Cass died before his father and so Conall Corc took his son's inheritance and instead imposed his grandson Echu in the south thereby excluding them from the inner circle of Eoganachta. The Raithlind branch was semi-independent in the south in the territory of Desmond or South Munster, though they may have been subject to the Eóganacht Locha Léin at times during the height of their power in the late 6th and 7th centuries. In any event, following that era the O'Donoghues eventually gained the advantage in the region with Cashel also having a hand in the interim dynamics.

== See also ==
- Carbery
- Iarmuman
