= Eóganacht Ninussa =

The Eóganacht Ninussa were a branch of the Eóganacht dynasty. According to Francis John Byrne,

"were settled in Northwest Clare 1 and Aran presumably since the conquest of that are in the 5th century, and were important enough to be grouped as one of the seven main branches of the Eóganachta at some stage in the compilation of the Lebor Gabála (in the 8th century ?). They were sufficiently well known c. 900 to furnish the hero of a popular saga 2 but seem to have been eclipsed by the end of the 10th century, and find no place in the Annals or the genealogies. The few later references are vague and tantalizing rather than informative and give the impressive of being of a pseudo-antiquarian nature. Their one concrete frlic is the village (and fort ?) of Onaght 3 in Aran;"

- 1 Corcomroe and The Burren
- 2 Ailill Ochair Ága, father of the protagonist, Immran Curaig Maíle Dúin
- 3 The village of Onaght, and the fort of Dún Aonghasa
