= Eóganachta =

Historic Irish dynasty

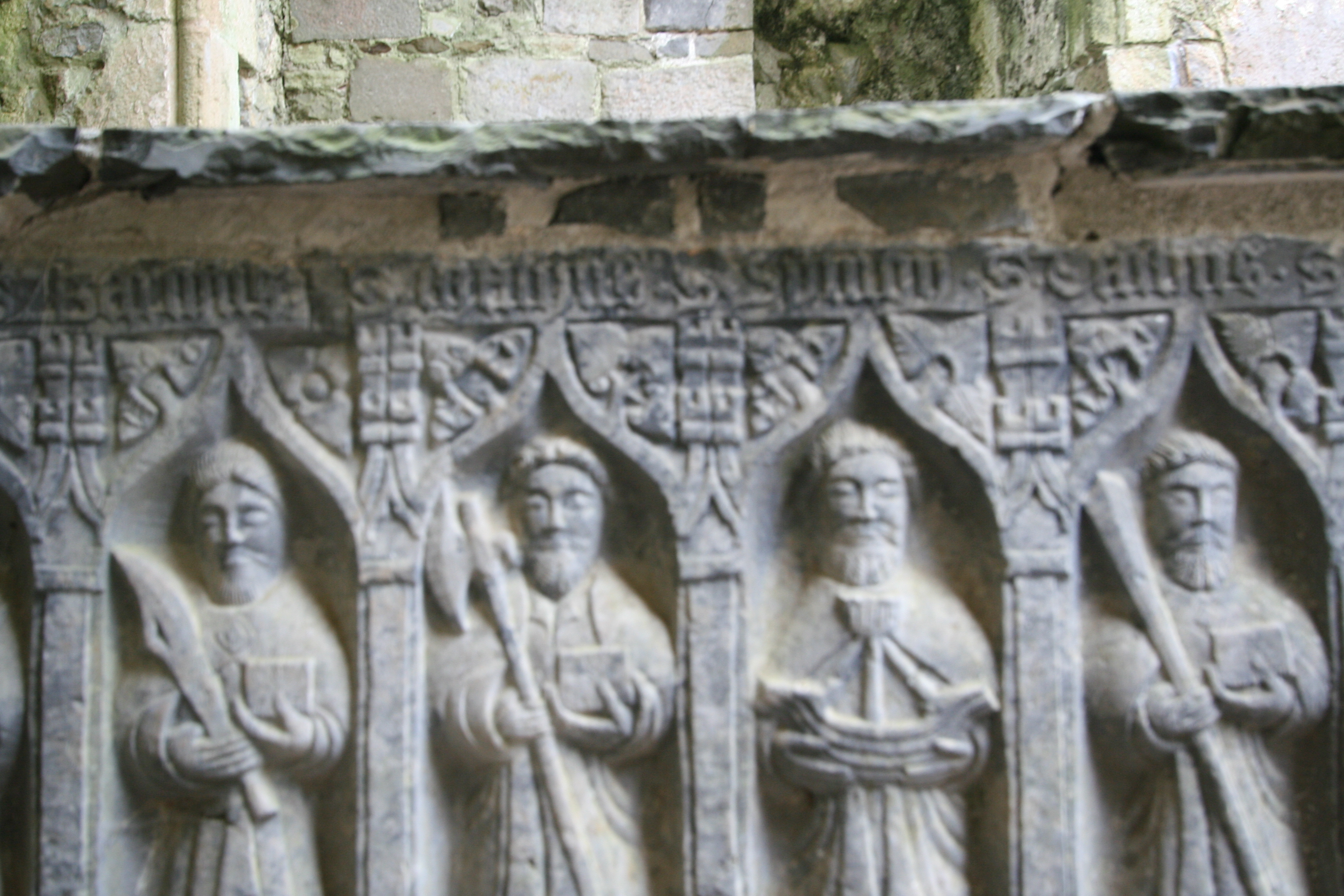
- Country: Ireland
- Founded: 5th century
- Founder: Conall Corc
- Current head: Owen Mac Owen Mc Donogh Mc Carthy Mor
- Titles: King of Cashel; King of Munster; (King of Tara); King of Iarmuman; King of Raithlin; King of Desmond; Prince of Carbery; Prince of Muskerry; Prince of Duhallow; Prince of Beara; Prince of Dunkerron; Prince of Locha Léin; Lord of Fermoy; (King of the Picts)

The Eóganachta (Modern Irish: Eoghanachta, pronounced [ˈoːnˠəxt̪ˠə]) were an Irish dynasty centred on Cashel which dominated southern Ireland (namely the Kingdom of Munster) from the 6/7th to the 10th centuries, and following that, in a restricted form, the Kingdom of Desmond, and its offshoot Carbery, to the late 16th century. By tradition the dynasty was founded by Conall Corc but named after his ancestor Éogan, the firstborn son of the semi-mythological 3rd-century king Ailill Aulom. This dynastic clan-name, for it was never in any sense a 'surname,' should more accurately be restricted to those branches of the royal house which descended from Conall Corc, who established Cashel as his royal seat in the late 5th century.

== High Kingship issue ==
Although the Eóganachta were powerful in Munster, they never provided Ireland with a High King. Serious challenges to the Uí Néill were however presented by Cathal mac Finguine and Feidlimid mac Cremthanin. They were not widely recognized as High Kings or Kings of Tara, as they did not belong to the Uí Néill, but they controlled territories as large or larger than those of the other dynasty. The kings of the Hill of Tara were sometimes called High Kings but were not recognized as kings of all Ireland in the historical period. However, this is to put the supposed position of "High King of Ireland" on a platform that it probably never enjoyed. The social structure of Gaelic Ireland was extremely complex, hierarchically oriented and aristocratic in concept. At the summit of society stood the king of a province, variously styled in the law texts as "King of great kings" (Irish: rí ruirech), "Chief of kings" (Irish: ollam ríg) and "The ultimate king of every individual" (Irish: rí bunaid cach cinn). From his justice there was no appeal, nor did the Brehon Law acknowledge the existence of the High Kingship of Ireland. The ri ruirech had no legal superior. In Munster this legal theory was explicitly adhered to by the annalists who styled the provincial kings as "High King" (Irish: ard rí), thereby stressing his absolute sovereignty. As the concept of the High Kingship of Ireland was developed from the 9th century onwards by the Uí Néill clan, the kings of Munster counterbalanced that historically inaccurate doctrine by stressing their alternative right to that title, or instead the enjoyment of full sovereignty in Leth Mogha, that part of Ireland south of a line from Dublin to Galway.

The Eóganacht king Fíngen mac Áedo Duib (Fingin son of Hugh Dubh) ruled as King of Munster (died 618) and is the direct male line ancestor of the O'Sullivans. His son Seachnasagh was too young to assume the throne and was therefore followed by Eóganacht king of Munster Faílbe Flann mac Áedo Duib, direct male line ancestor of the later MacCarthy kings. In the Roll of "The Kings of Munster", under the heading "Provincial Kings", we find that Fingin, son of Hugh Dubh, is No.14 on the Roll, while his brother Failbhe is No.16. Long, an anglicized version of the name Ó Longaidh, belongs to one of the oldest branches of the Eóghanchta royal dynasty of Ireland's Munster Province. Prince Longaidh, patriarch of the sept living in about 640, was a descendant of Oengus Mac Nad Fróich, the first Christian king of Munster in the 5th century who was said to have been baptized by Ss. Patrick and Ailbe on the Rock of Cashel. Early genealogical heritage survives in a poem attributed to the 7th century entitled Duan Cathain, preserved in An Leabhar Muimhneach. By the time of the Norman invasion in 1066, this Catholic clan was well established in its present territory in the Barony of Muskerry, County Cork, parishes of Canovee, Moviddy, Kilbonane, Kilmurry, and Dunisky straddling the River Lee. The MacCarthys owed the prominent position they held in Desmond at that period of the English invasion of Ireland, not to primogeniture, but to the disturbed state and chaos of Munster during the Danish wars, in which their immediate ancestors took a prominent and praiseworthy part.

== Gentle rulers ==
The rule of the Eóganachta in Munster is widely regarded as gentle and more sophisticated in comparison with the other provincial dynasties of Ireland. Not only was Munster the wealthiest of the provinces, but the Eóganachta were willing to concede other previously powerful kingdoms whom they had politically marginalized, such as the Corcu Loígde, considerable status and freedom from tribute, based on their former status as rulers of the province.

== Ancient origins ==
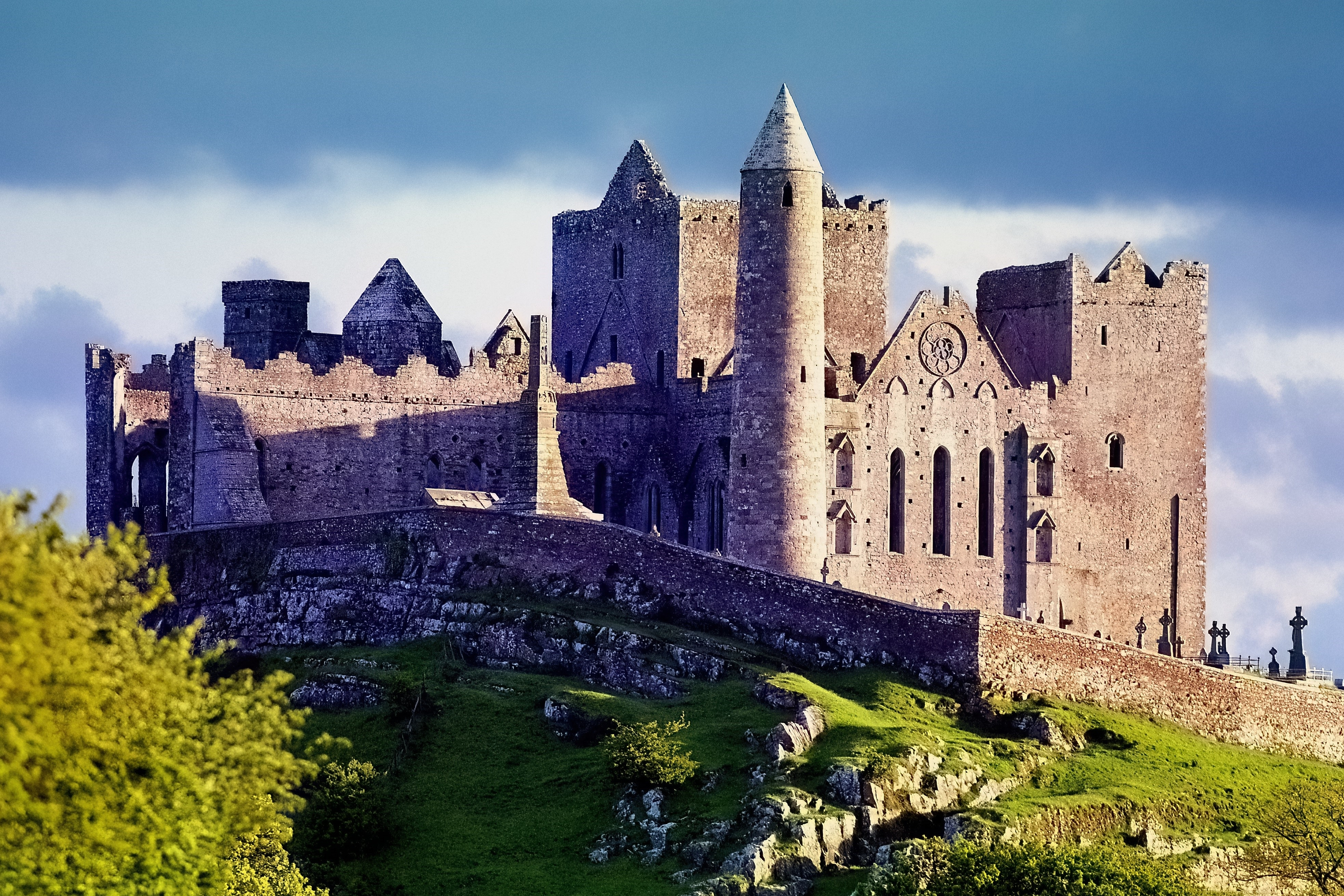
The Rock of Cashel pictured in the Summer of 1986.

Their origins, possibly Gaulish, are very obscure. According to one of their own origin legends (Laud 610), they were descendants of Heber, eldest son of King Milesius from the north of Spain (modern-day Galicia). The proto-Eóganachta, from the time of Mug Nuadat to the time of Crimthann mac Fidaig and Conall Corc, are sometimes referred to as the Deirgtine in early sources.

The earliest evidence for the proto-Eóganachta, the Deirgthine or Deirgtine, is in the form of ogham inscriptions. They appear to have initially been subjects of the Dáirine, a warlike people with frequently mentioned connections to Ulster, who were possibly cousins of the Ulaid. The Dáirine were represented in historical times most clearly by the Corcu Loígde, over whom the Deirgtine finally achieved supremacy during the 7th century, following the loss by the former of their centuries-long hold on the Kingdom of Osraige, apparently with some outside help from the Uí Néill.

The Eóganachta achieved their status primarily through political and economic sophistication and not military conquest. Ireland was dominated by several hostile powers whom they were never in any position to challenge militarily on their own, in the early centuries, but there also existed a number of subject tribes whom the Deirgtine successfully convinced to adopt them as their overlords. The effect was to separate the Dáirine, by now mainly the Corcu Loígde, from their cousin kingdoms and prominent subjects. The Eóganachta progressively surrounded themselves with favoured vassals such as the Múscraige, who would become the main source of their income as well as defense against the other kingdoms. The later famous Déisi Tuisceart, who would produce Brian Bóruma, were among these vassal peoples. The Déisi Muman of County Waterford may have shared Gaulish origins with the Eóganachta themselves.

Another powerful people of early Munster were the Mairtine, who had their capital at Emly or Imlech Ibair, first known as Medón Mairtine. It became the head church of the Eóganachta.

=== Mythology ===
See

- Aimend
- Áine
- Battle of Mag Mucrama
- Leath Mogha
- Lugaid mac Con
- Mór Muman
- Mug Ruith
- Nia Segamain
- Óengus Bolg
- Senchas Fagbála Caisil

== Royal houses, Septs and surnames ==
=== Early figures ===
A number of the figures below may be listed under the wrong septs. The quality of Eóganachta genealogical and historical writing greatly improves in the 2nd millennium under the MacCarthy overlords but some problems remain. The earliest historical rulers from the Eóganachta, descendants of Conall Corc, include:

- Mug Nuadat (Deirgtine)
- Ailill Aulomm
- Éogan Mór
- Fiachu Muillethan
- Ailill Flann Bec
- Luigthech
- Conall Corc (Eóganachta)
  - Nad Froích mac Cuirc (Inner Circle)
    - Óengus mac Nad Froích, d. 489
      - Feidlimid mac Óengusa
      - Eochaid mac Óengusa, d. 522
    - Ailill mac Nad Froích
  - Coirpre Luachra mac Cuirc (Uí Choirpri Lúachra)
  - Mac Cass mac Cuirc (Uí Echach Muman)

The princely houses of the Eóganachta may usefully be divided into the inner circle, the outer circle and extinct septs.

=== Princely houses: inner circle ===
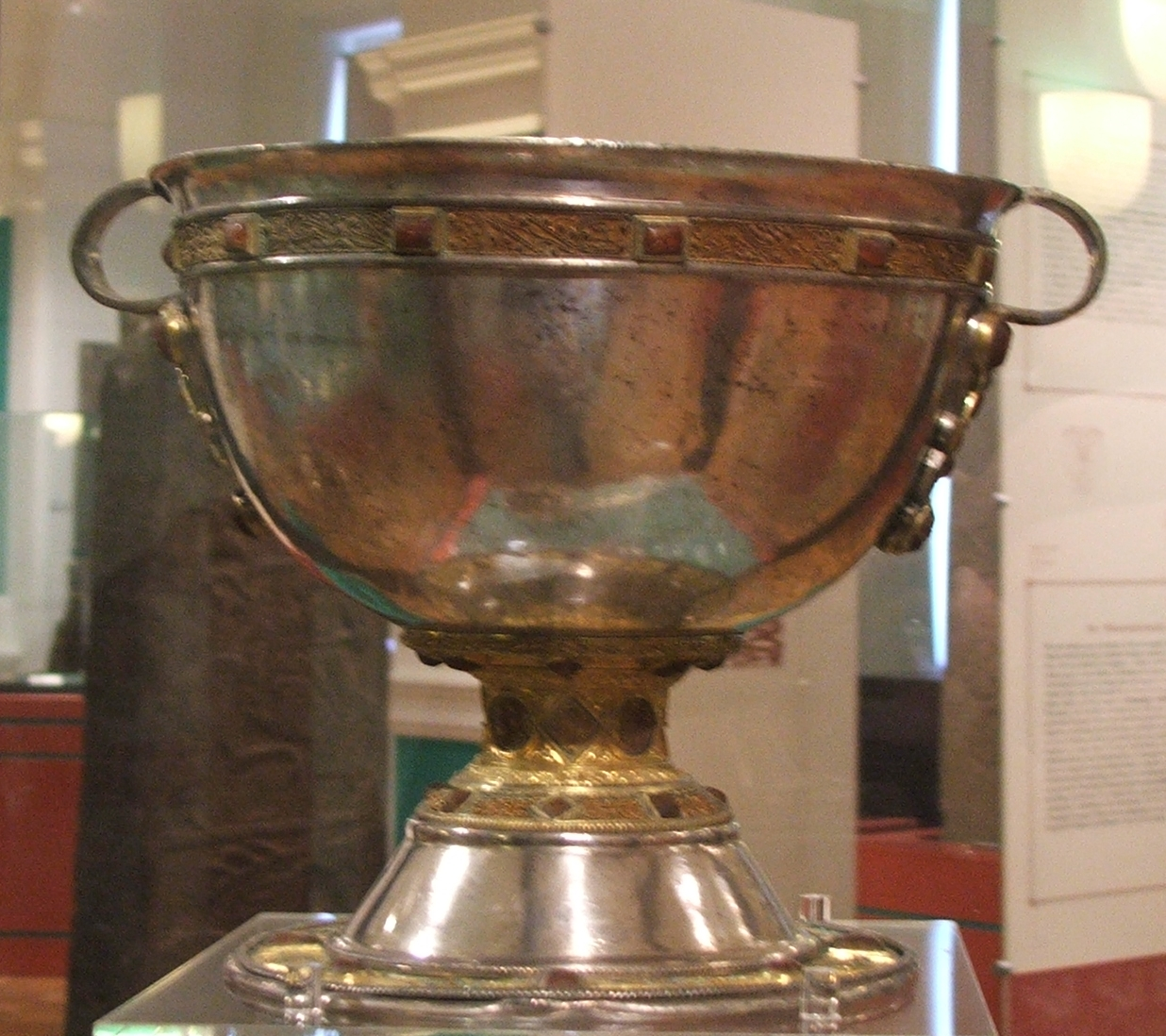
The Derrynaflan Chalice was found in County Tipperary in 1980.

- Eóganacht Chaisil
- Eóganacht Áine
- Eóganacht Glendamnach

These three princely houses produced nearly all Kings of Cashel from the 5th to the 10th centuries. Some were strong, others were renowned bishops and scholars, and others were weak. The importance of the Cashel kingship was primarily ceremonial, and rulers were with the occasional exception not militarily aggressive, although they continually strove for political dominance as far as they could with the province's wealth. Strong petty kingdoms regarded as subject would receive large payments called rath in return for their acknowledgment of the political supremacy of Cashel, and they would sometimes give hostages as well. The most powerful petty kingdoms exchanged hostages with the King of Cashel, and though subject in some sense (by agreement), they were legally free and capable of terminating the contract.

The Eóganacht Chaisil under the MacCarthys would later form the much more militarily capable but undermanned Kingdom of Desmond. The O'Sullivans, the eldest of the Eóganacht Chaisil, were the most powerful lords under them. The O'Keeffes of Eóganacht Glendamnach would later produce many great soldiers for Irish and Continental armies. The O'Callaghans were a smaller sept who have distinguished themselves in recent times, while the MacAuliffes and MacGillycuddys are, as stated, simply septs of the MacCarthys and O'Sullivans. The O'Kirbys of Eóganacht Áine were ruined by the Norman Invasion of Ireland.

- Eóganacht Chaisil of Cashel (O'Callaghan, MacCarthy, MacGillycuddy, MacAuliffe, O'Sullivan)
  - Carthage the Elder
  - Fíngen mac Áedo Duib, d. 618
  - Faílbe Flann mac Áedo Duib, d. 639
  - Máenach mac Fíngin, d. 661
  - Colgú mac Faílbe Flaind, d. 678
  - Cormac mac Ailello, d. 712
  - Tnúthgal mac Donngaile, d. 820
  - Feidlimid mac Cremthanin, d. 847
  - Áilgenán mac Donngaile, d. 853
  - Máel Gualae, d. 859
  - Cormac mac Cuilennáin, d. 908 (see also Sanas Cormaic, Cormac's Glossary)
  - Cellachán Caisil, d. 954
  - Donnchad mac Cellacháin, d. 963
- Eóganacht Glendamnach (O'Keeffe)
  - Crimthann Srem mac Echado, d. c. 542
  - Coirpre Cromm mac Crimthainn, d. 577
  - Cathal mac Áedo, d. 627
  - Cathal Cú-cen-máthair, d. 665
  - Finguine mac Cathail, d. 696
  - Ailill mac Cathail, d. 701
  - Cathal mac Finguine, d. 742
  - Artrí mac Cathail, d. 821
- Eóganacht Áine (O'Kirby, O'Kirwick/Kerwick)
  - Garbán mac Éndai
  - Amalgaid mac Éndai, d. 601
  - Cúán mac Amalgado, d. 641
  - Eterscél mac Máele Umai, d. 721
  - Cathussach mac Eterscélai, d. c. 769
  - Ólchobar mac Duib-Indrecht, d. 805
  - Ólchobar mac Cináeda, d. 851
  - Cenn Fáelad hua Mugthigirn, d. 872

=== Princely houses: outer circle ===
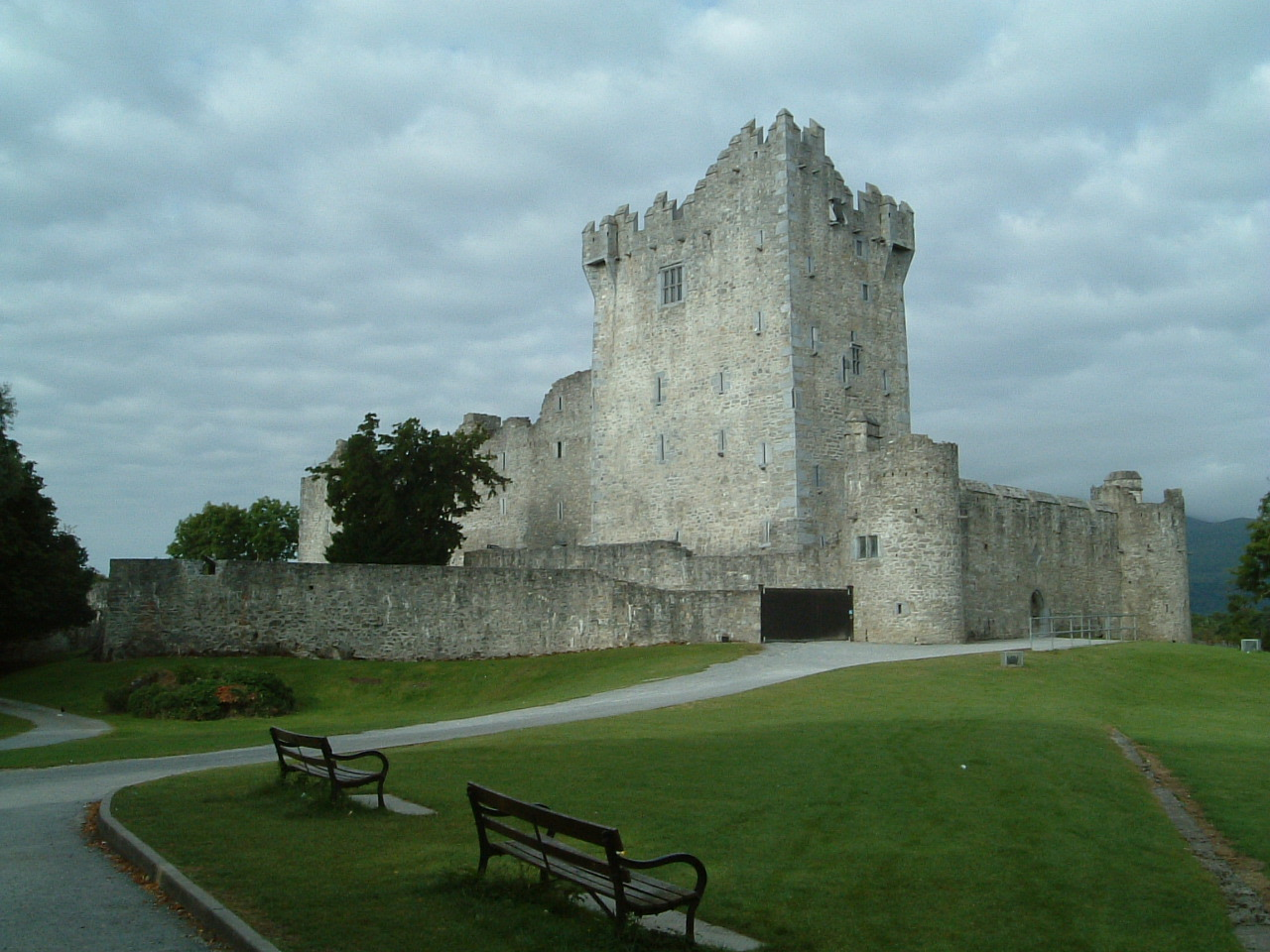
Ross Castle, fortress of the O'Donoghues, Lakes of Killarney, County Kerry.

- Eóganacht Locha Léin
- Eóganacht Raithlind

The two "outer" princely houses of the dynasty dwelt to the west and south of the central dynasties. Though descended from Conall Corc and thus theoretically entitled to hold the kingship, in effect these dynasties were excluded from Cashel politics, a situation which may or may not have been based on geographical realities. Powerful kings could become de facto Kings of Munster, but in general the central dynasties refused to recognize them as such, and this resulted in particular antagonism between Cashel and Eóganacht Locha Léin, the power of which was eventually broken. Eóganacht Raithlind was not as aggressive and so survived under O'Mahony rule well into the 2nd millennium. The O'Donoghues, originally from Eóganacht Raithlind, would move in to become the new princes of Eóganacht Locha Léin, and are still represented among the Irish nobles today by the Lord of Glenflesk (see below).

Oddly enough, the Eóganacht Raithlind, the Eóganacht Locha Léin, and the Uí Fidgenti-Liatháin (below), are all together referred to as the Three Eóganachta of Munster in early medieval story known as The Expulsion of the Déisi. This is strange in part because the first two were supposedly descended from Conall Corc and not Dáire Cerbba, but this grouping may be simply meant to illustrate that these were all free tribes in comparison with the rent-paying Déisi. Ongoing DNA analysis of the O'Connells of Kerry would seem to confirm an Eóghanacht origin, most closely related to the O'Donoghues (Eóghanacht Locha Léin), though they are in some sources assigned to the Uí Fidgenti-Liatháin. The Eóganacht Locha Léin were themselves often viewed by the "inner circle" with surprisingly vicious hostility, and this somehow involved a connection to the Picts of Scotland.

The occasional misguided attempts to "rank" these powerful septs "below" those of the inner circle, or even to exclude them from the Eóganachta entirely, can be rejected. See also Iarmuman.

- Eóganacht Locha Léin (O'Moriarity, and others, later O'Donoghue)
  - Dauí Iarlaithe mac Maithni
  - Áed Bennán mac Crimthainn, d. 618
  - Máel Dúin mac Áedo Bennán, d. 661
  - Congal mac Máele Dúin, d. 690
  - Máel Dúin mac Áedo, d. 786
- Eóganacht Raithlind (O'Mahony, O'Donoghue, O'Long, and many others)
  - Feidlimid mac Tigernaig, d. 588
  - Máel Muad mac Brain, d. 978 (see also Mathgamain mac Cennétig)

=== Extinct septs ===
There are several extinct and/or unconfirmed septs:

- Eóganacht Airthir Cliach (extinct)
  - Ferghus Scannal, d. 582
- Eóganacht Ninussa
- Éoganacht Ua Cathbach

=== Surnames and clan names ===
Eóganachta dynastic surnames include O'Callaghan, MacCarthy, O’Hurley, Hurley, O'Donoghue, MacGillycuddy, O'Keeffe, O'Moriarity, O'Sullivan, among others, many of them of contested origin. MacAuliffe is typically a MacCarthy (Cremin) sept. MacGillycuddy is an O'Sullivan (Mor) sept. O'Long is classed as Eóganacht (Raithlind). O'Driscoll is Corcu Loígde (Dáirine) but the family are related to the Eóganachta through early and late marriages and so qualify as natural kin. O'Leary can be either Corcu Loígde or Uí Fidgenti or Eóganacht depending on the sept. O'Carroll of Éile may or may not be distantly related to the Eóganachta. Scannell was also a sept of some significance and it is recorded that in 1014, Eocha, son of Dunadbach, Chief of Clann Scannail, and Scannail son of Cathal, Lord of Eóganacht Locha Léin, were killed at the Battle of Clontarf.

Out of the approximately 150 surviving Irish surnames of princely or comital origins, the Eóganachta and their allies account for approximately 30, or about one fifth. Unfortunately their pedigrees are often hopelessly disorganized and confused and so it is difficult or impossible to tell in many cases which people belong to which septs, or in fact if they even belong to the Eóganachta at all. There is also great evidence in the pedigrees and regnal lists of repeated modification, outright fabrication, and unceremonious deletion, at least for the early period (all concerned sources), with some criticisms quite severe, although this is also a problem with Connachta and Laigin material.

== Eóganachta Kings of Munster ==
Eóganachta Kings of Munster

Conall Corc a quo Eóganachta
-453; Nad Froích	Mac Cass a quo Eóganacht Raithlind	Coirpre Luachra a quo Eóganacht Locha Léin
453–489; Óengus	Ailill a quo Eóganacht Áine	Echu a quo Uí Echach Muman	Maithne
Bressal	500-522; Eochaid	489–500; Feidilmid a quo Eóganacht Chaisil	Crimthann	Crimthann	Dauí Iarlaithe
Eochaid	Crimthann Airthir Cliach a quo Eóganacht Airthir Cliach	522–542; Crimthann Srem Feimin a quo Eóganacht Glendamnach	Crimthann	Éndae a quo Uí Énda	Lóegaire a quo Uí Láegairi	Áed Ualgarb a quo Cenél nÁeda	Cobthach
Furudrán	Cormac Sriadberg	577–582; Ferghus Scannal	542–577; Coirpre Cromm	Áed Dub	596–601; Garbán	596–601; Amalgaid	Áed Osraige	Tigernach	Crimthann
Dub Indrecht	Crundmáel	Áed Fland Cathrach	577–596; Feidlimid	601-618; Fingen	627–639; Failbe Fland	639–641; Cuán	Coirpre Riastrain	582-588; Feidlimid	618-618; Áed Bennán
Dúnchad	Cellach	618–627; Cathal	Sechnussach	641-661; Máenach	665–678; Colgú	Máel Umai	Clárenech	Cenn Fáelad	Cummíne
Colmán	Mugthigern	661–665; Cathal Cú-cen-máthair	Rechtabra	Colmán	Ailill	Nad Fraích	712–721; Eterscél	Uisnech	Selbach	Fergus	Conaing
Eochaid	Murchad	678–696; Finguine	696-701; Ailill	Flann	Dub-dá-Crich	701–712; Cormac	Fáelgus	Snédgus	742–769; Cathussach	Cathussach	Éladach	Bécc a quo Cenél mBécce	Áed
Ailgile	859–872; Cenn Fáelad hua Mugthigirn	721–742; Cathal	Indrechtach	Crimthann	Dúngalach	Conall a quo Cenél Conaill	Dub Indrecht	Dúnlaing	Fer-dá-Lethe	769–786; Máel Dúin
Selbach	805–820; Artrí	Móenach	820–847; Feidlimid	Donngus	Snédgus	Crundmáel	Domnall	786–805; Ólchobar mac Duib-Indrecht	Ánilte	Artgal	Congal
Cuilennán	Tuathal	Bran	807–820; Tnúthgal	Artgal	Dub-dá-Bairenn	Artgal	Flaithnia	Connath	Cináed
902–908; Cormac	Máel Fathardaig	Donngal	Lachtnae	Láegaire	872–888; Dúnchad	Corcc	Óengus	Ailill Broga	847–851; Ólchobar
Donnchad	851–853; Áilgenán	853–859; Máel Gualae	Buadachán	895–902; Finguine Cenn nGécán	Corcrán	Dub-dá-Bairenn	Cú Chongelt
Flann	Clérech	888–895; Dub Lachtna	–954; Cellachán Caisil	Corcrán	Domnall	Conchobar
954–957; Máel Fathardaig	959–961; Fer Gráid	Donnchadh	Condlígán	957–959; Dub Dá Bairenn	Cathnia
1014–1025; Dúngal Hua Donnchada	Saorbhreathach	944- Lorcán	Spelán
Cárthach a quo Mac Cárthaigh	Cian
Muireadach	Bran
1127–1138; Cormac	959–970; 976–978; Máel Muad

== Other kingdoms ==
=== In Ireland ===
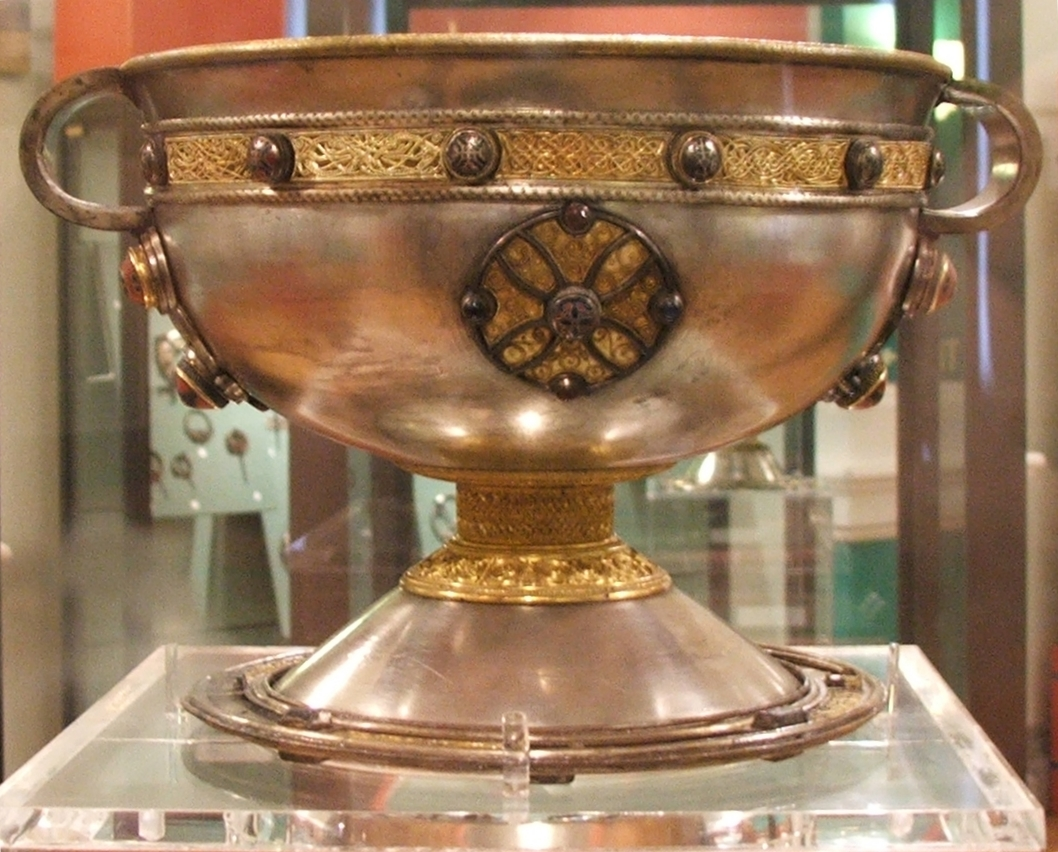
The Ardagh Chalice was discovered in County Limerick, at Reerasta Rath in Uí Fidgenti, 1868.

Sometimes also included are the Uí Fidgenti (O'Donovan, O'Collins, O'Flannery, Lyons, among others.) and the related Uí Liatháin (Lyons, Gleeson, others), ancient allies of the Eóganachta who may have originally belonged to the Dáirine, although it is also possible they were earlier or peripheral branches of the descendants of Ailill Flann Bec, or of Ailill Aulomm, not involved in the innovative Cashel politics of the descendants of Conall Corc, actual founder of the Eóganachta dynasties. In this way, the children of Fidach, the early monarch Crimthand Mór mac Fidaig and his sister Mongfind, also belong to the peripheral Eóganachta. But only the descendants of Conall Corc, son of Luigdech or Lugaid, son of Ailill Flann Bec, could claim Cashel, whereas all three of these more distantly related aristocracies appear to descend from Dáire Cerbba and/or Maine Munchaín, so-called brother(s) of Lugaid. In any case, both the Uí Fidgenti and Uí Liatháin were apparently fading, for whatever reasons, while the Eóganachta were in their prime. They paid no obvious tribute but were little involved in the political scene after a period, the terms of the alliance being only that they were expected to support the Eóganachta militarily on "honour related" expeditions outside Munster or in the defence of it. The Uí Fidgenti did exchange hostages with the King of Cashel, just like the Eóganacht Raithlind and Eóganacht Locha Léin were honoured, and so they appear to have been viewed as kin from an early period, even if they may have been Dáirine to begin with or included very substantial elements. In the earliest genealogies, mostly found in Rawlinson B 502, they are in some way kin to the Eóganachta, even if only through marriage at first as suggested by some later interpreters.

According to Rawlinson B 502, Dáire Cerbba was born in Brega, County Meath, but no explanation is given. This might mean his family were even later arrivals to Munster than the Eóganachta and help explain their lack of centralization and well known colonies in Britain. The Uí Fidgenti (NW) and Uí Liatháin (SE) were in opposing corners of Munster with the Eóganacht Áine and Eóganacht Glendamnach more or less in between, as well as the Fir Mag Fene. Brega bordered on the territory of the Laigin, and was originally a part of it. Against this is the fact that the Uí Fidgenti had their own capital at Dún Eochair in Munster, constructed by the Dáirine several centuries before the rise of Cashel, as described by Geoffrey Keating.

=== In Scotland ===
It has been suggested that the Kings of the Picts were derived from a sept of the Eóganachta. If so, then the Eóganacht Locha Léin, and thus the ancestors of the O'Moriartys and others, are the most obvious candidates. Not only were they at one point expansive as the powerful Kingdom of Iarmuman, but they were also frustrated by their exclusion and forced isolation by the inner circle. The inner circle exhibited peculiar attitudes from time to time and so this could have been the real story.

- Eóganacht Maige Geirginn. The plain of Circinn is thought to be the area of Angus and the Mearns in Scotland.
  - Óengus I of the Picts, d. 761
  - Bridei V of the Picts
  - Talorgan II of the Picts, d. 782
  - Drest VIII of the Picts
  - Constantín mac Fergusa, d. 820
  - Óengus II of the Picts, d. 834
  - Drest IX of the Picts, d. 836 or 837
  - Eóganan mac Óengusa, d. 839

== History ==
=== Competition with the Uí Néill ===
See Byrne (2001), Cathal mac Finguine, Feidlimid mac Cremthanin, Synod of Birr.

=== Competition with the Dál gCais ===
In some later traditions of Thomond, Eógan had a younger brother, Cas, who is said to have originated the rival Dál gCais dynasty of Ireland. The smaller Dál gCais kingdom proved to have surprising military might, and displaced the increasingly beset Eóganachta, who were suffering also from attacks by the Vikings and the Uí Néill, on the Munster throne during the course of the 10th century. From this the Eóganachta and their allies would never fully recover, but they did continue, largely in the form of the MacCarthys and O'Sullivans, to assert their authority and rule large parts of Desmond for the next six centuries. They would badly rout the FitzGeralds at the Battle of Callann, halting the advance of the Normans into Desmond, and win back many territories briefly held by them. See Byrne (2001), Todd (1867), Brian Bóruma, Mathgamain mac Cennétig, Cennétig mac Lorcáin, Kings of Munster, Kings of Desmond, Thomond, County Clare, Déisi.

=== The Cambro-Normans and England ===
See FitzGerald, Battle of Callann, Earl of Desmond, Desmond Rebellions, Second Desmond Rebellion, Florence MacCarthy, Tudor conquest of Ireland, Dónall Cam Ó Súilleabháin Béirre, Siege of Dunboy, Plantations of Ireland, Irish Confederate Wars, Donagh MacCarthy, Viscount Muskerry, Earl of Clancarty.

=== Ecclesiastical relations with Germany ===
See Byrne (2001).

=== Marriages and pedigrees ===
See O'Hart (1892), Cronnelly (1864), Burke (1976), D'Alton (1861), O'Donovan (1856), O'Keeffe (1703), Byrne (2001).

== Later figures ==
- Charles MacCarthy (Irish soldier)
- Robert MacCarty, Viscount Muskerry
- Charles MacCarthy (governor)

Other notable people are:

- Thaddeus MacCarthy,
- Nicholas Tuite MacCarthy
- Eoghan Rua Ó Súilleabháin

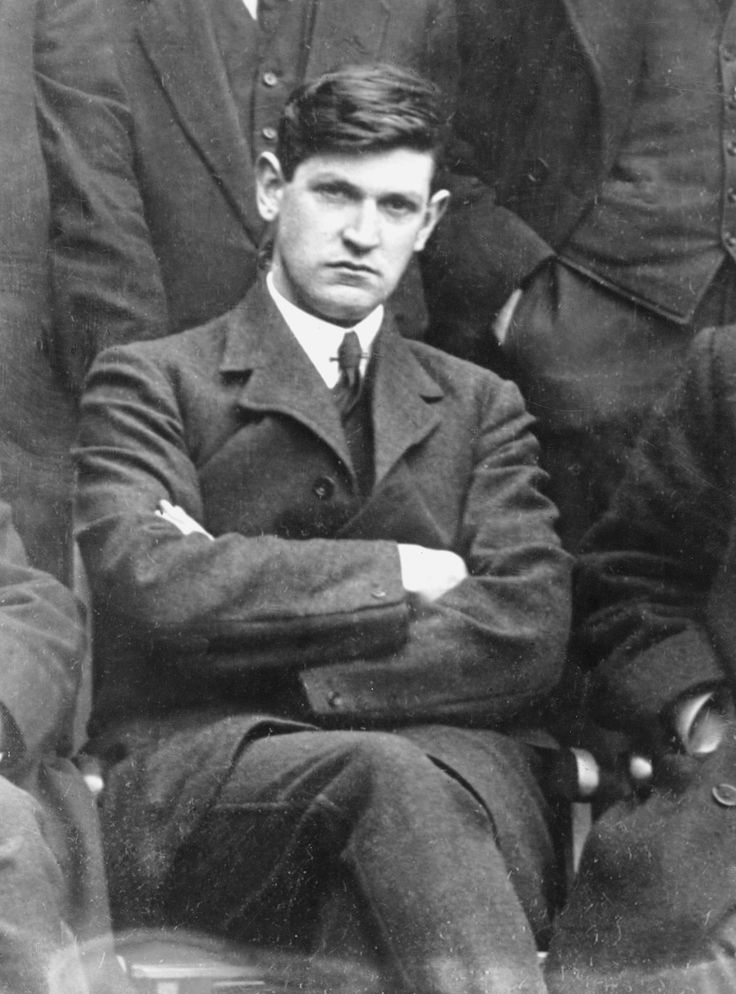
Mícheál Ó Coileáin 1919.

For the 20th century, the long hidden Ó Coileáins of Uí Conaill Gabhra, once the most dominant sept of the Uí Fidgenti, produced the famous Mícheál Ó Coileáin. His sept were driven out of County Limerick in the 13th century by the FitzGeralds, but still regarded themselves as dispossessed aristocracy. The Ó Coileáins had joined their cousins the O'Donovans in County Cork, who themselves had been assisted by their friends the O'Mahonys. The MacCarthy Reaghs would soon follow to become the princes of the area, or Barony of Carbery, and later both they and the O'Mahonys would send septs to be accepted among the aristocracy in France. Of the four, only the O'Donovans, keeping a low profile, remained Gaelic lords after a time.

The MacCarthy of Muskerry dynasty are of great importance and there are several surviving septs.

Daniel "The Liberator" O'Connell has been said to have belonged to a small sept of the Uí Fidgenti who found themselves in County Kerry.

Another lively figure was Pierce Charles de Lacy O'Mahony.

Modern Eóganacht

Curley gives profiles of some twenty current Irish lords, several of them Eóganacht or allied, enjoying varying levels of recognition.

- O'Donoghue of the Glens (Eóganacht Locha Léin, first Eóganacht Raithlind)
- McGillycuddy of the Reeks (O'Sullivan Mor: Eóganacht Chaisil)
- O'Callaghan of Duhallow (Eóganacht Chaisil)
- O'Donovan of Clancahill (Uí Fidgenti)

The scandal created by Terence Francis MacCarthy has left their futures uncertain. He inserted himself into the pedigree of the Sliocht Cormaic of Dunguile, the senior surviving sept of the MacCarthy dynasty, who still await recognition from the Irish government following the scandal.

== See also ==
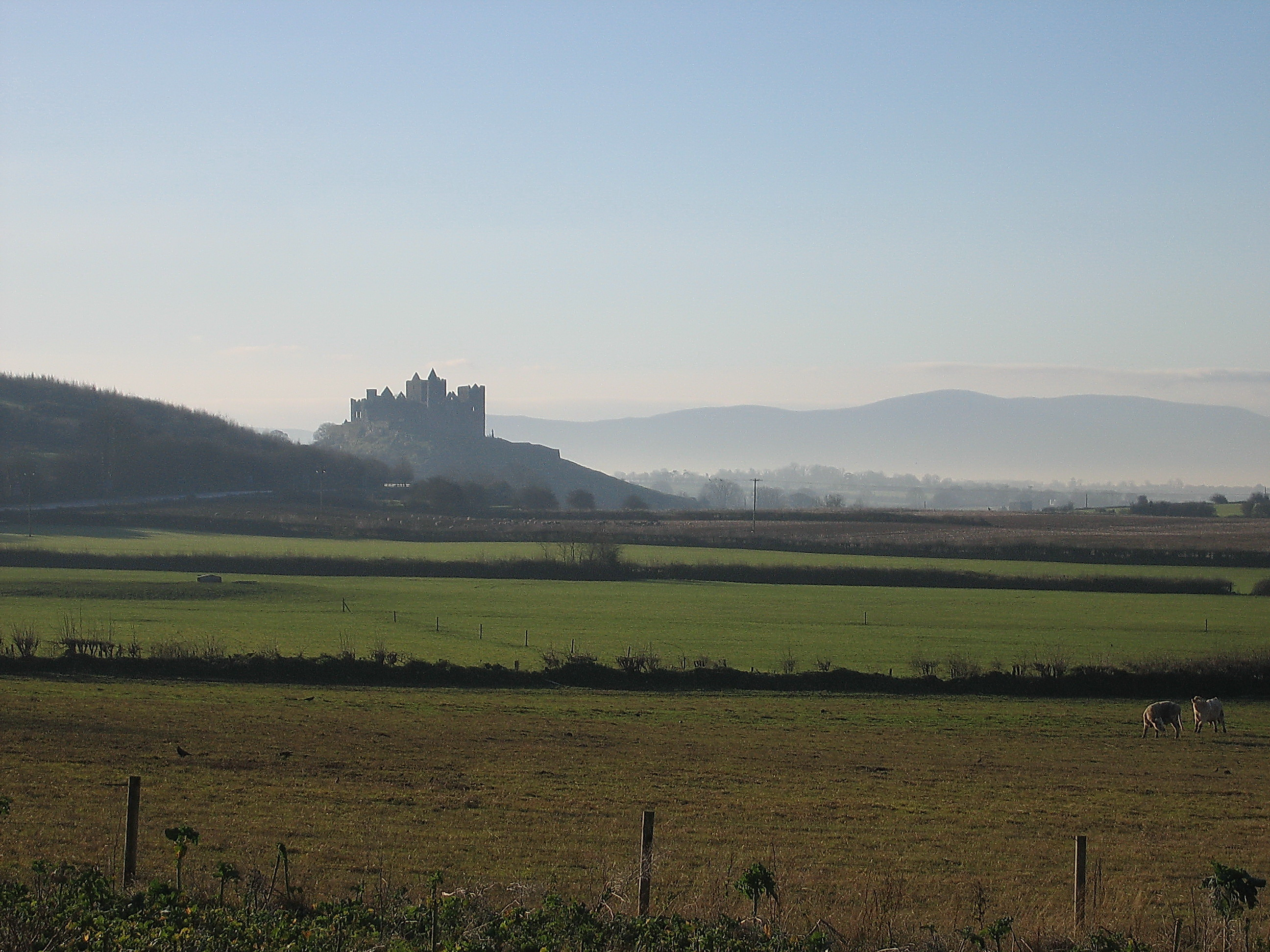
The Rock of Cashel.

- Kingdoms of Ireland
- Kings of Munster
- Kings of Desmond
- Mac Carthaigh's Book
- Counts of Toulouse
- Earl of Clancarty
- Irish nobility
- Family of Barrau
- Irish royal families
- Chief of the Name
- Terence Francis MacCarthy
