= Eóganacht Glendamnach =

Historical branch of Irish royal dynasty

Eóganacht Glendamnach were a branch of the Eóganachta, the ruling dynasty of Munster during the 5th-10th centuries. They took their name from Glendamnach (Glanworth, County Cork). They were descended from Óengus mac Nad Froích (died 489), the first Christian King of Munster through his son Eochaid mac Óengusa (died 522) and grandson Crimthann Srem mac Echado (died c. 542). Kings of Cashel and Munster from the Eóganacht Glendamnach were:

- Coirpre Cromm mac Crimthainn, d. 577
- Cathal mac Áedo, d. 627
- Cathal Cú-cen-máthair, d. 665
- Finguine mac Cathail, d. 696
- Ailill mac Cathail, d. 701
- Cathal mac Finguine, d. 742
- Artrí mac Cathail, d. 821

King lists for the 6th century give a virtual monopoly to the Glendamnach branch. Those found in the Laud Synchronisms were probably written for the benefit of Eóganacht Glendamnach; they may have been written at Cloyne in the mid 8th century, a monastery favourable to the Glendamnach branch. The Eóganacht Glendanmach were considered part of the 'inner circle' of Eóganachta dynasties which included the Eóganacht Chaisil and Eóganacht Áine. These three branches rotated the kingship of Munster in the 7th and much of the 8th centuries. This dynasty reached its apex in the eighth century, under Cathal mac Finguine. The last king from this branch, Artrí mac Cathail, died in 821. Their later ruling sept were the Ó Caoimh (O'Keeffes) and Uí Cochláin (Coughlan).
