= Ailill mac Cathail =

Ailill mac Cathail Con-cen-máthair (died 701) was a King of Munster from the Glendamnach branch of the Eóganachta. He was the son of Cathal Cú-cen-máthair mac Cathail (d. 665) and brother of his predecessor Finguine mac Cathail Con-cen-máthair (d. 696).

Though mentioned in the annals as king and in the saga Senchas Fagbála Caisil "The Story of the Finding of Cashel", he is omitted from lists in the Laud Synchronisms and the Book of Leinster. Also in the list of signatories to the signing of Adomnan's Law of the Innocents at Birr in 697; he is only mentioned as king of Mag Feimin while Eterscél mac Máele Umai (d. 721) is named king of Munster.

Ailil had three sons: Fogantach, Aonghus and Dubhda but none of his descendants were kings.

== See also ==
- Kings of Munster
