= Tnúthgal mac Artrach =

Tnúthgal mac Artrach (died c. 807) or Tuathal mac Artroig was a supposed King of Munster from the Glendamnach branch of the Eóganachta. He was the son of Artrí mac Cathail (died 821), also King of Munster.

Mentioned in some king lists, it is possible that his father ordained him as king to rule with him during his reign. He is not mentioned in the Irish annals.
