= Iarmuman =

Iarmhumhain Iarluachair
- 5th century – 9th century
- Status: Sub-kingdom of Munster
- Capital: Loch Léin (near modern-day Killarney)
- Common languages: Old Irish
- Religion: Christianity
- Government: Monarchy
- Historical era: Early Christian Ireland

Iarmhumhain (older spellings: Iarmuman, Iarmumu or Iarluachair) was a Kingdom in the early Christian period of Ireland in west Munster. Its ruling dynasty was related to the main ruling dynasty of Munster known as the Eóganachta. Its ruling branch was called the Eóganacht Locha Léin or Ui Chairpri Lúachra. Their center was around Killarney, County Kerry at Loch Léin. The name Iarluachair means west of the Sliabh Luachra mountains.

The dynasty was established in the 5th century with the kingdom becoming semi-independent of the Munster kings at Cashel in the 6th century. They ruled over smaller kingdoms in west Munster such as the Ciarraige Luachra, Corcu Duibne and Corcu Loígde and at the height of their power may have ruled over areas of west Thomond including the Corcu Baiscinn and Corco Mruad and perhaps even had some sovereignty over the Uí Fidgenti of County Limerick and the Eóganacht Raithlind of County Cork.

Their power was broken in the late 8th and early 9th centuries. The transference of the overlordship of the Ciarraige Luachra to direct Cashel control in the reign of Feidlimid mac Cremthanin (died 846) signified this. The last time the title King of Iarmuman was used in the Annals of Innisfallen was 791 and in the Annals of Ulster 833. The dynasty then begins to use the title king of Loch Léin.

== Kings of Iarmuman ==
- Coirpre Luachra mac Cuirc (mid 5th century)
- Maine mac Coirpri
- Dauí Iarlaithe mac Maithni (circa 500)
- Cobthach mac Dauí Iarlaithe
- Crimthann mac Cobthaig (6th century)
- Áed Bennán mac Crimthainn (died 618)
- Áed Dammán mac Crimthainn (died 633)
- Máel Dúin mac Áedo Bennán (died 661)
- Congal mac Máele Dúin (died 690)
- AI700.1 Kl. Death of Mael Bracha, king of IarMumu. (see Annals of Inisfallen)
- Cú Dínaisc mac Foirchellaig (died 717)
- Áed mac Conaing (died 734)
- Cairpre mac Con Dínaisc (died 747)
- Máel Dúin mac Áedo (died 786)
- Cú Chongelt mac Cairpri (died 791)
- Áed Allán mac Coirpri (died 803)
- Cobthach mac Máele Dúin (died 833)
- Máel Crón mac Cobthaig (died 838)
