= Fedelmid mac Crimthainn =

- King of Munster
- Reign: 820-846
- Predecessor: Tnúthgal mac Donngaile
- Successor: Ólchobar mac Cináeda
- Died: 847

Fedelmid mac Crimthainn was the King of Munster between 820 and 846. He was numbered as a member of the Céli Dé, an abbot of Cork Abbey and Clonfert Abbey, and possibly a bishop.

== Early Kingship ==
Fedelmid was of the Cenél Fíngin sept of the Eóganacht Chaisil branch of the Eóganachta, and he is noted as having assumed the sovereignty of Munster in 820. In 823, in co-operation with Bishop Artrí mac Conchobar of Armagh, he had the "Law of St. Patrick" established in Munster, and sacked the monastery, that of Gailline of the Britons, in modern County Offaly. The Dealbhna Breatha was burnt by Fedelmid in 825. In 827, there was the first of a number of royal meetings between Fedelmid and Conchobar mac Donnchada, of the Southern Uí Néill, King of Tara or High King of Ireland.

In 830, Fedelmid was back burning monasteries—this time it was probably that of Fore Abbey in modern County Westmeath, while in Southern Galway, he destroyed the Uí Briúin, and in the same year, the Munstermen were recorded as killing Folloman, son of Donnchad, brother of Conchobhar, the High King of Ireland. In 831 and 832, he is recorded as taking an army of Leinster and Munster into East Meath, plundering as far north as Slane, while also raiding the Dealbhna Beatha of southern Offaly three times, and burning Clonmacnoise. In 833, he is back in Clonmacnoise burning it and the Clann Cholmáin monastery of Durrow to the doors of their churches. In 835, the Munstermen are recorded as having slain Fergus, son of Bodbchad, the King of Carraic-Brachaidhe, from the very north-west of the country, in Inishowen.

== High point of his rule ==
In 836, Fedelmid took the oratory in Kildare against Forindam, the abbot of Armagh, and had him and the congregation of Patrick imprisoned. In 837, Fedelmid is recorded as taking the abbacy of Cork, and also plundering the Cenél Cairpri Cruim. In 838, there was a great royal meeting in Cluain-Conaire-Tommain (north modern Kildare) between Fedelmid and Niall Caille mac Áeda, the King of the Northern Uí Néill, as a result of which the Annals of Inisfallen, presumably relying on Munster tradition, report that Fedelmid became full king of Ireland that day and occupied the abbot's chair of Clonfert.

The year 840 was probably the high point of Fedelmid's rule, when he ravaged the east midland kingdoms of Mide and Brega and is recorded as having rested in Temhar (Tara), and the annals have a short poem on this:

Feidhlimid is the King,
To whom it was but one day’s work
[To obtain] the pledges of Connaught without battle,
And to devastate Midhe.

== Downfall and death ==
However, this triumph was short-lived and, in 841, he was defeated in battle by Niall Caille at Magh-Ochtar in Kildare, presumably by surprise, as the following verse suggests:

The crozier of the devout Feidlimid,
Was abandoned in the blackthorns,
Niall, mighty in combat, took it,
By right of victory in battle with swords.

Fedelmid does not appear to have recovered from this defeat and died in 847. Although the cause of his death is not noted in the Annals of Ulster, the majority of the other sources place the cause of his death on St. Kieran, the patron saint of Clonmacnoise, as revenge for Fedelmid's plundering of the site. The Annals of Clonmacnoise offer the following description:

After his returne to Munster ye next year, he was overtaken by a great disease of the flux of the belly, which happened in this wide. As King felym (soone after his return to Mounster) was taking his rest inn his bed, St. Wueran appeared to him with his habit and bachall.. & there gave him a push of his Bachall in his belly whereof he tooke his disease and occasiontion of Death, and notwithstanding his great irregularity and great desire of spoyle he was of sum numbered among the scribes and anchorites of Ireland.

== Annalistic references ==
- AI838.1 A great assembly of the men of Ireland in Cluain Ferta Brénainn, and Niall son of Aed, king of Temuir, submitted to Feidlimid, son of Crimthann, so that Feidlimid became full king of Ireland that day, and he occupied the abbot's chair of Cluain Ferta.
- AI840.1 Kl. Feidlimid harried Leth Cuinn from Birra to Temuir, and he was checked at Temuir, and he seized Gormlaith, daughter of Murchad, king of Laigin, together with her female train, and Indrechtach, son of Mael Dúin, was killed by him at Temuir.
- AI847.1 Kl. The seventh feria [Saturday], tenth of the moon. Feidlimid, son of Crimthann, fell asleep.

== See also ==
- List of royal saints and martyrs

== Notes ==
Fedelmid mac Crimthainn Eóganachta
Regnal titles
Preceded by Tnúthgal mac Donngaile	King of Munster c. 820 – 847	Succeeded by Ólchobar mac Cináeda
