= Eóganacht Locha Léin =

Eóganacht Locha Léin or Uí Cairpre Luachra were a branch of the ruling Eóganachta of Munster. Their territory was in Iarmuman or West Munster. Luachair (Lúachra) is the old name of a large district on the borders of Co Cork, Kerry and Limerick. Cairbre of Sliobh Luachra was on the Cork-Kerry border; Eóganacht Locha Léin is around the Lakes of Killarney.

The ancestor of this branch was Cairpre Luachra mac Cuirc, son of Corc mac Luigthig (or Conall Corc mac Lugdach, the founder of Cashel) by Mungfionn daughter of Feredach, King of the Picts of Scotland. Cairpre Luachra was a sixth generation descendant of Éogan Mór, ancestor of the Eoganachta. Cairpre went west over Luachair Deadhaid (Slieveloughra) to found the lands of his dynasty

Ruling septs of Eóganacht Locha Léin included Úa Cathail, Úa Flainn, Úa Muircheartaigh or Moriarty, and Úa Cerbaill. By the 12th century the Úa Donnchadha (O'Donoghues, Cenél Laegaire of Eóganacht Raithlind), leaving Eóganacht Raithlind of Cork, had conquered and settled Éoganacht Locha Léin.

The Loch Léin branch had a free client relationship with the kings of Cashel and were often called kings of Íarlúachair or kings of Locha Léin in the annals. The Locha Léin branch rarely provided kings of Cashel and were not part of the 'inner circle' of Eóganachta which was made up of the Eóganachta of Aurmumu. The 'inner circle' consisted of Eóganacht Glendamnach, Eóganacht Chaisil, and Eóganacht Áine. Eóganacht Locha Léin seem to have had a tumultuous relationship with the dynasties to their east.

Several kings from Eóganacht Locha Léin are thought to have been kings of Cashel, these included:

- Dauí Iarlaithe mac Maithni (c.500)
- Áed Bennán mac Crimthainn, died 618
- Máel Dúin mac Áedo, died 786
- Ólchobar mac Cináeda, died 851 (may have belonged to Áine)

Loch Léin were prominent in the second half of the eighth century. Máel Dúin mac Áedo broke the monopolisation of the Cashel kingship by the Aurmumu septs. After this, the sept fell into decline. The West Munster Synod, which was written in the late eighth century, or early ninth, demonstrates attempts by the Ciarraige to check Locha Léin power. The Ciarraige were said to have killed a Locha Léin dynast in 803. In 833, the death of Cobthach son of Máel Dúin is recorded. He is only called 'king of Loch Léin' in the Annals, suggesting that the power of Locha Léin had waned. From this point, the Annals stop recording the obits of their kings. This suggests that they had become somewhat unimportant.

== See also ==
- Eóganachta
- Kings of Munster
