= Eóganacht Áine =

Eóganacht Áine or Eóganacht Áine Cliach was a princely house of the Eóganachta, dynasty of Munster during the 5th–12th centuries. They took their name from the Hill of Áine (Irish: Cnoc Áine) near the present day village of Knockainy, County Limerick. This region (Irish: tuatha) of Cliú is centred on the historical barony of Smallcounty in eastern Limerick. The nearby village of Emly was the ecclesiastical center of Munster at the time.

The clan was descended from Ailill mac Nad Froích, the brother of Óengus mac Nad Froích (died 489), the first Christian King of Munster. The Eóganacht Áine were considered part of the 'inner circle' of Eóganachta dynasties. This also included the Eóganacht Chaisil and Eóganacht Glendamnach branches. These three branches were based in Aurmumu (Eastern Munster) around the Galtee Mountains, and the three branches rotated the kingship of Munster in the 7th and much of the 8th centuries. This rotation was broken by Máel Dúin mac Áedo of Eoganacht Locha Léin.

The main clan in the 7th and 8th centuries were known as the Ua nÉnna, descended from Énda mac Crimthainn, the grandson of Ailill. One of the last Kings of Munster from this house was Cenn Fáelad hua Mugthigirn. By the 12th century, the ruling house was the Ó Ciarmhaic or O'Kirwick/Kerwick and Kirby. They were ruined by the Norman invasion of Ireland.
