= 8th century in Ireland =

Events from the 8th century in Ireland.

== 700s ==
701

- Death of Niall mac Cernaig Sotal, a king in southern Brega of the Uí Chernaig sept of Lagore of the Síl nÁedo Sláine. He was the grandson of the high king Diarmait mac Áedo Sláine (died 665).

702

- Death of Írgalach mac Conaing, also called Írgalach ua Conaing, was a King of Brega from the Uí Chonaing sept of Cnogba (Knowth) of the Síl nÁedo Sláine branch of the southern Uí Néill. He was the son of Conaing Cuirre mac Congaile (died 661) and brother of Congalach mac Conaing Cuirre (died 696), previous kings of Brega. He ruled from 696 to 702.

703

- Death of Loingsech mac Óengusso. He was an Irish king who was High King of Ireland.
- Congal Cennmagair becomes High King of Ireland. He belonged to the northern Cenél Conaill branch of the Uí Néill.

704

- Death of Adomnán, ninth abbot of Iona (b. c 627).

707

- The Uí Néill High King of Ireland Congal Cennmagair campaigned in Leinster and obtained Cellach Cualann's submission to his authority.

708 or 710

- High King of Ireland Congal Cennmagair died 708, or 710 according to some sources.

709

- Lethlobar mac Echach died. He was a Dal nAraide king of the Cruithne in Ulaid (Ulster).

709 or 710

- Fergal mac Máele Dúin in 709, or 710 according to some sources, becomes High King of Ireland. Fergal belonged to the Cenél nEógain sept of the northern Uí Néill.

== 710s ==
711

- Death of Seachnasach, the 17th king of the Uí Maine.

714

- Fogartach mac Néill was deposed as king of Brega and exiled in Britain.

715

- Death of Cellach Cualann mac Gerthidi, the last Uí Máil king of Leinster. Cellach's byname is derived from the land of Cualu which lay around Glendalough.

718

- Death of Conall Grant mac Cernaig, a King of Brega of the Uí Chernaig sept of Lagore of the Síl nÁedo Sláine. He was the grandson of the high king Diarmait mac Áedo Sláine. His father Cernach Sotal had died during plague years in 664.

719

- Áed mac Cellaig, son of Cellach Cualann, was slain at the Battle of Finnabair (Fennor, County Kildare) in a fight among the Laigin.

== 720s ==
721

- Cathal mac Finguine becomes King of Munster, reigning until his death in 742.

722

- 11 December: death of Fergal mac Máele Dúin, a High King of Ireland. Fergal belonged to the Cenél nEógain sept of the northern Uí Néill.

724

- Death of Fogartach mac Néill, sometimes called Fogartach ua Cernaich, an Irish king who is reckoned a High King of Ireland. He belonged to the Uí Chernaig sept of the Síl nÁedo Sláine branch of the southern Uí Néill. He was King of Brega and was the son of Niall mac Cernaig Sotal

727

- Death of Murchad mac Brain Mut, was a King of Leinster from the Uí Dúnlainge branch of the Laigin. He was the son of Bran Mut mac Conaill (died 693), a previous king. He ruled since 715.

728

- Death of Dúnchad mac Murchado, a King of Leinster from the Uí Dúnlainge branch of the Laigin. He was the son of Murchad mac Brain Mut, the previous king.

729

- Death of Cathal mac Néill or Cathal Cerr or Cathal Corc, a king of Southern Brega at Lagore. He belonged to the Uí Chernaig sept of the Síl nÁedo Sláine branch of the southern Uí Néill. He was the son of Niall mac Cernaig Sotal. He ruled the Uí Chernaig from 724-729 succeeding his brother the high king Fogartach mac Néill.

== 730s ==
733

- Birth of Donnchad mac Domnaill, called Donnchad Midi, High King of Ireland. His father, Domnall Midi, had been the first Uí Néill High King from the south-central Clann Cholmáin based in modern County Westmeath and western County Meath, Ireland. The reigns of Domnall and his successor, Niall Frossach of the Cenél nEógain, had been relatively peaceful, but Donnchad's rule saw a return to a more expansionist policy directed against Leinster, traditional target of the Uí Néill, and also, for the first time, the great southern kingdom of Munster.

734

- Abduction of Flaithbertach mac Loingsig. Cenél Conaill now excluded from Uí Néill Overkingship.

738

- Death of Fáelán mac Murchado, a King of Leinster from the Uí Dúnlainge branch of the Laigin. He was the son of Murchad mac Brain Mut, a previous king. He ruled since the death of his brother Dúnchad in 728.

== 740s ==
741

- Death of Indrechtach mac Lethlobair a Dal nAraide king of the Cruithne in Ulaid (Ulster).

742

- Death of Conaing mac Amalgado, a King of Brega from the Uí Chonaing sept of Cnogba (Knowth) of the Síl nÁedo Sláine branch of the southern Uí Néill. He was the son of Amalgaid mac Congalaig (died 718), a previous king. He ruled from 728-742.
- Death of Cathal mac Finguine, King of Munster, who had reigned since 721.
- Death of Áed Balb mac Indrechtaig, King of Connacht.

743

- Clann Cholmáin takes the Overkingship of Uí Néill.

748

- Dúngal mac Amalgado or Dúngal Cnogba, from the Uí Chonaing sept of Cnogba (Knowth) of the Síl nÁedo Sláine branch of the southern Uí Néill became King of Brega . He was the brother of Conaing mac Amalgado (died 742), a previous king. He ruled until his death in 759.

== 750s ==
759

- Death of Dúngal mac Amalgado.

== 760s ==
760

- Start of the reign of Cellach mac Dúnchada, (died 776), as King of Leinster. He was the son of Dúnchad mac Murchado (died 728), a previous king. The royal seat was at Líamhain (Lyons Hill, on the Dublin-Kildare border).

763

- 20 November: death of Domnall Midi or Domnall mac Murchado (born before 715), King of Mide and, according to the later lists, High King of Ireland.

764

- Diarmait Dub, brother of Donnchad Midi was killed leading the forces of the monastery of Durrow in battle against those of Clonmacnoise, led by Bressal mac Murchado, who was either his father's brother or his brother's son.

765

- Death of Flaithbertach mac Loingsig, high-king of Ireland

766

- Donnchad Midi or Donnchad mac Domnaill becomes King of Mide

768

- Cú Dínaisc mac Conasaig becomes Abbot of Armagh

769

- St. Maelruain’s Monastery founded in Tallaght

== 770s ==
770

- Donnchad Midi, King of Mide, succeeded to the Kingship of Tara and the supposed High Kingship of Ireland when Niall Frossach abdicated.
- Ciarán the Pious of Bealach-duin, who founded Castlekeeran monastery died.

771

- Niall mac Conaill, son of Conall Grant mac Cernaig (died 718), becomes King of South Brega. He ruled until 778.

775

- Donnchad Midi, King of Mide took control of the monastery at Clonard in the Leinster borderlands. He also campaigned in Munster. The Annals of Ulster record that Donnchad "did great devastation in the territory of the Munstermen, and many of the Munstermen fell".

776

- Death of Cellach mac Dúnchada, King of Leinster.

777

- Donnchad Midi is recorded as twice having disturbed the óenach of Tailtiu, first in 774, when no explanation is given, and again in 777. The annals state that the Ciannachta, by which the Síl nÁedo Sláine, this time the north Brega branch of the kindred, are meant, were the targets. This is explicitly linked to the war between Donnchad and Congalach mac Conaing, the King of Knowth, which had begun earlier in 777 when Donnchad led an army from Leinster into Brega.

778

- Donnchad Midi of Clann Cholmáin becomes King of Tara (but see also 770).
- Death of Niall mac Conaill, King of South Brega
- Death of Mac Flaithniadh, Abbot of Clonfert.

779

- Donnchad Midi campaigned against the northern Uí Néill and received the submission of the "king of the North", Domnall, son of Áed Muinderg.

== 780s ==
782

- Death of Mugrón mac Flainn, king of the Uí Failge

785

- Death of Ruaidrí mac Fáeláin, son of Fáelán mac Murchado (died 738), King of Leinster The royal seat was at Naas in the eastern part of the Liffey plain, Airthir Liphi. He ruled from 776-785.

786

- Death of Diarmait mac Conaing, King of South Brega, son of Conall Grant mac Cernaig (died 718) He ruled in south Brega since 778.

== 790s ==
791

- Death of Cú Dínaisc mac Conasaig (also called Cudinaisc, Cudinaisg, Cú Dínisc, Cudiniscus) (b. c.720 ), was a former Abbot of Armagh, 777 - 782.

792

- Death of Mael Ruain, leader of the Culdee reform movement at Tallaght.

793

- Artrí mac Cathail ordained King of Munster

795

- First Viking raids on Ireland at Iona, Rathlin Island, Inishmurray and Inishbofin.
- Viking raid on Lambay Island

797

- Death of Donnchad Midi, King of Mide.
- Death of Muireadhach mac Olcobhar, Abbot of Clonfert.

798

- Viking raid on St Patrick's Island off the coast of County Dublin.

799

- Death of Domnall mac Donnchado, King of Mide since 797.
