= Domnall Midi =

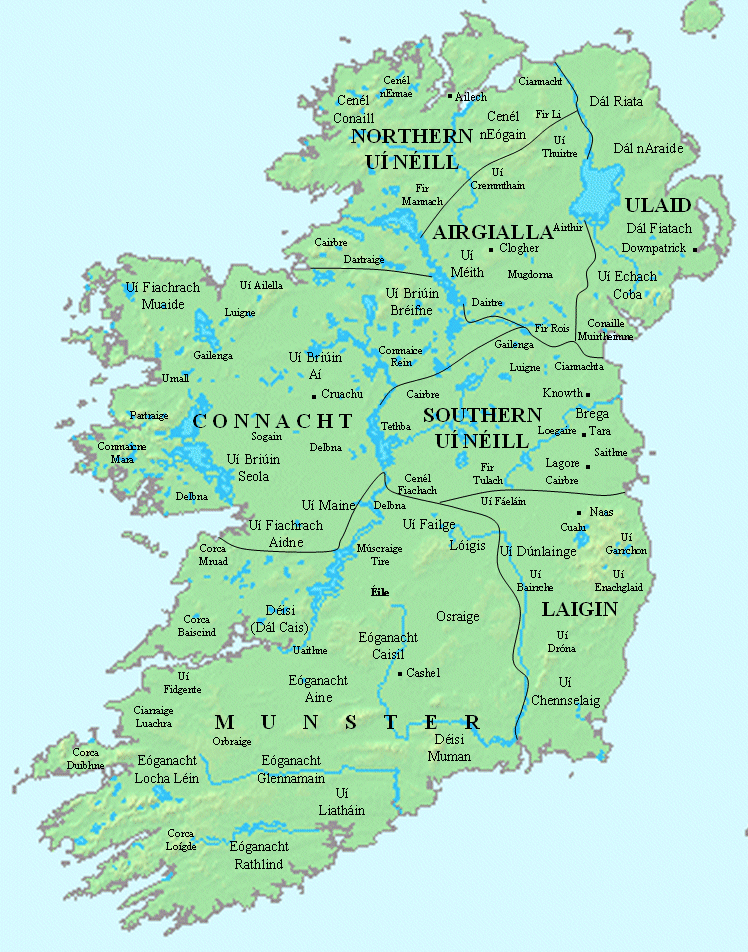
Ireland in the 8th century. The kingdoms of Uisnech and Mide are not shown; they lie underneath the words "Southern Uí Néill".

Domhnall Mac Murchada (born c. 700, died 20 November 763), called Domnall Midi (Donald of Meath), was High King of Ireland. He belonged to the Clann Cholmáin branch of the Uí Néill. Clann Cholmáin's pre-eminence among the southern Uí Néill, which would last until the rise of Brian Bóruma and the end of the Uí Néill dominance in Ireland, dates from his lifetime.

Domnall was chief of Clann Cholmáin for almost fifty years, and High King of Ireland for twenty. In spite of this, and his importance as a dynast, the Irish annals contain relatively few reports of his activities. He was a patron of the Columban churches, particularly Durrow Abbey, where he is buried.

== Origins and background ==
Domnall was a son of Murchad mac Diarmato. He had at least one sibling, a brother named Coirpre who died in 749, and it is likely that the Bressal mac Murchado who was killed in 764 was also his brother. Domnall's father ruled as king of Uisnech from the death of his father, Diarmait Dian, in 689 until his own death in 715. He was killed by Conall Grant of the Síl nÁedo Sláine branch of the southern Uí Néill. A year earlier Murchad drove out Conall's nephew Fogartach mac Néill, probably the chief king among the southern Uí Néill, who was exiled to Britain. The notice of Murchad's death calls him "king of the Uí Néill", meaning that he was the southern deputy of then-High King Fergal mac Máele Dúin of the northern Cenél nEógain.

== King of Uisnech, King of Mide ==
According to later king lists such as those in the Book of Leinster, Domnall succeeded his father as king of Uisnech on the latter's death. If this is correct, the Irish annals take no notice of him, and it is not until 730 that he is first mentioned. During this time, the internecine conflict within the Síl nÁedo Sláine continued. Fergal mac Máele Dúin had died in battle in Leinster in 722. Fogartach mac Néill, who had returned to Ireland in 716 and was once again chief king among the southern Uí Néill, later Fergal's deputy, succeeded him. Fogartach was killed in battle against his Síl nÁedo Sláine kinsman Cináed mac Írgalaig in 724. Cináed was killed in 728 fighting against Flaithbertach mac Loingsig of the northern Cenél Conaill who became High King after this victory.

In the early 730s war broke out among the northern Uí Néill. Flaithbertach was defeated in 732 by Fergal's elder son Áed Allán and the Cenél Conaill were again defeated by Áed in 733 when Fergus, son of Congal Cendmagair, was killed. Flaithbertach was again defeated by Áed in 734. The Annals of Ulster, which rarely record the beginnings of the reigns of high kings in this period, record that Áed was inaugurated later in 734. Flaithbertach had been deposed, although he survived and entered religion, dying in 765, having outlived two successors.

Perhaps taking advantage of this strife, the King of Munster, Cathal mac Finguine, invaded the midlands in 733. Cathal encamped at Tailtiu, where the Uí Néill high kings traditionally held their main óenach. He was attacked there by Domnall and driven off although he later defeated the minor Uí Néill kindred of Clann Cholmáin Bicc led by Fallomon mac Con Congalt at the Hill of Ward, the site of another major Uí Néill óenach.

Áed Allán's reign was remembered as a time of war. He began by attacking his traditional enemies, the Ulaid, in 735. Áed Róin, the King of Ulster, was killed at a battle near Faughart. The war among the Síl nÁedo Sláine continued in 737 and that same year Áed met with Cathal mac Finguine at Terryglass. Exactly what was agreed there is unknown, but the annals also state that the law of Saint Patrick was in force throughout Ireland. It may be that Áed and Cathal agreed on an alliance against Leinster. Áed's father Fergal had been killed campaigning there, and the annals are full of Cathal's generally unsuccessful campaigns against the Leinstermen. In the following Áed and Cathal separately attacked Leinster. Áed's invasion led to the battle of Áth Senaig, fought on 14 September 738 near Ballyshannon, County Kildare, also called the battle of the groans. This was a crushing defeat for Leinster. Their king, Áed mac Colggen, was killed, as was Bran Becc mac Murchado. The Annals of Ulster say: "so many fell in this great battle that we find no comparable slaughter in a single onslaught and fierce conflict throughout all preceding ages." Later Cathal campaigned in Leinster and apparently took hostages and tribute from the new king, perhaps Fáelán mac Murchado.

In 739 the Annals of Ulster record that some of Domnall's household were burned to death in a banqueting hall at the unidentified Bodbráith. The enemy are not named. The following year Domnall, it is reported, "went off into clerical life".

== King of Tara ==
In 743 Domnall defeated and killed Áed Allán and a number of kings of the Airgíalla, perhaps at Mag Sered near Kells, although some annals place the battle in modern County Longford, either location suggesting that Áed was the aggressor. The annals offer no explanation as to why the two were at war, but it has been suggested that Áed's expansion into the lands of the Conailli Muirthemne (in modern County Louth) or the killing of Conaing mac Amalgado, king of Brega, supposedly strangled by Áed in 742, may have been connected to Domnall's return.

Having defeated Áed, the Annals of Ulster state that Domnall again entered the religious life in 744. When Flaithbertach's son Áed Muinderg died in 747, the Annals of Ulster call him "king of the North", suggesting that he was Domnall's deputy among the northern Uí Néill. Domnall seems also to have had a deputy in the south. His distant kinsman Fallomon mac Con Congalt of Clann Cholmáin Bicc may have been king of Mide in 733, and is definitely styled as such at his death in 766.

Other than this, very little is recorded of Domnall during the twenty years in which he is reckoned to have been High King of Ireland. Unlike Áed Allán, he maintained good relations with the Uí Dúnlainge kings of Leinster. In 753 he is said to have imposed the "law of Columba" on behalf of Sléibéne, Abbot of Iona. Domnall's support for Iona, a policy followed by his descendants, caused the principal Columban church to move to Kells during the Viking Age.

There is only one report of Domnall at war, this in 756. The Annals of Ulster report that Domnall led an army from Leinster into Conailli Muirthemne. This again suggests that he saw the presence of the Cenél nEógain on the eastern coast as a threat to his family's power and emphasizes his good relations with the kings of Leinster.

Domnall died in 763 and was buried at Durrow Abbey in present-day County Offaly. Although he enjoyed good relations with Iona and was seemingly devout, he was not well regarded by all Irish churchmen. The Félire Óengusso, written at Tallaght in the borderlands of Leinster, apparently includes him among the oppressive secular rulers whom the authors held in contempt.

== Successors, descendants and family ==
According to the lists of High Kings and the evidence of the annals, Domnall was followed as High King by Niall Frossach, Áed Allán's younger brother. The succession to the leadership of Clann Cholmáin was disputed.

Domnall had at least five sons and at least one daughter. His only recorded wife is Ailbíne ingen Ailello. His son Donnchad Midi was also High King. His son, Muiredach, who died in 802, was named king of Mide in the report of his death. Domnall's son Diarmait Dub died in 764, leading an army raised from the lands of Durrow Abbey. His opponent, his uncle or nephew Bressal mac Murchado, was leading the forces of the monastery of Clonmacnoise. Domnall's son Murchad, died in battle in 765, fighting against Donnchad. Domnall's son Indrechtach died in 797, soon after his brother Donnchad.

Domnall's daughter Eithne was killed, with her husband Bran Ardchenn, King of Leinster, on 6 May 795 at Cell Cúile Dumai, near modern Abbeyleix, County Laois, by Fínsnechta Cetharderc, a rival for the kingship of Leinster.

Domnall's later descendants included the High Kings Conchobar mac Donnchada, Máel Sechnaill mac Máele Ruanaid, Flann Sinna, Donnchad Donn and Máel Sechnaill mac Domnaill.

Domnall Midi Clann Cholmáin
Regnal titles
Preceded by Uncertain	King of Mide c. 743 – 763	Succeeded by Fallomon mac Con Congalt
