= Amalgaid mac Congalaig =

Amalgaid mac Congalaig (died 718) was a King of Brega from the Uí Chonaing sept of Cnogba (Knowth) of the Síl nÁedo Sláine branch of the southern Ui Neill. He was the son of Congalach mac Conaing Cuirre (died 696). He ruled in north Brega from 702 to 718.

Amalgaid's reign was dominated by the feuds among the septs of the Síl nÁedo Sláine and the beginnings of the return to power of the Clann Cholmáin of Uisnech. The kingship of Brega at this time was in rivalry between the septs of Uí Chonaing and the southern sept of the Uí Chernaig sept of Lagore in south Brega. Two contemporary members of the rival sept, Fogartach mac Néill (died 724) and Conall Grant mac Cernaig Sotal (died 718) were also counted as kings of Brega during this time. The Uí Chonaing were allied with the Síl nDlúthaig of Fir Cúl Breg.

The feud among the southern and northern septs had been intensified by the murder of Niall mac Cernaig Sotal (died 701) by Amalgaid's uncle Irgalach mac Conaing Cuirre (died 702). This was intensified when Amalgaid's ally Flann mac Áedo (died 714) of Síl nDlúthaig defeated and slew Maine mac Néill of Uí Chernaig in battle in 712.

The high king Fergal mac Máele Dúin (died 722) of the Cenél nEógain seems to have favored Clann Cholmáin in Meath and intervened in the affairs of the midlands. In 711, the Battle of Sliab Fúait (in the Fews, Co. Armagh) is recorded where Fergal was victorious and Cú Raí mac Áedo of Síl nDlúthaig was slain along with the king of Uí Méith. In 714, Fergal's southern deputy Murchad Midi (died 715) of Uisnech fought the Battle of Bile Tened (Billywood, Co. Meath) where Amalgaid's ally Flann was slain. The battle was not decisive however. The attention of Fergal then went on the Uí Chernaig.

In 718, the Battle of Cenannas (near Kells) was fought between the rival septs and Conall Grant of the Uí Chernaig was victorious. Amalgaid and his brother Fergal were slain along with their allies, Gormgal mac Áedo of Síl nDlúthaig and Tuathal Ua Fáelchon of Clann Cholmáin Bicc.

His sons Conaing mac Amalgado (died 742) and Dúngal mac Amalgado (died 759) were also Kings of Brega.

== See also ==
- Kings of Brega
