= Áed mac Dlúthaig =

Áed mac Dlúthaig (died 701) was a King of Fir Cúl in Brega of the Síl nDlúthaig sept of the Síl nÁedo Sláine of Brega. He was the grandson of Ailill Cruitire mac Áedo Sláine (died 634), a king of Brega.

== Biography ==
In his time the Síl nDlúthaig were closely associated with the Uí Chonaing sept of Cnogba (Knowth) in rivalry with the southern septs of Síl nÁedo Sláine, including the Uí Chernaig sept of Lagore. Áed was involved in two killings. In 689 Áed killed Diarmait Dian mac Airmetaig Cáech, the King of Uisnech in Mide of the Clann Cholmáin. This was an old feud; Diarmait's grandfather Conall Guthbinn (died 635) had slain Áed's grandfather Ailill Cruitire (died 634).

Then in 695 Áed and Congalach mac Conaing Cuirre (died 696) of the Uí Chonaing were responsible for the death of the high king Fínsnechta Fledach and his son Bresal of the southern Clan Fínsnechtai sept at Grellaigh Dollaith. According to the Annals of Tigernach, this occurred in battle, but the Fragmentary Annals of Ireland state that Finsnechta was murdered in a tent by Congalach and Áed.

Áed is listed as one of the guarantors of the Cáin Adomnáin ("Law of the Innocents") of Saint Adomnán arranged at the Synod of Birr in 697 where he is called King of Cúl.

His sons included:

- Cú Raí mac Áedo (died 711) slain in the Battle of Sliab Fúait versus the high king Fergal mac Máele Dúin (died 722) of the Cenél nEógain.
- Flann mac Áedo (died 714) slain in the Battle of Bile Tened versus Murchad Midi (died 715) of Uisnech.
- Gormgal mac Áedo (died 718) slain in the Battle of Kells versus Conall Grant (died 718) of Uí Chernaig of Brega.
