= Coirpre mac Fogartaig =

Coirpre mac Fogartaig (died 771) was a King of Brega of the Uí Chernaig sept of Lagore of the Síl nÁedo Sláine branch of the southern Ui Neill. He was the son of the high king Fogartach mac Néill (died 724).

He is not listed in the poem on the Síl nÁedo Sláine rulers in the Book of Leinster, however at his death obit in the annals for 771 he is called King of Brega. His accession to the rule of the Uí Chernaig sept in south Brega cannot be dated with certainty. His brother Fergus mac Fogartaig (died 751) is called King of South Brega at his death obit. The annals then record the deaths of his cousin Domnall mac Áeda in 759 and his brother Finsnechta mac Fogartaig in 761 with no titles. As for his accession to all of Brega, the death of the Brega king Dúngal mac Amalgado of the rival northern Uí Chonaing sept of Cnogba (Knowth) occurred in 759.

Coirpre is first mentioned in the annals with regard to the death of his son Cellach, who was killed by robbers in 767. Then Coirpre is driven into exile in 769 by Donnchad Midi (died 797) of the rival southern Ui Neill branch of Clann Cholmáin based in Mide. A battle had been fought between the men of Mide and Brega in 766. The year after Coirpre's exile the men of southern Brega were defeated at the Battle of Bolgg Bóinne in 770 and two members of the sept were slain, Cernach mac Flainn (a grandson of Fogartach) and Flaithbertach mac Flainn as well as the vassal king Uarchride mac Baeth of the Deisi Brega. This was in conjunction with a campaign of Donnchad Midi versus Leinster and may have been part of that or Donnchad may have defeated the men of southern Brega on is way home. Coirpre then reappears in the year 771 at his death obit with the title King of Brega.

== See also ==
- Kings of Brega
