= Diarmait Dian =

Diarmait Dian mac Airmetaig, also Diarmait Guthbinn, (died 689) was King of Uisnech in Mide of the Clann Cholmáin. He was the grandson of Conall Guthbinn mac Suibni (died 635), a previous king. His father Airmetach Cáech was slain at the Battle of Mag Rath in 637. Diarmait ruled from 653 to 689.

The feud between Clann Cholmáin and the Síl nÁedo Sláine of the early 7th century had ended in victory for the Síl nÁedo Sláine who dominated the high kingship of Ireland in the second half of the 7th century. They began to feud among themselves, and Clann Cholmain was caught up in the feud as well. In 662, a member of the cousin line of Clann Cholmáin Bicc, Fáelchú mac Máele Umai was slain at the Battle of Ogamain fighting on the side of Conaing Cuirre mac Congaile of Cnogba and Blathmac mac Áedo Sláine (died 665) while fighting the adherents of Diarmait mac Áedo Sláine (died 665).

Diarmait himself was killed in 689 as part of the old feud by Áed mac Dlúthaig (died 701) of the Fir Cúl Breg sept of Síl nÁedo Sláine. Áed's grandfather Ailill Cruitire mac Áedo Sláine was slain in battle by Diarmait's grandfather Conall Guthbinn in 634. According to the Book of Leinster, Conall Guthbinn was killed by the High King Fínsnechta Fledach mac Dúnchado (died 695) of Brega.

Diarmait's sons included:

- Murchad Midi mac Diarmato Dian (died 715),
- Áed mac Diarmaito Dian, listed as King of Uisnech, killed in the battle of Mag Singittae, near Billywood, Meath, Leinster, Ireland in 714
- Colgu mac Diarmaito Dian, listed as King of Uisnech, killed in the battle of Mag Singittae, near Billywood, Meath, Leinster, Ireland in 714
- Bodbchad, killed in the battle, Clane (Claeneth, claenad), Kildare, Leinster, Ireland in 704.

Diarmait's grandson Domnall Midi mac Murchado (died 763) was a high king of Ireland.

== See also ==
- Kings of Uisnech
