= Cummascach mac Congalaig =

Cummascach mac Congalaig (died 839) was a King of Brega from the Uí Chonaing sept of Cnogba (Knowth) of the Síl nÁedo Sláine branch of the southern Uí Néill. He was the son of Congalach mac Conaing (died 778) and brother of Flann mac Congalaig (died 812) and Cernach mac Congalaig (died 818), previous kings. He ruled from 818 to 839.

The Uí Chonaing sept had conquered the lands of the Ciannachta (south of the Lower Boyne in modern County Meath, Ireland) and were often styled Kings of Ciannachta in this period. In 822 Cummascach defeated the remnants of this population group, the Ard Ciannachta (in County Louth), at the Battle of Carn Conain and their king, Eudus mac Tigernaig was slain. Cummascach then was confronted by a rival among his own sept named Dúnchad, they fought a skirmish in 824 in which Dúnchad was victorious and Cummascach escaped. Cummascach seems to have remained king, however, and the fate of this Dúnchad is unknown.

The Vikings became active in the midlands during his reign. In 827 they plundered Ciannachta. In 828 they slew the king of Ard Ciannachta, Cináed mac Cummascaig. In 832 The Vikings plundered Dom Líacc (Duleek) and the sept of the Ciannacht with all their churches. The Vikings also plundered the church of Sláine in 834.

In 837 a great fleet appeared on the Boyne and ravaged the plain of Brega defeating the Uí Néill in the Battle of Inber na mBárc on the Boyne estuary. The Ciannacht were, however, able to eventually win a victory over the Norse and slew their leader Saxolb.

Cummascach died in 839 and is styled rex Ciannactai — King of Ciannachta — in the annals.
