= Cummascach mac Fogartaig =

Cummascach mac Fogartaig (died 797) was King of South Brega of the Uí Chernaig sept of Lagore of the Síl nÁedo Sláine branch of the southern Ui Neill. He was the son of Fogartach mac Cummascaig (died 786), the previous king. He ruled from 786 to 797.

The Síl nÁedo Sláine had been subdued in 786 by the high king Donnchad Midi (died 797). Nothing is recorded of Cummascach's reign other than his death in clerical life in 797. He is referred to as rex Deisceirt Breg -King of Southern Brega.
