= Fogartach mac Cummascaig =

Fogartach mac Cummascaig (died 786) was King of South Brega of the Uí Chernaig sept of Lagore of the Síl nÁedo Sláine branch of the southern Ui Neill. He was the grandson of the high-king Fogartach mac Néill (died 724). He ruled from 785 to 786.

Fogartach participated in 781 in the Battle of the Rig fought between the Síl nÁedo Sláine and the Uí Garrchon branch of the Laigin with his cousin Máel Dúin mac Fergusa (died 785), who was King of Loch gabor at that time. The campaign was significant in that both septs of the Síl nÁedo Sláine, both the Uí Chernaig and the Uí Chonaing of north Brega, participated together. These two septs had been fighting for much of the eighth century.

In 786 Febordaith, the abbot of Tuilén was killed apparently by the Síl nÁedo Sláine. The high king Donnchad Midi (died 797) avenged this by attacking and defeating the forces of the Síl nÁedo Sláine at the Battle of Lia Finn or Tuilén and Fogartach was slain along with his kinsmen. Both septs, the Uí Chernaig and the Uí Chonaing, again participated.

Fogartach is titled King of Loch Gabor at his death obit in the annals. His son Cummascach mac Fogartaig (died 797) was also King of South Brega.
