= Diarmait mac Conaing =

Diarmait mac Conaing (died 786) was a King of Brega from the Uí Chonaing sept of Cnogba (Knowth) of the Síl nÁedo Sláine branch of the southern Ui Neill. He was the son of Conaing mac Amalgado (died 742) and brother of Congalach mac Conaing (died 778), previous kings. He ruled from 778 to 786.

The high king Donnchad Midi (died 797) had campaigned against Leinster in 780 and then made peace. The next year in 781 the Battle of the Rig was fought between the Síl nÁedo Sláine and the Uí Garrchon branch of the Laigin and their king Cú Chongalt was slain. Donnchad had subdued Brega in 778 and the annals do not mention whether this campaign versus the Uí Garrchon was part of Donnchad's campaign or an act of defiance by the men of Brega or simply a border warfare with no connection. The campaign is significant in that both septs of the Síl nÁedo Sláine, both the Uí Chernaig and the Uí Chonaing of north Brega, participated together. These two septs had been fighting for much of the eighth century. Diarmait and his cousin Conaing mac Dúngaile led the Uí Chonaing sept.

In 786 Febordaith, the abbot of Tuilén was killed apparently by the Síl nÁedo Sláine. The high king Donnchad Midi revenged this by attacking and defeating the forces of the Síl nÁedo Sláine at the Battle of Lia Finn or Tuilén and Diarmait was slain along with his kinsman Conaing mac Dúngaile Both septs, the Uí Chernaig and the Uí Chonaing, again participated.
