= Diarmait mac Áedo Sláine =

Diarmait (died 665) was a son of Áed Sláine. According to the Irish annals, he was High King of Ireland.

== Sons of Áed Sláine ==
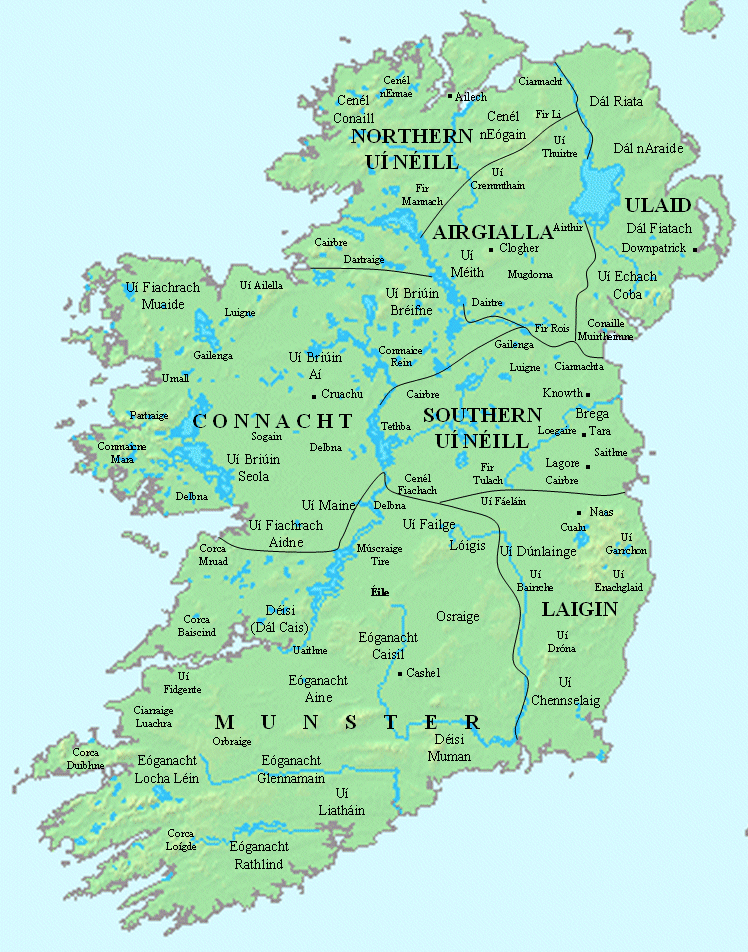
Peoples and kingdoms in early Ireland.

Diarmait's father Áed Sláine was a son of Diarmait mac Cerbaill, the apical ancestor of the southern branches of the Uí Néill kindred which dominated Ireland from the late 6th century until the rise of Brian Bóruma in the late 10th century. The descendants of Áed Sláine were known as the Síl nÁedo Sláine. With the possible exception of Óengus mac Colmáin, all Uí Néill kings descended from Diarmait mac Cerbaill belonged to the Síl nÁedo Sláine until the death of Cináed mac Írgalaig in 728. The Síl nÁedo Sláine were Kings of Brega, and the Hill of Tara, where High Kings were inaugurated, lay within their lands. Other groups descended from the sons of Diarmait included Clann Cholmáin, or more precisely Clann Cholmáin Már, descended from Colmán Már, which replaced the Síl nÁedo Sláine as the dominant group of the southern Uí Néill from the middle of the 8th century, and the less important Caílle Follamain or Clann Cholmáin Bicc, descended from Colmán Beg.

Áed Sláine himself is said to have been High King jointly with Colmán Rímid of the northern Cenél nEógain branch of the Uí Néill, following the death of Áed mac Ainmuirech. Áed Sláine died circa 604, a death said to have been prophesied by Saint Columba. Áed's sons are said to have included Diarmait, Blathmac (died 665), Congal (died 634), Ailill (died 634), and Dúnchad (died 659).

== Domnall mac Áedo and Congal Cáech ==
Diarmait was one of the younger sons of Áed Sláine. According to king lists, the kingship of Brega was held by Congal and then by Ailill, both killed by Conall Guthbinn mac Suibni of Clann Cholmáin in 634, after which Diarmait and his brother Blathmac were jointly kings of Brega. Diarmait killed Conall Guthbinn mac Suibni "in the house of Nad-Fraích's son" according to the Annals of Ulster, in 635. That same year Diarmait defeated Clann Cholmáin Bicc in battle at Cúil Caeláin where Óengus mac Colmáin's son Máel Umai was killed.

At this time the High Kingship of Ireland may have been disputed between Domnall mac Áedo of the northern Cenél Conaill branch of the Uí Néill and the cruithne king Congal Cáech. In this complicated contest Diarmait and Blathmac were allied with Domnall. They fought alongside him at the Battle of Mag Rath where Congal was killed. Some branches of the Uí Néill fought against Domnall and Diarmait's foster-father Lommainnech is said to have killed Conall mac Suibni's son Airmedach in the battle.

== High King ==
The compilers of the various Irish annals were apparently uncertain as to the succession following the death of Domnall mac Áedo in 642. The Annals of Ulster state:

Here it is uncertain who reigned after Domnall. Some historiographers state that four kings, i.e. Cellach, Conall Cóel, and two sons of Aed Sláine son of Diarmait son of Fergus Cerrbél son of Conall of Cremthann son of Niall Noígiallach, namely Diarmait and Blathmac, reigned in mingled rule.

According to the late 7th century Baile Chuind Chétchathaig, a list of High Kings composed in the reign of Diarmait's nephew Fínsnechta Fledach, son of Dúnchad, Domnall mac Áedo was succeeded by Diarmait and Blathmac. The Baile Chuind omits several kings, including Áed Sláine, some of which may be copying errors, but others are apparently deliberate. It is a work of dynastic propaganda, its purpose to demonstrate that the Síl nÁedo Sláine should by right be High Kings of Ireland. For these reasons, although it is the most nearly contemporary witness, it is not necessarily to be trusted.

Of the two or four kings, Diarmait was the most active according to the record which survives in the Irish annals. In 649, he defeated Guaire Aidne mac Colmáin, king of Connacht, at the battle of Carn Conaill. The verse Cath Cairnd Chonaill purports to describe the battle and its context. It states that the king of Munster was present as an ally of Guaire, but this is late and unreliable evidence. In 654, Diarmait killed Conall Cóel and Cellach died in 658.

A plague arrived in Ireland in 664, called the buide Chonaill. The annals record that Diarmait and his brother Blathmac both died of the disease the following year. The king lists have them followed by Blathmac's son Sechnassach, possibly ruling jointly with another son of Blathmac, Cenn Fáelad.

== Descendants and posterity ==
Diarmait's descendants formed the Uí Chernaig branch of the Síl nÁedo Sláine, named for Diarmait's son Cernach. The centre of their power lay around Loch Gabhair in modern County Meath. Few of Diarmait's descendants were major figures in Irish history. His grandson Conall mac Cernaig, usually called Conall Grant, was an important figure in the 710s, and a great-grandson, Fogartach mac Néill, was later High King.

For editors and creators of Middle Irish language literature, the reign of Diarmait and Blathmac was imagined as a Golden Age. Works set in this period include the Cath Cairnd Chonaill and the Scéla Cano meic Gartnáin.
