= Cernach mac Congalaig =

Cernach mac Congalaig (died 818) was a King of Brega from the Uí Chonaing sept of Cnogba (Knowth) of the Síl nÁedo Sláine branch of the southern Ui Neill. He was the son of Congalach mac Conaing (died 778) and brother of Flann mac Congalaig (died 812), previous kings. He ruled from 812-818.

In the early decades of the 8th century an intense rivalry had existed between the northern branch of the Síl nÁedo Sláine represented by the Uí Chonaing and the southern branch represented by the Uí Chernaig of Lagore. This rivalry had been interrupted by the common threat of the rise of the rival branch of Clann Cholmáin of Uisnech. In Cernach's reign this old rivalry appears to have flared up again, the annals record a skirmish in 817 between the Ciannachta and the men of southern Brega, in which many Ciannachta fell. At this time the Uí Chonaing were called kings of Ciannachta in the annals, a population-group they had subjugated in the early 8th century.

Cernach's death obit in the annals is significant in that it is the first time a member of the sept was called King of Cnogba (rex Cnodhbai) in the Annals of Ulster.
