= Congal mac Áedo Sláine =

Congal mac Áedo Sláine (died 634) was a King of Brega from the Síl nÁedo Sláine branch of the southern Ui Neill. He was the son of the high king Áed Sláine mac Diarmato (died 604).

His father had treacherously slain his nephew, Suibne mac Colmáin (died 600) of the Clann Cholmáin and was then himself slain in battle by Suibne's son Conall Guthbinn setting off a feud among the southern Ui Neill. The date of Congal's accession to Brega is not stated in the annals. His brother Conall Laeg Breg was slain in the Battle of Odba by Óengus mac Colmáin Bec (died 621) in 612.

In 634 Congal and his brother Ailill Cruitire were defeated and slain at the Battle of Loch Trethin at Fremainn (Loch Drethin at Frewin Hill, Co.Westmeath) by the same Conall Guthbinn who had slain their father. Congal is recorded as king of Brega in the annals regarding this event.

Congal's son Conaing Cuirre (died 662) was also a king of Brega and ancestor of the Uí Chonaing of Cnogba (Knowth) or North Brega.

== See also ==
- Kings of Brega
