= Congalach mac Conaing =

Congalach mac Conaing (died 778) was a King of Brega from the Uí Chonaing sept of Cnogba (Knowth) of the Síl nÁedo Sláine branch of the southern Ui Neill. He was the son of Conaing mac Amalgado (died 742), a previous king.

He is listed as the successor to his uncle Dúngal mac Amalgado (died 759) in a poem in the Book of Leinster; it appears that this was just to leadership of the Uí Chonaing who were called kings of Ciannachta at this time. The annals mention Coirpre mac Fogartaig (died 771), of the rival Uí Chernaig sept of Lagore in south Brega, as King of Brega. Congalach would have ruled all Brega from 771 to 778.

The Ciannachta are mentioned as having participated in the expedition of the high king Donnchad Midi (died 797) against Leinster. They separately attacked the Uí Théig branch of the Laigin and crushed them at the Battle of Ath Cliath. However many of them were drowned in the full tide when returning.

Donnchad and Congalach appear as enemies in the annals and this may be due to a rivalry regarding succession to the high kingship on the abdication of Niall Frossach (died 778) of the Cenél nEógain. In 777, Donnchad led a hosting of the Laigin against Brega. Then in that same year Donnchad caused a disturbance at an assembly versus the Ciannachta leading to outright war. This war ended in the Battle of Forchalad in 778 in victory for Donnchad with Congalach and many others slain including Dúnchad mac Aléni, king of Mugdorna. The Annals of Ulster say of this event:

From the battle of Forchalad which was fought on a gloomy sad Sunday, many a fond mother was sorrowful the Monday on the morrow.

His sons included Flann mac Congalaig (died 812), Cernach mac Congalaig (died 818), Cummascach mac Congalaig (died 839), all kings of Brega, and a son named Cellach.

== See also ==
- Kings of Brega
