= Ailill mac Fergusa =

King of Brega

King of Brega
- Died: 800

Ailill mac Fergusa (died 800) was King of South Brega of the Uí Chernaig sept of Lagore of the Síl nÁedo Sláine branch of the southern Ui Neill. He was the son of Fergus mac Fogartaig (died 751) and brother of Máel Dúin mac Fergusa (died 785), previous kings. he ruled from 797 to 800.

The annals record that he died from being thrown from a horse. He is styled rex Deisceirt Bregh-King of South Brega.
