= Indrechtach mac Dungalaig =

Indrechtach mac Dungalaig (died 748) was a King of Brega from the Uí Chonaing sept of Cnogba (Knowth) of the Síl nÁedo Sláine branch of the southern Ui Neill. He was the grandson of Conaing Cuirre (died 662), a previous king. He ruled from 742 to 748.

In 743 he fought the Battle of Daim Deirg in Brega where he defeated Dúngal mac Flainn, king of Fir Chúl, who was slain. The Síl nDlúthaig sept of the Síl nÁedo Sláine had been allies of the Uí Chonaing in their rivalry with the southern Brega sept of Uí Chernaig and this is the first time these two septs are mentioned in conflict in the Annals of Ulster. Indrechtach is called king of Ciannachta (regis Ciannachte) in his death obit in the annals.

== See also ==
- Kings of Brega
