= Conall Guthbinn =

King of Uisnech, 7th century Ireland

Conall mac Suibni (died 635), called Conall Guthbinn, Prince of Meath, was King of Uisnech in Mide of the Clann Cholmáin. He was the son of Suibne mac Colmáin (died 600), a previous king. He ruled from 621 to 635. His byname Guthbinn meant "sweet voiced".

His father Suibne had been killed in 600 by his uncle Áed Sláine mac Diarmato (died 604) eponymous ancestor of the Síl nÁedo Sláine. This set off a feud between the Clann Cholmáin and Síl nÁedo Sláine and in 604 a battle was fought in Faithche Mic Mencnain on the shore of Loch Semdid (Lough Sewdy), (Ballymore Loughsewdy in modern County Westmeath). During the battle Conall saw his foster brother Áed Gustan slaying Áed Sláine. Áed Rón of the Uí Failge and Áed Buide, king of Tebtha, Áed Sláine's allies, were also slain.

The Annals of Ulster record:

It was no time when counsel prevailed, for the warriors beyond Tuirbe: Conall slew Áed of Sláine, Áed Sláine slew Suibne.

Conall succeeded as King of Uisnech in 621 on the death of Óengus mac Colmáin, son of Colmán Bec. In 622, during the Battle of Cenn Deilgthen (modern Kildalkey in County Meath), Conall defeated a rival faction of cousins led by two sons of Librén, son of Illand, son of Cerball. Illand was the brother of Conall's great-grandfather the high king Diarmait mac Cerbaill (died 565). Domnall Brecc (died 642), later king of Dál Riata fought alongside Conall.

In 633, at the Battle of Áth Goan, west of the Liffey, Conall allied with Faílbe Flann mac Áedo Duib (died 637), the king of Munster, to assist Fáelán mac Colmáin (died 666?) of the Uí Dúnlainge in defeating and slaying Crimthann mac Áedo of the Uí Máil, acquiring the throne of Leinster. The Clann Cholmain assisted the Ui Dunlainge in their rise to power, neutralizing the border situation with the Ui Failgi, as the Ui Dunlainge carried out their rivalry with the Síl nÁedo Sláine. Fáelán mac Colmáin married Conall's sister Uasal ingen Suibni (died 643).

In 634, at the Battle of Loch Trethin at Fremainn (Lough Drin, .75 miles northeast of Cullionbeg, County Westmeath), Conall slew Congal mac Áedo Sláine, King of Brega, and his brother Ailill Cruitire, continuing the feud with the Síl nÁedo Sláine. In 635 Diarmait mac Áedo Sláine (died 665) killed Conall in the house of Nad Fraích's son.

Conall's son Airmetach Cáech was slain at the Battle of Mag Rath (modern day Moira, County Down) in 637 fighting for Congal Cáech of Ulaid and against the High King Domnall mac Áedo (died 642) of the Cenél Conaill. Airmetach's son Fáelchú was also slain in this battle. Airmetach's other son, Diarmait Dian mac Airmetaig Cáech (died 689), was a King of Uisnech.
