= Cernach mac Fergusa =

Cernach mac Fergusa (died 805) was a king of in south Brega of the Uí Chernaig sept of Lagore of the Síl nÁedo Sláine branch of the Southern Uí Néill. He was the son of Fergus mac Fogartaig (died 751) and brother of Máel Dúin mac Fergusa (died 785) and Ailill mac Fergusa (died 800), previous kings.

Cernach succeeded his brother Ailill as King of Lagore but the rule of South Brega went to a subsect of the Uí Chernaig, the Síl Conaill Graint which were based at Calatrium. He ruled as King of Lagore from 800 to 805. At his death notice in the annals, he is called rex Locha Gabor -King of Lagore. The title King of Loch Gabor was used when members of this sept were not Kings of South Brega (instead held by the sub-sept Síl Conaill Graint).
