= Murchad Midi =

Irish king (died 715)

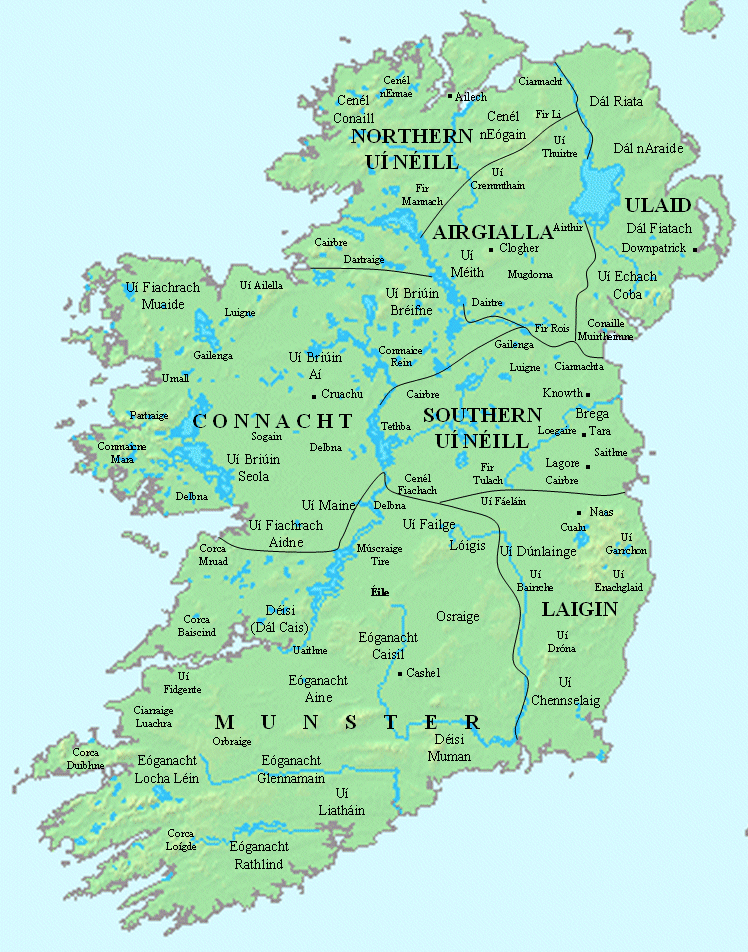
Ireland in the 8th century. The kingdom of Uisnech is not shown. It lies underneath the words "Southern Uí Néill".

Murchad mac Diarmato (died 715), called Murchad Midi (Murchad of Meath), was an Irish king. One of four or more sons of Diarmait Dian, he succeeded his father as King of Uisnech at the latter's death in 689.

== Life ==
The Kings of Uisnech ruled a kingdom centred in modern County Westmeath, named for Uisnech (also Ushnagh), the Hill of Uisneach, reputed to be the centre of Ireland. They belonged to Clann Cholmáin, a kin group descended from Colmán Már, son of Diarmait mac Cerbaill, and were counted among the southern branches of the Uí Néill. In the 7th century, the dominant kin group among the southern Uí Néill, who shared the title of High King of Ireland or King of Tara with the northern Cenél Conaill kindred, were the rival Síl nÁedo Sláine, whose lands lay in modern County Dublin and County Meath, to the east of Uisnech.

Murchad was among the guarantors of the Cáin Adomnáin (Law of Innocents) proclaimed at the Synod of Birr in 697. There are few reports of Murchad in the Irish annals. His brother Bodbchad was killed in the Battle of Claenath in 704, near Clane in modern County Kildare, fighting alongside Fogartach mac Néill against the King of Leinster, Cellach Cualann.

In 714 the annals record the Battle of Bile Tened between Clann Cholmáin, led by Murchad, and the Síl nÁedo Sláine near Moynalty. Murchad's brothers Áed and Colgu were killed in the first encounter. The opposition's Flann mac Áedo was killed in the second. Clann Cholmáin had an old feud with the Síl nDlúthaig sept of the Síl nÁedo Sláine, and Flann's father Áed mac Dlúthaig killed Murchad's father Diarmait in 689. On the same day of Battle of Bile Tened, the men of Meath won a battle over the Uí Fhailgi of Offaly and their king Forbassach Ua Congaile was slain.

Shortly afterwards the chief of Síl nÁedo Sláine, Fogartach mac Néill, was "expelled from the kingship and went to Britain". Some later sources say he was expelled by the High King Fergal mac Máele Dúin, and others say that he himself been High King. Fogartach was probably expelled from the kingship of the southern Uí Néill, and Murchad drove him from power.

== Death ==
Murchad was killed in 715 by Fogartach's uncle, the warlike Conall Grant. The Annals of Ulster and the Annals of Tigernach call him "king of the Uí Néill". This title is not common in the annals. It probably corresponds with the title "king of the North" (Rí in Tuaiscert) found attached to some northern Uí Néill who were not reckoned high kings and means that Murchad had acted as High King Fergal's deputy among the southern Uí Néill.

== Family ==
Murchad left at least two sons, Domnall Midi, who was later high king, and Coirpre, who died in 749. Bressal mac Murchado, killed in 764, may have been Murchad's son. (Bressal may have been Domnall Midi's grandson, through Domnall's son Murchad.) Domnall became king of Uisnech, but Fogartach returned from Britain in 716 and was clearly the chief king among the southern Uí Néill.
