= Cellach Cualann =

Cellach Cualann mac Gerthidi (died 715) was the last king of Leinster from the Uí Máil dynasty. Cellach's byname is derived from the land of Cualu which lay around Glendalough.

Cellach's father was not king of Leinster; his second cousin Fiannamail mac Máele Tuile (died 680) was. Cellach succeeded his cousin as king of Uí Máil when Fiannamail was murdered by a servant named Fochsechán, probably on the orders of Fínsnechta Fledach. The kingship of Leinster passed to the Uí Dúnlainge in the person of Bran Mut mac Conaill who died in 693, to be followed as king by Cellach.

== Reign ==
Immediately after the death of Bran Mut a battle between the Leinstermen and their western neighbours the kingdom of Osraige is recorded, but Cellach is not associated with this. Cellach was one of the guarantors of the Cáin Adomnáin (Law of Adomnán) in 697 promulgated at the Synod of Birr.

In 704 he warred with his northern neighbours, the Uí Néill of Clann Cholmáin, led by Bodbchath mac Diarmata Déin, and of Síl nÁedo Sláine, led by Fogartach mac Néill. The Battle of Claenath, fought near Clane in modern County Kildare, was a victory for Cellach, with Bodbchath killed and Fogartach fled. In 707 the Uí Néill High King of Ireland Congal Cennmagair campaigned in Leinster and obtained Cellach's submission to his authority.

In 709, aided by British allies—usually presumed to be mercenaries, exiled members of the warbands of the British kingdoms conquered by expansionist Northumbria—he fought a battle at Serg where his sons Fiachra and Fiannamail were killed. Serg is unidentified, Whitley Stokes translates it as "the battle of the Hunt". The Annals of Tigernach locate it somewhere in the fortuatha of Leinster, that part of the province east of the Wicklow Mountains. His adversaries are not named. Cellach's death in 715 is reported without comment by the Irish annals.

== Family ==
His first wife was Mugain ingen Failbe of Uí Bairrche. Their daughter Conchenn (died 743) married Murchad mac Brain Mut (died 727), his successor as king of Leinster. Mugain was also the mother of his sons Fiachra and Fianamail slain in 709.

Cellach's wife Bé Fáil, the third of four, was the daughter of Sechnassach, the High King of Ireland. Several of his sons died in his lifetime. His daughter Muirenn (died 748) was the mother of High King Cináed mac Írgalaig. His daughter Caintigern (Saint Kentigerna) was by his fourth wife, also Caintigern, daughter of Conaing Cuirre of the Síl nÁedo Sláine.

Of Cellach's surviving sons, Áed was killed in 719 near Fennor, County Kildare, Crimthann died in battle, "at an immature age" according to the Annals of Ulster in 726, and Eterscél in 727 fighting against Fáelán mac Murchado. His two grandsons Cathal and Ailill were slain in 744.
