= Sechnassach =

High King of Ireland

Sechnassach mac Blathmaic (died 671) followed his father Blathmac mac Áedo Sláine (died 665) and uncle Diarmait mac Áedo Sláine (died 665) as High King of Ireland and King of Brega. He belonged to the Síl nÁedo Sláine kindred of the southern Uí Néill, named for his grandfather Áed Sláine (died 604).

Sechnassach's father and uncle are said to have died in a great plague—the buide Chonaill—which struck Ireland from 664 or 665 onwards.

While the Baile Chuinn Cétchathaigh, compiled in the reign of Fínsnechta Fledach (died 695), does not include Sechnassach or his brother Cenn Fáelad (died 675) among its High Kings, the Chronicle of Ireland, on which other Irish annals were founded, named him as a High King on his death. The omission of Sechnassach and his brother Cenn Fáelad from this king list may be deliberate as it was compiled in the reign of Cenn Fáelad's killer Fínsnechta Fledach.

Sechnassach's marital alliances suggest that he had close relations with the kingdom of Leinster. His only recorded marriage was with one Findelb ingen Chellaig, who may have been a daughter of Cellach Cualann (died 715). His daughter, Bé Fáil (died 741), was in turn married to Cellach Cualann. Two other daughters of Sechnassach, Murgal and Mumain, are known, but no sons.

Little is recorded in the annals of Sechnassach's reign except his death. He was killed in November 671 by Dub Dúin, king of Cenél Coirpri, a minor Uí Néill kingdom on the upper reaches of the River Boyne near Clonard. His brother Cenn Fáelad became high king after him, probably in 672.

The Annals of the Four Masters record of him:

Full of bridles and horsewhips, was the house in which dwelt Seachnasach,
Many were the leavings of plunder in the house in which dwelt the son of Blathmac.

He has appeared in both the novels and short stories of Peter Tremayne's Sister Fidelma mysteries.
