= Conaing mac Flainn =

King of Brega in medieval Ireland

Conaing mac Flainn (died 849) was a King of Brega from the Uí Chonaing sept of Cnogba (Knowth) of the Síl nÁedo Sláine branch of the southern Ui Neill. He was the son of Flann mac Congalaig (died 812), a previous king. He ruled from 839 to 849.

The Uí Chonaing sept had conquered the lands of the Ciannachta (south of the Lower Boyne in modern County Meath) and were normally styled Kings of Ciannachta in this period. In 841 Conaing had a rival from his own kin Áed, son of Dúnchad, killed by his associates in his presence. At his death date in the annals he is styled rex Bregh – King of Brega – a title that had not been used in the annals since 771.

His sons Cináed mac Conaing (died 851) and Flann mac Conaing (died 868) were also Kings of Brega. His daughter Gormlaith ingen Conaing mac Flainn was the wife of Flann Sinna (died 916).
