= Flann mac Congalaig =

Flann mac Congalaig (died 812) was a King of Brega from the Uí Chonaing sept of Cnogba (Knowth) of the Síl nÁedo Sláine branch of the southern Ui Neill. He was the son of Congalach mac Conaing (died 778), a previous king. He ruled from 786 to 812.

The Síl nÁedo Sláine had suffered a crushing defeat in 786 at the hands of Donnchad Midi (died 797), the high king from the rival Clann Cholmáin. In 795 Flann killed Donnchad's son Conn in the house of a certain Cumalcaich at a feast. Of the death of Conn was said:

A feast was made by Ua Olcain, which was partaken of in odious ale; dregs were given to him by Flann, so that he bore away his head after his death.

At his death obit in the year 812 he is called King of Ciannachta- (rex Ciannachtai). His son Conaing mac Flainn (died 849) was also a King of Brega.
