= Conaille Muirtheimne =

Cruithin kingdom in Ireland

Conaille Muirthemne was a Cruithin kingdom located in County Louth, Ireland, from before 688 to after 1107 approximately.

== Overview ==
The Ulaid according to historian Francis John Byrne 'possibly still ruled directly in Louth as far as the Boyne in the early seventh century' at a time when Congal Cáech of the Cruthin of Dál nAraidi made a bid for the kingship of Tara.

Conaille Muirtheimne once formed part of the over-kingdom of the Ulaid, and it remained an ally of it for the greater part of its history. In Lebor na gCeart (the Book of Rights) the Conaille are listed among "The Territories whose King paid Tribute to the Ulaidh." In return, the king of Ulaid owed to "The Heroic King of Muirthemhne – six round goblets full of ale, ten ships from the Hero of Elga, ten steeds and ten brights cloaks."

Medieval genealogists believed them to be a branch of the Cruthin. Dubhaltach MacFhirbhisigh stated of them: "To the Cruithne of Ireland belong the Dal Araidhe, the seven Laighsi of Leinster, the seven Soghain of Éire, and every Conaill of Eirinn." Eoin MacNeill held the Conaille Muirtheimne to be kin of Ulaid and Érainn, descending from Conall Anglonnach, a son of Dedu mac Sin (MacNeill, pp. 97–8). Their association with the Cruthin appears to be the end result of a series of later inventions.

The Conaille occupied the district of Magh Muirthemne, also known as Machaire Conaill, and Cúalnge closely associated with two mythological heroes of the Ulaid, Cú Chulainn and Conall Cernach, renowned defenders of the province of Ulster. Unusually for a character from the Ulster Cycle, Conall appears to have been taken on in medieval Irish genealogies by the Cruithne as an ancestor in the 7th century including by the kings of the Dál nAraidi and the Uí Echach Cobo. By tradition the forest and lands of Conall Cernach ran from the area of Newry to the Boyne at Tuath Inbir and Tráig Indbir Colpa. Though the Conaille Muitheimne never extended that far south in the 7th-century, as Ferrard was then occupied by the Árd Ciannachta, they represent pseudo-historical claims by the Cruithne through Conall Cernach.

For much of its history it was at war with the Airgíalla and the Uí Néill; sometimes even with its Ulaidh allies. The first member of the dynasty to occur in the sources is Dícuill mac Ossénié who is referred to as rex in Vita S. Romani. He was of the generation before the king killed at the Battle of Imlech Pich in 688.

In either 732 or 735, the Ulaid suffered a heavy defeat at the hands of the Cenél nEógain led by Áed Allán in the battle of Fochart in Magh Muirthemne, which saw the king of Ulaid, Áed Róin, decapitated. As a result, the Cenél nEógain brought Conaille Muirthemne under their suzerainty.

The last recorded king of Conaille Muirthemhne died in 1081, yet in 1107 Fergus, son of the King of Conaille, was killed in battle by the Uí Breasil Macha", so it seems the kingdom still retained independence. However, the Airgíalla seem to have brought it under their control sometime after this, most probably c. 1130 by Donnchad Ua Cerbaill, king of Airgialla, and it was incorporated into his kingdom. He settled elements of the Uí Méith, an Airgialla tribe, on the Conaille of Cuailgne, on the south side of Carlingford Lough which gave their name to the district of Omeath. In 1153 it is recorded that High King Domhnall Mac Lochlainn " ... plundered ... and burned Conaille."

Possible surnames derived from this group include Connolly.

== Geographical description of the kingdom ==
This description of Conaille Muirtheimne is taken from the article cited below:

"Until it fell under the control of the O'Carrols in the twelfth century, what is now County Louth was divided between three minor kingdoms. In the south lay that of Fir Arda Ciannacht (whence Ferrard); ... In the east and centre of the present county was the Airgiallan kingdom of Fir Roise, and in the north was that of the Conaille Muirtheimne ... The territory of Conaille Muirtheimne was associated with Mag Muirtheimne, 'the Plain of Muirtheimne' ...the core area of the kingdom appears to have been roughly equivalent to the barony of Dundalk Upper plus the parish of Dromiskin. The regions to the south-west (Louth) and north-east (Cuailgne), i.e., Cooley, were of uncertain or perhaps fluctuating status."

== Kings of Conaille Muirtheimne 688–1107 ==
See

Kings following rex Dícuill mac Ossénié.

1. Uarcraide mac Dícuill mac Osseni, d. 688, ally of Congalach, king of Brega and Dub dá Inber, king of Ard Ciannachta, killed at the battle of Imlech Pich, which effectively divided Brega in two.
2. Amalgaid mac Cathasaig, d. 741,
3. Fagall (Fallach) Finn mac Oengusa, d. 743
4. Foidmenn mac Fallaig/Fallomain, d. 752
5. Uargal (Uargalach mac Uachtbrain mac Uarcraide), grandson of Uarcraide, d. 765
6. Sluagadach mac Uargalaig, fourth son of Uargal, d. 789
7. Fiachain, d. 792
8. Spelan mac Sluagadaig, d. 824
9. Mael Brigte mac Spelain, d. 869; he and his brother Canannán were taken captive by the Vikings in 831; possibly he retired before 850.
10. Gairbith mac Mail Brigte, first son of Mael Brigte, d. 878, decapitated by Uí Echach
11. Ciblechan mac Mail Brigte, second son of Mael Brigte, d. 890
12. Mael Morda mac Gairbitha, first son of Gairbith, d. 891, decapitated by Cellach mac Flannicáin
13. Conglach mac Gairbitha, fourth son of Gairbith, d. 913; in 912 he had killed the son Gairbith of Mael Morda but the next year he was killed by his brother Dommnall
14. Dommnall mac Gairbitha, fifth son of Gairbith, d. 914
15. Mael Brigte mac Ciblechain, d. 914 in battle
16. Spelan mac Congalaig, probably son of Conglach mac Gairbitha, d. 923, killed by treachery and perhaps by his own people
17. Crongilla mac Cuilennain, d. 937, is the first son of the third son Cuilennain of Mael Brigte
18. Mac Etig mac Cuilennain, d. 951 is the third son of Cuilennain mac Mael Brigte
19. Cinaed mac Crongilla, d. 970, son of Crongilla mac Cuilennain
20. Congalach mac Meic Etig, d. 988, son of Mac Etig mac Cuilennain
21. Matudan mac Cinaeda, d. 996, son of Cinaed mac Crongilla
22. Gilla Crist ua Cuilennain, d. 999, probably son of Mac Etig mac Cuilennain
23. Muiredach, d. 1005, son of Congalach mac Meic Etig
24. In Gercce, d. 1005; either he is the son of Muiredach, or we have a single person Muiredach In Gercc mac Congalaig
25. Crinan mac Gormlada, d. 1012
26. Cinaed mac In Geircce, d. 1029, son of (Muiredach) In Gercc mac Congalaig
27. Domnall mac Gilla Christ, d. 1052; he is not the grandson of Cuilennain but descends by the line of the last son, Mail Forthardaig, of Cuilennain mac Mael Brigte
28. Cinaed mac meic Odormaic, d. 1066
29. Mac Ui Threodain, d. 1078
30. Mac In Geircce, d. 1081, either a son of (Muiredach) In Gercc mac Congalaig or another descendant of Muiredach
31. Unnamed King of Conaille, alive 1107.

== See also ==
- Irish kings
- Irish royal families
