= Fergus mac Fogartaig =

King of South Brega

Fergus mac Fogartaig (died 751) (or Fergal) was King of South Brega of the Uí Chernaig sept of Lagore of the Síl nÁedo Sláine branch of the southern Ui Neill. He was the son of the high king Fogartach mac Néill (died 724). He ruled from 738 to 751.

The annals do not mention any events regarding him other than his death obit. His death obit, though, in the Annals of Ulster has significance as the first time the title King of Southern Brega (regis Deisceird Breg) is used.

His sons included Máel Dúin mac Fergusa (died 785) and Cernach mac Fergusa (died 805), both called Kings of Loch Gabor as well as Ailill mac Fergusa (died 800), styled King of South Brega.

== See also ==
- Kings of Brega
