= Fergal mac Máele Dúin =

High King of Ireland (died 722)

Fergal mac Máele Dúin (died 11 December 722) was High King of Ireland. Fergal belonged to the Cenél nEógain sept of the northern Uí Néill. He was the son of Máel Dúin mac Máele Fithrich (died 681), a King of Ailech, and great-grandson of the high king Áed Uaridnach (died 612). He belonged to the Cenél maic Ercae branch of the Cenél nEógain and was King of Ailech from 700 to 722.

As King of Ailech Fergal participated in a victory over the men of Connacht in 707 where their king Indrechtach mac Dúnchado was slain. This was in revenge for the defeat and death of the high king Loingsech mac Óengusso in 703 at the Battle of Corann. Loingsech's son Fergal mac Loingsig was one of the participants.

Fergal became High King in 710, on the death of Congal Cendmagair of the Cenél Conaill. He ruled from 710 to 722.

The Cenél nEógain were expanding eastwards into Airgialla territory. In 711 Fergal mac Máele Dúin fought the Battle of Sliab Fuait (in the Fews, modern County Armagh) where the king of Uí Méith, Tnúthach son of Mochloinges, and Cú Raí mac Áedo of the Fir Cúl sept of the Síl nÁedo Sláine of Brega were slain. Hostility to the Síl nÁedo Sláine was evidenced by the expulsion of Fogartach mac Néill (died 724) from the kingship of Brega in 714 who went into exile in Britain. This appears to be the work of Fergalin in conjunction with Murchad Midi (died 715) the King of Uisnech of Clann Cholmáin and Murchad may have been Fergal's deputy ruler in the south.

Fogartach's uncle Conall Grant (died 718) killed Murchad the following year and Fogartach returned in 716. In 717 Fogartach caused some manner of disturbance at the Óenach Tailten—an annual Uí Néill gathering held at Teltown—where two men were killed. Then in 718 Conall Grant won a victory over a coalition of southern Ui Neill kings at the Battle of Cenannas (near Kells) as part of the internal feuds of the Síl nÁedo Sláine. In frustration, Fergal intervened and had Conall killed two months later. This seems to have settled affairs among the southern Uí Néill.

In 719 Fergal began to impose his authority on Leinster and harrying expeditions are recorded. In 721 Cathal mac Finguine, king of Munster (died 742) and Murchad mac Brain Mut (died 727), king of Leinster attacked the lands of the southern Uí Néill and ravaged the plain of Brega. Later that year, Fergal retaliated against Leinster; he invaded and ravaged until the cattle-tribute was accepted and took hostages from the Laigin. A truce was made with Cathal as well. The Leinstermen broke the truce however, and Fergal retaliated by invading again in 722 with a large hosting of both northern and southern Uí Néill forces and their Airgíalla allies. However, on 11 December 722 Fergal and numerous nobles of the Uí Néill were slain at the disastrous Battle of Allen (modern County Kildare) by the Leinstermen. The battle was preserved in the 10th century saga Cath Almaine.

According to the saga Fáistine Fergaile meic Máele Dúin ("Fergal mac Máele Dúin's Prophecy") his son Áed Allán was born by a daughter of the high king Congal Cendmagair in an illicit union while the mother of his son Niall Frossach was of the Ciannachta. Both his sons Áed Allán and Niall Frossach were both later High Kings. Fergal was succeeded as High King by Fogartach mac Néill of the Síl nÁedo Sláine sept of the southern Uí Néill. His son Áed Allán succeeded him as King of Ailech and chief of the Cenél nEógain.

Preceded by Fland mac Máele Tuile	King of Ailech; 700–722	Succeeded by Áed Allán
