= Ailill Cruitire =

Ailill Cruitire mac Áedo Sláine (died 634) was a King of Brega from the Síl nÁedo Sláine branch of the southern Ui Neill. He was the son of the high king Áed Sláine mac Diarmato (died 604). His byname meant "harper".

The exact date of his accession to Brega is not mentioned in the annals. He was contemporary to his brother Congal mac Áedo Sláine, who was called King of Brega in the annals, whereas Ailill was not.

The annals mention that in 634 Ailill and his brother Congal were defeated and slain at the Battle of Loch Trethin at Fremainn (Loch Drethin at Frewin Hill, County Westmeath) by the same Conall Guthbinn of the Clann Cholmáin who had slain their father. Congal is recorded as king of Brega in the annals regarding this event, Ailill is not.

A poem in the Book of Leinster, however, claims that Ailill was slain at the Battle of Áth Goan in western Liffey during a Leinster civil war in 633. The victor was again Conall Guthbinn and his ally Fáelán mac Colmáin (died 666?) of the Uí Dúnlainge.

Ailill's son Dlúthach was ancestor of the Síl nDlúthaig sept, or as Fir Cúl Breg, men of the churches of Brega. His grandson Áed mac Dlúthaig (died 701) was a king of Fir Cúl.

== See also ==
- Kings of Brega
