= Cernach =

Cernach is a given name which may refer to:

- Saint Cernach, 6th-century Welsh saint, abbot and confessor
- Cernach mac Congalaig (died 818), an Irish king of Brega
- Cernach mac Fergusa (died 805), a king in southern Brega
- Cernach mac Fogartaig (died 738), a king in southern Brega

== See also ==
- Conall Cernach, a hero in Irish mythology
