= Írgalach mac Conaing =

Írgalach mac Conaing Cuirre (died 702), also called Írgalach ua Conaing, was a King of Brega from the Uí Chonaing sept of Cnogba (Knowth) of the Síl nÁedo Sláine branch of the southern Ui Neill. He was the son of Conaing Cuirre mac Congaile (died 662) and brother of Congalach mac Conaing Cuirre (died 696), previous kings of Brega. He ruled from 696 to 702.

Írgalach is listed as one of the guarantors of the Cáin Adomnáin ("Law of the Innocents") of Saint Adomnán arranged at the Synod of Birr in 697 where he is called King of Ciannachta.

Írgalach's reign began an intense rivalry between the Uí Chonaing and Uí Chernaig sept of Lagore in south Brega of the Síl nÁedo Sláine. His brother Congalach had been defeated by Niall mac Cernaig Sotal (died 701) of this sept at the Battle of Imlech Pich in 688. In 701, Irgalach killed Niall, who was under Adomnán's protection, at Drumain Ua Casan. The Fragmentary Annals of Ireland give the story of the curse the saint laid upon Irgalach for this act:

"Cursed son," said he, "hardest and worst man of God's making, know that shortly you will be separated from your sovereignty, and you will go to Hell."

According to the account in the Fragmentary Annals Adomnán also cursed Írgalach's descendants. His wife Muirenn (died 748), daughter of Cellach Cualann (died 715), the Uí Máil king of Leinster was pregnant and begged Adomnán to spare her unborn child. This he did, in part, but her child, Cináed mac Írgalaig, later High King of Ireland, was born half-blind, from which he derived his byname Cináed Cáech. {Cinaed died 728-defeated and killed at the battle of Druim Corcainn (or Druim Ciarain, the place is unidentified) by Flaithbertach mac Loingsig of the northern Cenél Conaill}. The Annals of Ulster record that Írgalach met his death the next year in 702 when invading Britons slew him on the coast opposite Inis Mac Nesáin (Ireland's Eye), and the Fragmentary Annals link this with Adomnán's curse.

Joan Radner, translator of the Fragmentary Annals, notes that while the deaths of Niall and Írgalach, and Cináed's blindness, are all attested by the Irish annals, the remainder of the account is of unknown reliability and "the legend fits into the cracks between annal entries".
