= Muiredach mac Domnaill Midi =

Muiredach mac Domnaill Midi (died 802) was a King of Uisnech in Mide of the Clann Cholmáin. He was the son of the High King of Ireland, Domnall Midi (died 763) and brother of the high king Donnchad Midi (died 797). He ruled in as King of Mide from 799 to 802.

The period between the death of Donnchad Midi and the accession of his son Conchobar mac Donnchado in 803 was a time of civil strife and confusion amongst the Clann Cholmáin. Apparently Donnchad was succeeded by his son Domnall mac Donnchada Midi in 797. That same year the high king Áed Oirdnide of the Cenél nEógain invaded Meath and defeated Clann Cholmáin at the Battle of Druim Ríg. In this battle were slain two of Muiredach's brothers, Fínnechta and Diarmait Odar. Áed went on to devastate Meath which submitted to him and the beginning of his high kingship is considered to have occurred from that point on.

In 799 Domnall mac Donnchada Midi was assassinated by his own kinsmen and Muiredach became King of Mide. Muiredach first appears in 799 as leading the forces of Mide in a victory over the Cenél Cairpri of Tethba at the Battle of Finnabair in Tethba in which the king of the Cenél Cairpri was slain. He may have been acting in the interest of his nephew Domnall as the Annals of Ulster place this event before Domnall's assassination. However, the Annals of the Four Masters place this even after Domnall's assassination and so Muiredach may have been imposing his own authority.

At his death notice in the annals in 802 he is definitively named as King of Mide.
