= Congalach mac Conaing Cuirre =

Congalach mac Conaing Cuirre (died 696) was a King of Brega from the Uí Chonaing sept of the Síl nÁedo Sláine branch of the southern Uí Néill. He was the son of Conaing Cuirre mac Congaile (died 66), a previous king of Brega. The territory of Brega that he ruled was called Cnogba (Knowth) or North Brega which he ruled from 662 to 696. He was king of all Brega from 695 to 696.

The Síl nÁedo Sláine dominated the midlands in this period and began to engage in internecine strife among its various lineages. Congalach's first mention in the annals is in 688 when he was defeated at the Battle of Imlech Pich by Niall mac Cernaig Sotal of the Uí Chernaig sept of Lagore in south Brega. Congalach survived the battle but his allies Dub dá Inber, king of Ard Ciannachta, and Uarchride Ua Oissíne, of the Conaille Muirtheimne, were slain. According to the Fragmentary Annals of Ireland, the Ciannachta tribe came under foreign rule and were deprived of sovereignty as a result.

In 695, Congalach and his kinsman Áed mac Dlúthaig of the Síl nDlúthaig of Fir Cúl Breg killed Fínsnechta Fledach, the High King of Ireland, and his son Bresal of the Clan Fínsnechtai sept at Grellaigh Dollaith. According to the Annals of Tigernach, this occurred in battle, but the Fragmentary Annals of Ireland state that Finsnechta was murdered in a tent by Congalach and Áed. Congalach now became ruler of Brega.

The record in Annals of Ulster may show that Congalach was a candidate for the high kingship after the killing of Fínsnechta, in competition with Loingsech mac Óengusso of the northern Uí Néill kindred of Cenél Conaill. It is not until after Congalach's death that the annal, probably based on a contemporaneous chronicle kept on Iona, announces the beginning of Loingsech's reign.

Congalach's son Amalgaid mac Congalaig (died 718) was also King of Brega. Another son was Fergal mac Congalaig (died 718). They were both slain at the Battle of Cenannas (near Kells) by the Uí Chernaig sept. Another son Suibne mac Congalaig (died 722) was slain at the Battle of Allen where the Ui Neill were crushed by the men of Leinster.
