= Dúngal mac Amalgado =

Dúngal mac Amalgado (or Dúngal Cnogba) (died 759) was a King of Brega from the Uí Chonaing sept of Cnogba (Knowth) of the Síl nÁedo Sláine branch of the southern Ui Neill. He was the son of Amalgaid mac Congalaig (died 718) and brother of Conaing mac Amalgado (died 742), previous kings. He ruled from 748 to 759.

The Uí Chonaing had conquered the Ciannachta tribe of Brega, between the Boyne and the Delvin, in the reign of Cináed mac Írgalaig (died 728). However a section of them remained called the Ard Ciannachta between the Boyne and the Dee. In 749 Dúngal won the battle of Ard Ciannachta versus this tribe and their chief, Ailill mac Duib dá Crích, was slain. The Annals of Ulster state that Aillil was slain in the first attack but in a counter-attack Domnall mac Cináeda of the Uí Chonaing was slain. They call Domnall king and do not associate Dúngal with the battle. The Annals of Tigernach make the same statements regarding the fortunes of the battle and Domnall's title but claim that Dúngal was victor.

In 759 Dúngal fought the Battle of Emain Macha against Fiachnae mac Áedo Róin (died 789), King of Ulaid. He was defeated and slain along with his ally Donn Bó mac Con Brettan, king of Fir Rois. The Annals of Tigernach claim that the cause of the battle was a feud within the abbacy of Armagh. Dúngal took the side of a priest named Airechtach versus the abbot Fer-dá-Chrích who was supported by Fiachnae.

His son Conaing mac Dúngaile (died 786) was slain at the Battle of Lia Finn or Tuilén.

== See also ==
- Kings of Brega
