= Conaing mac Amalgado =

Conaing mac Amalgado (died 742) was a King of Brega from the Uí Chonaing sept of Cnogba (Knowth) of the Síl nÁedo Sláine branch of the southern Ui Neill. He was the son of Amalgaid mac Congalaig (died 718), a previous king. He ruled from 728 to 742.

The Síl nÁedo Sláine were involved in infighting in this period with rivalry between the Uí Chonaing sept and the Uí Chernaig sept of South Brega. Conaing's father Amalgaid had been slain in the Battle of Cenannas (near Kells) versus Conall Grant mac Cernaig (died 718) of the rival sept. The annals record the killing of Cathal mac Néill of the Uí Chernaig in 729 but do not mention the circumstances. In 737 the Battle of Lía Ailbe in Mag nAilbe (Moynalvy, Co. Meath) was fought between the two septs, Conaing was victorious and Cathal mac Áeda and Cernach mac Fogartaig of the rival sept were defeated with Cathal slain. In 738 Cernach was killed by his own adherents.

In 742 Conaing was strangled. The Annals of Tigernach claim the deed was done by the high king Áed Allán (died 743) of the Cenél nEógain. He is referred to as King of Ciannachta (regis Ciannachte) in his death obit.

Conaing's sons Congalach mac Conaing (died 778) and Diarmait mac Conaing (died 786) were also Kings of Brega.

== See also ==
- Kings of Brega
