= Conaing Cuirre =

Conaing mac Congaile (died 662), called Conaing Cuirre, was a King of Brega from the Síl nÁedo Sláine branch of the southern Ui Neill. He was the son of Congal mac Áedo Sláine (died 634), a previous king of Brega. The territory of Brega that he ruled was called Cnogba (Knowth) or North Brega which he ruled from 634 to 662.

He ruled during a time when his uncles Diarmait mac Áedo Sláine (died 665) and Blathmac mac Áedo Sláine (died 665) were jointly High King of Ireland. The annals record a battle between Blathmac and the adherents of Diarmait at the Battle of Ogomain in 662. Conaing was slain fighting on the side of Blathmac in this civil war. His allies, Ultán son of Ernaine, chief of Ciannachta, and Cenn Fáelad son of Gerthide, chief of Ciannachta Arda were also slain.

His descendants ruling at Cnogba were known as the Uí Chonaing. His sons Congalach mac Conaing Cuirre (died 696) and Irgalach mac Conaing (died 702) were also kings of Brega. Irgalach's son Cináed (died 728) was late High King of Ireland, the penultimate Uí Chonaing High King, the last being Congalach Cnogba in the 10th century. His daughter Caintigern married Cellach Cualann (died 715), the Uí Máil king of Leinster and was mother of Saint Kentigerna.

== See also ==
- Kings of Brega
