= Ciannachta =

Population group of early historic Ireland

The Ciannachta were a population group of early historic Ireland. They claimed descent from the legendary figure Tadc mac Céin. Modern research indicates Saint Cianán and his followers may have been the origin behind the tribal name as it is a late construction similar in form to Eóganachta and Connachta. They first appear in historical sources in the 6th century, and were found in several parts of the island, including in Brega and Airgialla. The Ciannachta groups were absorbed over time. Modern descendants (mostly surnamed O'Carroll) have formed a Clan Cian society (headquartered in the United States).

== Background ==
The Ciannachta claimed descend from Tadc mac Céin, a member of "the possibly legendary early Munster dynasty, who was said to be a grandson of Ailill Aulom. Tadc was also the putative ancestor of Luigni and Gailenga—peoples which were located in a number of centres in the midlands and the west of Ireland". The acquisition, by Tadc, of the territory held by his descendants in Brega is related in the possibly late-9th-century saga, Cath Crinna.

The fortunes of the historical Ciannachta can to an extent be traced via the Irish annals. Ciannachta Breg occupied the coastal area between Annagassan and Dublin. They are first recorded sub anno 535 when they were defeated in battle at Luachair Mór (between the rivers Nanny and Boyne), near Duleek, by Túathal Máelgarb.

The Ciannachta kept their independence into the 9th century. A devastating seaborne attack by Ecgfrith of Northumbria in June 684, which resulted in the seizing of a large number of slaves and the sacking of many churches and monasteries in Brega, was followed in 688 by the battle of Imblech Pich (Emlach, near Kells) an important defeat, inflicted upon them by King Niall mac Cernaigh, king of Brega. After this, they lost their independence south of the Boyne and north of the Nanny Water, and from this point on were referred to as Ard Ciannachta, reflecting their loss of territory in south-east Brega.

The area taken over became important to the Síl nÁedo Sláine and included both Duleek and the place called Cerne, Cernae or Cerna, noted as the principal burial site for the men of east Midhe and Brega (Cernoi nominatur, al. Cernai .i. coernia daiġ is ann atá primreilec Airthir Midi ocus Breaġ), near to the townlands of Carnes. This included both síd Cerna and Cnoc Cerna, the hill of Cerna, noted in the Metrical Dindshenchus as holding the bodies of the sons and grandsons of Áed Slaine. These were located at the western end of Bellewstown ridge to the south of Duleek close to the famous Lia Ailbhe, the standing stone described as 'the chief monument of Brega' (príomh-dindgnai Maighi Bregh) in 999, when it fell and was made into four millstones by Máelaschlainn the high king". Tírechán's Collectanea lists the church of Cerne amongst those churches founded by St. Patrick in Mag Breg. In this church he states was buried Ercc, "who suffered (?) a great plague".

In 742 the Síl nÁedo Sláine king of North Brega, Conaing mac Amalgado, began using the title king of Ciannachta, the first of seven North Brega kings to do so. In time, the Uí Chonaing conquered and assimilated it into Brega, while retaining use of the title for themselves.

Byrne remarks:

Following the death of Cellach (786), the indigenous Ciannachta never again attained the kingship of their own territory and their political ambitions seem to have been entirely focused on the kingdom of Fir Arda Ciannachta ... The political eclipse of Ciannachta Breg from mid-8th century onwards may have resulted in members of that dynasty transferring their ambitions to the ecclesiastical sphere where one of their kindred, Conmael ua Loichene, took the abbacy of the same church [ Monasterboice ] in 733. Another member of the Ciannachta Breg, Ioseph ua Cernae, acceded to the abbacy of the same church in 790 ... Flann Mainistrech ... who died in 1056 is name in the Ciannachta Breg pedigree, as is his son, Echthigern ... who died in 1067.

== Locations ==
Branches of the Ciannachta included:

- Ciannachta Breg – found in Brega (between the Liffey and the Boyne), later conquered by the Síl nÁedo Sláine
- Cianachta Glenn Geimin – now the barony of Keenaght in County Londonderry
- Ard Ciannachta – barony of Ferrard, County Louth (see Conaille Muirtheimne) but also Meath south of the Nanny River and part of north county Dublin.

== Origin of the name ==
Admitting that there are significant questions surrounding the tribal name Ciannachta, David Sproule points out that the -acht suffix was used to form only three population-group names in early Ireland, namely the Connachta, Eoganachta and Ciannachta. He states that,

originally there was one powerful people whose name had that suffix and ... the other two names were formed and adopted in imitation of the first by peoples who wished to emulate them. The original can only have been the Connachta, whose power, position and prestige in the earliest part of the historical period are unquestionable and who loom large in prehistory as the traditional enemies of the Ulaid.

It does not seem that the word "Connacht" can originally have meant 'the descendants of Conn'; it may have meant 'headship' or 'supremacy' from "cond" or "conn", head, and later have been interpreted as meaning "the descendants of Conn", Conn Cetchathach being derived from the word "Connacht" rather than vice versa. ... the name "Eoganacht" and "Ciannacht" were formed in imitation ...

Paul Byrne accepts this hypothesis, proposing the "conjecture that the source of the tribal name was the patron saint of the Ciannachta Breg, Cianan, the founder of Duleek. ... Cianan is, of course, a diminutive form of "Cian." Thus, the name Ciannachta may have been a combination of "Cian" and the suffix "-acht." One may surmise that an ambitious tribe (or grouping of tribes) of relatively insignificant origin based near the church of Duleek—possibly lay tenants of the monastery—decided to forge a new identity based on their adherence to the local founder. Thus they became the "Ciannachta"—'the people of St Cianan.' fortuitously, the ancestor figure of their neighbours Gailenga and Luigni—Cian mac Ailella Auluimm—would have provided a suitably named ancestor figure when they later sought to construct a new pedigree for themselves." The townland of Keenoge south of Duleek may indicate a place of origin.

Cianan was regarded as a very significant figure in very early Irish Christianity, his church at Duleek traditionally stated as the first stone church in Ireland. Cianan himself is reported in the Annals of Ulster as dying in 489, four years before Saint Patrick. No life is extant, but various anecdotes survive, particularly in the medieval commentary on the martyrology Félire Óengusso.

The territorial extent of Ciannachta Breg prior to its conquest is uncertain, but believed to have been reasonably large.

== Kings of Ciannachta ==
- Cronan mac Tigernaich – king of Ciannachta in 571, he killed the joint high-kings Baetan mac Muirchertaich and Eochaid mac Domnaill mac Muirchertaich of the Cenel nEoghain. The Annals of Ulster incorrectly refer to him as of Glinne Gaimen, whereas he was of the Ciannachta Breg.
- Gerthide – probably son of the above, king in 594, defeated at the battle of Eudunn Mor in Ciannacht Breg
- Cenn Faelad mac Gerthide – son of the above, referred to as the king of Ard Ciannacht in 662. Apparently killed at the battle of Oghamain in that year
- Ultan mac Eraine – styled king of the Ciannachta, killed at Oghamain in 662
- Mael Fuataich mac Eraine – brother of above, also styled king, died 662
- Doir mac Mael Duib – styled king of the Ciannachta, fl. 674
- Dub da Inber – styled king of Ardda Ciannachta in the Annals of Ulster in 688
- Dub da Chrich – died in 722, apparently king of Ard Ciannachta
- Ailill mac Cinn Fáelad – died 702. Had sons Eodus and Oengus, both kings.
- Oengus mac Ailillo – king of Ard Ciannachta in 737
- Ailill mac Duib da Chrich – a descendant of Cenn Faelad, apparently king of Ard Ciannachta at his death in 749
- Cellach mac Cormac mac Aiillo – king of Ard Ciannachta, died 786
- Muiredach – king of Ard Ciannachta, died 855. His son, Tigernach mac Muiredach, is described as episcopus, princepas Droma Inasclainn (bishop, head of Dromiskin) on his death in 879.

== Other kings ==
- 974 – Tadhg Ua Ruadhrach, lord of Cianachta, was slain in Ulidia.
