= Conall Grant =

King of Brega in 7th/8th century Ireland

Conall Grant mac Cernaig (died 718) was a King of Brega of the Uí Chernaig sept of Lagore of the Síl nÁedo Sláine. He was the grandson of the high king Diarmait mac Áedo Sláine (died 665). His father Cernach Sotal had died during plague years in 664. His byname Grant meant "Grey-haired"

== Biography ==
In his time there was a rivalry between the northern septs of the Síl nÁedo Sláine, including the Uí Chonaing sept of Cnogba (Knowth) and the Síl nDlúthaig of Fir Cúl, with the southern sept of the Uí Chernaig. Conall's brother Niall mac Cernaig Sotal had been killed by the Uí Chonaing king of Brega, Írgalach mac Conaing Cuirre (died 702) The kingship of Brega at this time was in rivalry between the septs. Two contemporaries were also considered kings of Brega around this time, Amalgaid mac Congalaig (died 718) of the Uí Chonaing, and Conall Grant's nephew, Fogartach mac Néill (died 724).

Conall is among the guarantors of the Cáin Adomnáin (Law of Innocents) proclaimed at the Synod of Birr in 697 where he is given the title King of Deiscirt Breg or southern Brega. These titles were added to the list of guarantors in 727 and the first use of the title King of South Brega in the Annals of Ulster is not until 751

In 712, his nephew Maine mac Néill was slain in battle versus Flann mac Áedo (died 714) of the Síl nDlúthaig. In 714, his nephew Fogartach was deposed from the kingship and went to Britain possibly by the high king Fergal mac Máele Dúin (died 722) of the Cenél nEógain. Conall may have acquired the rule of Brega and in 715 he was responsible for the assassination of Murchad Midi, the King of Uisnech from the Clann Cholmáin, possibly the deputy of Fergal. His nephew Fogartach returned to the rule of Brega in 716.

Then, in 718 Conall fought the Battle of Cenannas (near Kells) and defeated and slew Amalgaid of Cnogba and his brother Fergal, along with their allies, Gormgal mac Áedo of Síl nDlúthaig and Tuathal Ua Fáelchon of Clann Cholmáin Bicc. The high king Fergal intervened and had Conall killed two months later.

The descendants of Conall known as the Síl Conaill Graint based at Calatruim developed a rivalry with the descendants of his brother Niall, the main Uí Chernaig line at Lagore, within the southern Brega septs of Síl nÁedo Sláine. Conall's son Niall mac Conaill Graint (died 778) was a King of Southern Brega. Another son, Ailill mac Conaill Graint (died 722) was slain at the Battle of Allen where the men of Leinster defeated the Ui Neill.

== See also ==
- Kings of Brega
