= Fínsnechta Fledach =

High King of Ireland (died 695)

Fínsnechta Fledach mac Dúnchada (died 695) was High King of Ireland. Fínsnechta belonged to the southern Síl nÁedo Sláine sept of the Uí Néill and was King of Brega, in modern County Meath, Ireland. He was a grandson of Áed Sláine. His father Dúnchad had died in 659. His byname "Fledach" meant "the bountiful" or "the festive".

== High King ==
He became King of Brega and High King in 675, after killing his predecessor, and first cousin, Cenn Fáelad in battle at Aircheltra, a place which is not identified. The Fragmentary Annals of Ireland relate how Finsnechta won support by his generosity. Among those he won over were the king of Fir Rois and Saint Adomnán. According to this annal, he had been granted a stewardship by Cenn Fáelad, but was unsatisfied with this and, encouraged by his friend of Fir Rois, challenged Cenn Faelad to battle and won the kingship.

He appears to have faced resistance from the King of Leinster, and a Battle of Loch Gabor (Lagore) was fought in 677. There was mutual slaughter on both sides but Finsnechta emerged the victor. In 680, Finsnechta had the King of Leinster, Fiannamail mac Máele Tuile, assassinated.

Finsnechta was involved in the north as well. In 676, he destroyed Ailech, center of Cenél nEógain power. He fought Bécc Bairrche mac Blathmaic (d. 718), King of Ulster, in 679 at the Battle of Tailtiu.

In June 684, Ecgfrith, the King of Northumbria, sent an army under Berht to Ireland which laid waste to the plain of Brega, the heart of Fínsnechta's kingdom. The reasons the army was sent are still not fully understood. The hostages taken in the raid were later returned through the offices of Adomnán in 687.

According to the saga Bóroma ("The Cattle Tribute"), it is mentioned that Fínsnechta Fledach undertook an expedition against Leinster when the Laigin refused to pay the cattle tribute. The Leinster king Bran Mut mac Conaill (died 693) assembled the Leinster forces and sent Saint Moling (d. 697), the abbot of Ferns, to negotiate with Fínsnechta. Mo-Ling tricked Fínsnechta into remitting the tribute. As a result, Saint Adomnan grew angry with the high king and cursed saying that his descendants would have no fame. Fínsnechta did penance to Adomnan and was forgiven for remitting the Boruma.

== Temporary abdication and death ==
In 688, Fínsnechta abdicated to become a monk, but he left the clerical life and resumed the kingship in 689. This return to power may have been a result of the break-out of a civil war among the Síl nÁedo Sláine when Niall mac Cernaig Sotal (died 701) of the Uí Chernaig sept of south Brega defeated Congalach mac Conaing Cuirre (died 696) of north Brega at the Battle of Imlech Pich in 688. Also, Áed mac Dlúthaig (died 701) of the Síl nDlúthaig sept killed Diarmait Dian mac Airmetaig Cáech, the King of Uisnech, of the Clann Cholmáin, in 689.

He was killed, along with his son Bresal, by his kinsmen Áed mac Dlúthaig and Congalach mac Conaing Cuirre at Grellaigh Dollaith. According to the Annals of Tigernach, this occurred in battle, but the Fragmentary Annals of Ireland state that Finsnechta was murdered in a tent by Congalach. Congalach succeeded Fínsnechta as King of Brega, and Loingsech mac Óengusso, of the northern Cenél Conaill branch of the Uí Néill, was the next High King.

Fínsnechta's descendants, the Clan Fínsnechtai, played no important role after him. Fínsnechta was survived by a son named Ailill who was killed in 718.

The earliest surviving list of High Kings of Ireland, that in the Baile Chuind Chétchathaig was apparently compiled in Fínsnechta's reign.

== See also ==
- Kings of Brega
