= Áed Allán =

Irish king of Ailech

King of Ailech
- Reign: 722 – 743
- Predecessor: Fergal mac Máele Dúin
- Successor: Niall Frossach mac Fergaile
- Died: 743

Áed Allán (or Áed mac Fergaile) (died 743) was an 8th-century Irish king of Ailech and High King of Ireland. Áed Allán was the son of Fergal mac Máele Dúin and a member of the Cenél nEógain, a branch of the Northern Uí Néill.

Fergal was killed, along with many others, at the battle of Almain, in 722. This battle had been fought against Murchad mac Brain of the Uí Dúnlainge, the king of Leinster. The king of the Northern Uí Néill at this time was Flaithbertach mac Loingsig of the Cenél Conaill. Áed Allán faced Flaithbertach in battle at Mag Itha in 734, and was defeated. Nonetheless, Flaithbertach abdicated or was deposed shortly after and joined the monastery at Ard Macha (Armagh).

The chief requirement of a would-be High King was success in battle, and Áed Allán faced the Ulaid, under Áed Róin of the Dál Fiatach at Faughart. The kings of the Ulaid controlled most of eastern Ulster, while the Cenél nEógain heartland lay in County Tyrone. Áed Allán defeated the Ulaid, killing Áed Róin and the king of the Uí Echach Cobo, so gaining control of Conailli Muirthemne.

In 737, Áed Allán met with the Eóganachta king Cathal mac Finguine at Terryglass, probably neutral ground not within the control of either king. Byrne says that it is unlikely that Cathal, king of Munster, acknowledged Áed Allán's authority — the Uí Néill had little enough influence in the south — but if Cathal had expected some benefit from the meeting, where he perhaps acknowledged the ecclesiastical supremacy of Armagh, he was to be disappointed. However, the clerics of Armagh may have been well satisfied as the Annals of Ulster, in the entry following that which reports the meeting of Áed Allán and Cathal, say that the law of Patrick was in force in Ireland. This presumably means that Áed Allán and Cathal agreed to the special treatment of the church, its lands and its tenants, as prescribed by the law of Patrick.

In 738, Áed Allán fought against the armies of Leinster at the battle of Áth Senaig—the battle of groans. The Annals of Ulster and the Annals of Tigernach devote considerable space to the battle, in which Áed Allán was wounded and the Leinster king Áed mac Colggen of the Uí Cheinnselaig killed. Bran Bec of the Uí Dúnlainge, the son of that Murchad mac Brain Mut who had defeated Áed Allán's father in 722, was also killed. The Annals of Ulster say:

And men say that so many fell in this great battle that we find no comparable slaughter in a single onslaught and fierce conflict throughout all preceding ages.

This defeat seems to have crushed the Uí Chennselaig as, for almost three centuries after the battle of Áth Senaig, the Uí Dúnlainge dominated the kingship of Leinster. Áed Allán died in 743, in battle at Seredmag, defeated by Domnall Midi of Clann Cholmáin. The Annals quote a verse supposedly composed by Áed Allán on the day of battle:

If my dear God had spared me
On the shore of Loch Sailchedáin,
Were I to commit sin thereafter,
It would have been like giving valuables to a slave.

Áed Allán was succeeded as High King by Domnall Midi. According to some lists Niall Frossach followed him as King of Ailech, but others disagree. Flaithbertach's son Áed Muinderg is called rí in Tuaisceart—King of the North, a title apparently meaning that he was acknowledged as chief ruler among the northern Uí Néill and perhaps as Domnall Midi's deputy—at his death in 764. His son Máel Dúin mac Áedo Alláin (died 788) later became king of Ailech.
