= Cenn Fáelad =

7th-century Irish monarch

Cenn Fáelad mac Blathmaic (died 675) followed his father Blathmac mac Áedo Sláine (d. 665) and his brother Sechnassach (d. 671) as High King of Ireland and king of Brega. He belonged to the Síl nÁedo Sláine kindred of the southern Uí Néill which took its name from his grandfather Áed Sláine (died 604).

He was killed, probably in an ambush during a royal circuit of Ireland, near Lough Derg, by his first cousin, rival, and eventual successor, Fínsnechta Fledach (died 695).

The Fragmentary Annals of Ireland say of this:

The soldiers from the west of the land closed about Fínnachta; Cenn Fáelad's kingship was shorn from him—great its propriety.

While the Baile Chuinn Chétchathaig, compiled in the reign of Fínsnechta, does not include Cenn Fáelad among its High Kings, the Chronicle of Ireland, on which other Irish annals were founded, named him as a High King. The omission of Cenn Faelad from this king list may be deliberate as it was compiled in the reign of his killer Fínsnechta Fledach.

His descendants the Uí Chinn Fháelad sept played no major role.

== Notes ==
Preceded by Sechnassach	High King of Ireland or King of Tara; 672–679	Succeeded by Fínsnechta Fledach
