= Cináed mac Írgalaig =

Cináed mac Írgalaig (died 728) or Cináed Cáech, "the one-eyed", was an Irish King of Brega who was High King of Ireland.

== Background ==
Cináed was the son of Írgalach mac Conaing (died 702), a previous King of Brega. He belonged to the Uí Chonaing sept of Cnogba (Knowth) of the Síl nÁedo Sláine branch of the southern Uí Néill.

Tradition records that Cináed was born half-blind to his mother Muirenn (died 748), after Saint Adomnán cursed his father Írgalach's descendants for the killing of Niall mac Cernaig Sotal (died 701) of the rival Uí Chernaig sept of South Brega. Muirenn was pregnant at the time and entreated the saint to relent. The Fragmentary Annals of Ireland render the words of the saint as follows:

"The infant in your womb will be king indeed, but one of his eyes is now broken as a result of the cursing of his father."

== Career ==
Cináed ruled Brega from 724-728 and in North Brega from 718. His accession to the rule of North Brega could date from 718 when he succeeded Amalgaid mac Congalaig (died 718). However, Suibne mac Congalaig of the Uí Chonaing is listed as being slain at the Battle of Allen where the Uí Néill were crushed by the men of Leinster in 722. He won the kingship of Brega and the high kingship by defeating and slaying Fogartach mac Néill of the Uí Chernaig sept at the Battle of Cenn Deilgden (possibly Kildalkey, Meath).

The Annals of Tigernach record events of his reign where he asserted his dominance over other areas of Ireland. These are not recorded in the Annals of Ulster. In 725 is recorded his taking of Ulaid, and in 726, he defeated the Leinstermen at the Battle of Maíne and he received what he wanted from the Laigin. The remains of Saint Adomnán were brought over to Ireland and his law was promulgated anew in 727.

== Death ==
In 728, he was defeated and killed at the battle of Druim Corcainn (or Druim Ciarain—the place is unidentified) by Flaithbertach mac Loingsig of the northern Cenél Conaill, who then established himself as High King. Feradach mac Máele Dúin of the Cenél Lóegaire was also slain in this battle.

The historian T.M. Charles-Edwards links the definitive conquest of Ciannachta Breg between the Boyne and the Delvin by the Uí Chonaing and between the Delvin and the Liffey by the Uí Chernaig to his reign. With the exception of Congalach Cnogba in the 10th century, he was the last Síl nÁedo Sláine High King of Ireland. His son Domnall mac Cináeda (died 749) was slain at the Battle of Ard Ciannachta.

== See also ==
- Kings of Brega
