= Donnchad Midi =

8th-century Irish monarch

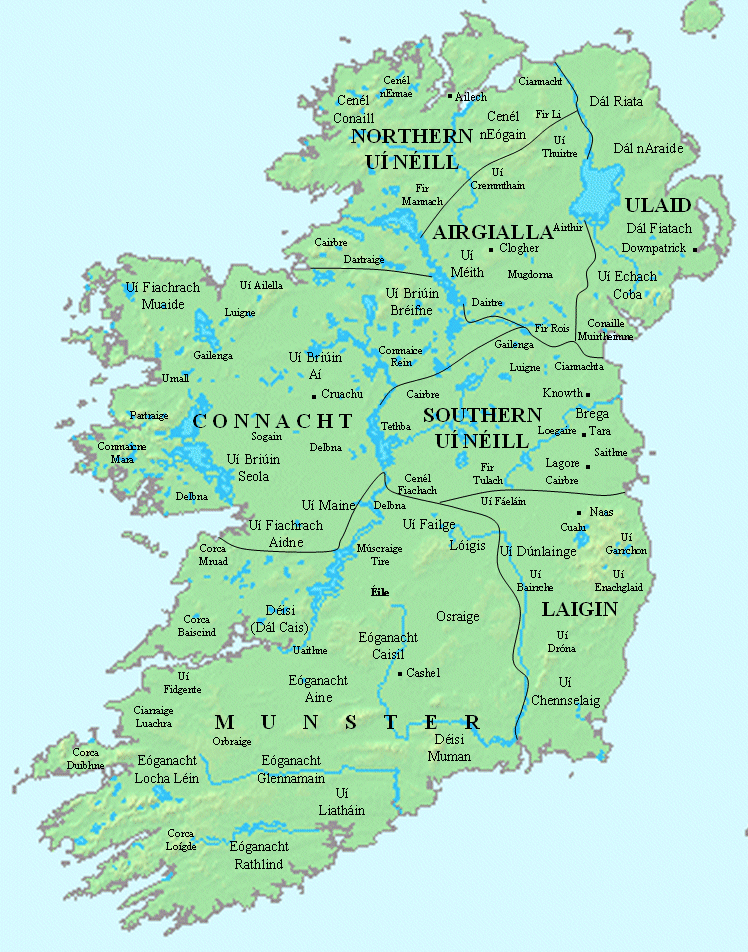
Ireland in the 8th century. The kingdoms of Uisnech and Mide are not shown; they lie underneath the words "Southern Uí Néill".

Donnchad mac Domnaill (733 – 6 February 797), called Donnchad Midi, was High King of Ireland. His father, Domnall Midi, had been the first Uí Néill High King from the south-central Clann Cholmáin based in modern County Westmeath and western County Meath, Ireland. The reigns of Domnall and his successor, Niall Frossach of the Cenél nEógain, had been relatively peaceful, but Donnchad's rule saw a return to a more expansionist policy directed against Leinster, traditional target of the Uí Néill, and also, for the first time, the great southern kingdom of Munster.

Donnchad continued his father's support for the Columban churches, led by Iona. In his many wars he used the churches, particularly the Columban monastery of Durrow, as a source of support. He also ruthlessly attacked and plundered churches that supported his rivals among the Uí Néill and also those of Leinster and Munster. Donnchad was remembered, not always fondly, as a warrior king. He firmly established Clann Cholmáin's dominance among the Uí Néill kindreds of the midlands. His descendants shared in the High Kingship until the time of Máel Sechnaill mac Domnaill, the last traditional High King of Ireland.

== Origins and background ==
Donnchad was a son of Domnall Midi and Domnall's only known wife, Ailbíne ingen Ailello of Ard Ciannacht, a minor kingdom of the coast north of the River Boyne. Domnall was reckoned High King of Ireland from 743, when he defeated and killed Áed Allán of the northern Cenél nEógain branch of the Uí Néill, until his death on 20 November 763. Domnall was eventually followed as High King by Áed Allán's younger brother Niall Frossach, who was apparently without rivals. The succession to the kingship of Clann Cholmáin, the branch of the Uí Néill to which Domnall and Donnchad belonged, was altogether less peaceable.

Donnchad's distant kinsman Fallomon mac Con Congalt of Clann Cholmáin Bicc appears to have held the title king of Mide at his death in 766, so that Donnchad can at most have been king of Uisnech, chief of Clann Cholmáin, at his father's death. The Irish annals record strife among Donnchad's kin after his death. His brother Diarmait Dub was killed in 764, leading the forces of the monastery of Durrow in battle against those of Clonmacnoise, led by Bressal mac Murchado, probably his brother's son. Bressal was himself killed later the same year. That year Donnchad defeated the Fir Tulach Midi, a minor people who lived by Lough Ennell and the following year, with the support of Fallomon mac Con Congalt, he defeated and killed his own brother Murchad at Carn Fiachach, near present-day Rathconrath, County Westmeath. Fallomon was killed in 766, after which Donnchad became King of Mide.

== King of Mide ==
In 769 Donnchad drove Coirpre mac Fogartaig, King of Lagore, into exile. Coirpre, son of former High King Fogartach mac Néill, ruled the southern part of Brega and may have been the leading representative of the rival, but internally divided, southern Uí Néill kin group of Síl nÁedo Sláine. The following year, to a background of internal conflict in Leinster, Donnchad led an army into the province. The king of Leinster, Cellach mac Dúnchada, refused to give battle and Donnchad remained camped at Dún Ailinne for a week while his army pillaged Leinster.

The late Annals of the Four Masters places Niall Frossach's abdication in the same year as Donnchad's campaign in Leinster, dated to 770 by the Annals of Ulster, and places the beginning of Donnchad's reign from 771 AD. Later sources present the succession of High Kings as regular, with one king following another immediately. This is not believed to be an accurate representation. Where Niall Frossach is concerned, some years may have elapsed between his death and Domnall Midi's inauguration. Another possible cause for, or sign of, Niall's fall from power appears in 771 and 772 when Donnchad campaigned in the lands of the northern Uí Néill.

In 775 Donnchad took control of the monastery at Clonard in the Leinster borderlands. He also campaigned in Munster. The Annals of Ulster record that Donnchad "did great devastation in the territory of the Munstermen, and many of the Munstermen fell". He repeated this in 776 with the aid of the community of Durrow.

Donnchad is recorded as twice having disturbed the óenach of Tailtiu, first in 774, when no explanation is given, and again in 777, this time the annals state that the Ciannachta, by which the Síl nÁedo Sláine—this time, the north Brega branch of the kindred are meant—were the targets. This is explicitly linked to the war between Donnchad and Congalach mac Conaing, the King of Knowth, which began earlier in 777 when Donnchad led an army from Leinster into Brega. A pitched battle somewhere in Brega in 778 ended with Congalach and many of his allies dead.

== High King of Ireland ==
The only evidence that Donnchad may have been High King before Niall Frossach's death comes in 778 when he is said to have proclaimed the "law of Columba" together with Bressal, Abbot of Iona. Niall died later that year on Iona. In 779 Donnchad campaigned against the northern Uí Néill once again and received the submission of the "king of the North", Domnall, son of Áed Muinderg.

And this is the outcome
of the meeting at Inis na Ríg:
Fiachnae cannot come to land,
Donnchad will not go to sea.

— After the Annals of Ulster, AU 784.8

A raid on Donnchad's territories by the Leinstermen in 780 was repulsed. Later in the year a meeting between the Uí Néill and the Leinstermen was held, and the King of Tara is believed to have settled whatever dispute had provoked the raid. In 784 a similar meeting appears to have been planned between Donnchad and Fiachnae mac Áedo Róin, the King of Ulster, at Inis na Ríg, one of the islands that gave modern Skerries its name. The intended conference was turned into a non-event by Donnchad's refusal to appear the lesser party by boarding Fiachnae's ship and Fiachnae's refusal to come ashore for the same reason. This was commemorated in verse in the margins of the Annals of Ulster.

In 786 the annals record that Febordaith, head of the monastery at Dulane, was killed. A later gloss adds that the killing was avenged. This appears to be related to the following entry in the Annals of Ulster, which reports that Donnchad defeated the Síl nÁedo Sláine at Lia Finn, near to modern Nobber, killing Fogartach mac Cummuscaig, the king of Lagore.

In 791 Donnchad is said to have "dishonour[ed] the staff of Jesus and relics of Patrick" during an óenach, probably the óenach of Tailtiu. The óenach Tailten may have seen further trouble in 791, for Donnchad attacked Áed Oirdnide and drove him from Tailtiu and out of the valley of the river Boyne. Cathal mac Echdach, king of the Uí Chremthainn, and other notables were killed in the rout. The last of the many records of Donnchad at war comes in 794, when he aided Leinster against Munster. Donnchad died early in 797, aged 64. He was succeeded as High King by Niall Caille's son Áed Oirdnide and by his son Domnall as head of Clann Cholmáin and King of Mide.

Donnchad's reputation was mixed. The Félire Óengusso, written at Tallaght in the borderlands of Leinster, apparently includes him among the oppressive secular rulers whom the authors dismissed as at best unimportant and at worst wicked. It does, however, confirm the apparent record of the annals, that Donnchad was a warlike ruler quite unlike his father, referring to him as "Donnchad the wrathful, ruddy, chosen". While Donnchad was a friend to the Columban churches, other religious communities, and especially those on the borders of Munster, suffered at his hands. Although earlier histories saw the arrival of the Vikings, first attested in the seas around Ireland shortly before Donnchad's death, as responsible for changes in warfare that made churches a frequent target, Donnchad and his contemporaries sacked churches with some regularity.

== Family ==
Donnchad was certainly married to Bé Fáil ingen Cathail, daughter of Cathal mac Muiredaig, eponym of the Leth Cathail in Ulster. Her death is recorded by the Annals of Ulster in 801: "Be Fáil daughter of Cathal, Donnchad's queen, died." Their children included Óengus and Máel Ruanaid. Donnchad is less certainly believed to have been married to one Fuirseach, daughter of a Dál nAraidi king named Congal, said to have borne him Conchobar. The mother of his sons Ailill, Conn, Domnall and Falloman and his daughters Gormlaith and Euginis is not recorded. Eithne, who married Bran Ardchenn, King of Leinster, is sometimes called Donnchad's daughter but was more probably his sister.

Conn had predeceased his father, killed in 795. It was Domnall who succeeded Donnchad as King of Mide on his death, but he ruled for only a short time. The Annals of Ulster report that "Domnall son of Donnchad was treacherously killed by his kinsmen" in 799.

Donnchad's son Conchobar mac Donnchada was later king of Mide and High King. Máel Ruanaid was king of Mide and father of later High King Máel Sechnaill mac Máele Ruanaid. Ailill was killed in 803 fighting against his brother Conchobar at Ruba Conaill. Óengus died in 830, and he is called "king of Telach Midi"; so too did Fallomon, killed fighting the Munstermen. It may be that Ruaidrí son of Donnchad, the secundas abbas of Clonard and tanaise of Clonmacnoise—these terms probably mean he was vice-abbot of both communities— whose death in 838 is reported by the Chronicon Scotorum, was a son of this Donnchad.

Gormflaith ingen Donncadha, who died in 861, was married to Niall Caille and Áed Findliath was their son. Eugenis, who died in 802, is called "queen of the king of Tara" by the Annals of Ulster.

== Notes ==
Donnchad Midi Clann Cholmáin
Regnal titles
Preceded by Fallomon mac Con Congalt	King of Mide; 766–797	Succeeded by Domnall mac Donnchada Midi
Preceded by Niall Frossach	High King of Ireland; 766/778 – 793/797	Succeeded by Áed Oirdnide
