= Fogartach mac Néill =

Fogartach Mac'Artain (died 724), sometimes called Fogartach ua Cernaich, was an Irish king who is reckoned a High King of Ireland. He belonged to the Uí Chernaig sept of the Síl nÁedo Sláine branch of the southern Uí Néill. He was King of Brega and was the son of Niall mac Cernaig Sotal (died 701) and great-grandson of the high king Diarmait mac Áedo Sláine (died 665).

== King of Brega ==
Fogartach may be identified with the "Focortoch" who signed as a guarantor of the Cáin Adomnáin at Birr in 697. The earliest report of him in the Irish annals is his flight from the battlefield at the Battle of Claenath (Clane, Co. Kildare) in 704 following the defeat of a number of southern Uí Néill kings by Cellach Cualann (died 715), King of Leinster.

In 714, Fogartach was deposed as king of Brega and exiled in Britain. It has been suggested that it was the High King, Fergal mac Máele Dúin (died 722), who deposed him, but it appears more likely that this was a dispute within the fractious Síl nÁedo Sláine, and that Fogartach was removed by his uncle Conall Grant (died 718), assisted by Murchad Midi (died 715) of Clann Cholmáin. Conall killed Murchad the following year and Fogartach returned in 716.

He caused some manner of disturbance in 717 at the Oenach Tailtiu—an annual Uí Néill gathering held at Teltown—where "Ruba's son and Dub Sléibe's son" were killed, but the annalistic record lacks sufficient context to explain what happened there and why. The following year Conall Grant won a battle against a coalition of southern Uí Néill kings at Kells, but was killed by Fergal mac Máele Dúin later that year.

In the early 720s, Fogartach's lands were under attack by the kings of Leinster and Cathal mac Finguine, king of Munster. Fergal mac Máele Dúin undertook campaigns against Leinster in revenge, but was killed by the Leinstermen on one of these, at the battle of Allen, on 11 December 722. His brother Áed Laigin was slain in this battle.

== High King ==
Fogartach replaced Fergal as High King, but himself fell victim to the war within the Síl nÁedo Sláine, being killed in the battle of Cenn Deilgden by his distant kinsman and successor Cináed mac Írgalaig of the Uí Chonaing sept of North Brega. This was an old feud, Cináed's father having assassinated Fogartach's father in 701. The report of his death in the Annals of Ulster does not refer to him as High King.

== Descendants ==
His sons included:

- Flann Foirbthe (died 716) who died in his father's lifetime.
  - -His son Cernach was slain at the Battle of Bolg Bóinne in 770.
- Cernach mac Fogartaig (died 738) killed by his criminal adherents.
- Fergus mac Fogartaig (died 751) called King of South Brega at his death obit.
- Finsnechta mac Fogartaig (died 761)
- Coirpre mac Fogartaig (died 771) called King of Brega in his death obit.
- Fogartach mac Cummascaig (died 786) king of South Brega
- Cummuscach mac Fogartaig (flourished 778)

His descendants representing the main line of the Uí Chernaig sept based at Lagore were in rivalry with his uncle Conall Grant's descendants, the Síl Conaill Graint based at Calatruim for the rule of southern Brega.
