= Áed Sláine =

Áed mac Diarmato (died 604), called Áed Sláine (Áed of Slane), was the son of Diarmait mac Cerbaill. Legendary stories exist of Áed's birth. Saint Columba is said to have prophesied his death. His descendants, the Síl nÁedo Sláine—the seed of Áed of Slane—were prominent in 7th and early 8th century Ireland.

== Origins ==
Áed's mother is said to have been Mugain Mór, perhaps an euhemerisation of a Munster sovereignty goddess. This Mugain is called the daughter of Conchrad mac Duach, the king of Osraige. Mugain and Diarmait's marriage is barren, and Mugain is humiliated by Diarmait's chief wife until she is given blessed holy water to drink by Saint Finnian of Moville, after which she gives birth to a lamb, then to a salmon, and finally to Áed.

The two great Southern Uí Néill dynasties of the midlands were the Síl nÁedo Sláine (the Seed of Áedo of Slane), kings of Brega in the east, and the Clann Cholmáin Máir (the Children of Colmán the Great) in Mide with their centre in the heart of modern Westmeath. The former are more prominent in the seventh century, but after the death of Cináed mac Írgalaig in 728 all the high-kings of the Southern Uí Néill come from the Clann Cholmáin except for a brief period between 944 and 956 when the king of Knowth, Congalach Cnogba, restored the high-kingship to the Brega line.

Finnian prophesied that Áed would "surpass his brethren and more kings will come from him than from the sons of others". This prophecy may date to the period before 750, when the Síl nÁedo Sláine were dominant, after which the descendants of Áed's brother Colmán Már—Clann Cholmáin—were clearly the most important group descended from Diarmait mac Cerbaill. A third brother of Áed, Colmán Bec, was also an ancestor figure, but of the less important Caílle Follamain.

== Life ==
Compared to his father and his sons, relatively little is said of Áed, either in the Irish annals or in other sources such as hagiography or heroic verse.

Adomnán recounts Columba's prophecy to Áed in his Life of St Columba. Columba told Áed that he would be as great a king as his father—Adomnán calls Diarmait king of Ireland—only if he avoided kinslaying. If he killed a kinsman he would be king only of his own people and that for only a short time.

According to some later king lists, Áed was jointly High King of Ireland with Colmán Rímid of the Cenél nEógain after the death of Áed mac Ainmuirech in 598. Áed mac Ainmuirech died in battle near Baltinglass, modern County Wicklow, fighting against Brandub mac Echach, King of Leinster.

It was to distinguish him from that Áed and from others that Áed mac Diarmato received his cognomen, "Áed of Slane", referring to the Hill of Slane, a prehistoric site near the Hill of Tara, which lay within his lands. Some sources omit Áed from the list of kings, including the earliest, that found in the Baile Chuind Chétchathaig, a work of dynastic propaganda compiled in the reign of Áed's grandson Fínsnechta Fledach. His omission from this is believed to be a transcription error, and it is very likely that he was High King.

In 600 Áed had his nephew, Suibne mac Colmáin Már, killed, "treacherously" says Adomnán. According to Marianus Scotus, Suibne, rather than Áed and Colmán Rímid, had been High King. In 604 both Áed was killed on the orders of Suibne mac Colmáin Már's son, Conall Guthbinn. Colmán was murdered by a kinsman and Suibne's son Conall Guthbinn killed Áed. This may have happened in battle and Áed may have been allied with the Uí Failgi, neighbours of Conall's. Áed and Colmán Rímid were followed as High King by Áed Uaridnach.

Áed's recorded children are at least six sons, including Diarmait and Blathmac, and a daughter named Rontud. Áed's grandchildren included Fínsnechta Fledach, Sechnassach and Cenn Fáelad. His wife's name is recorded as Eithne.
