= Kings of Brega =

Rulers of Brega, a petty kingdom north of Dublin in medieval Ireland

The Kings of Brega were rulers of Brega, a petty kingdom north of Dublin in medieval Ireland.

== Overview ==
Brega took its name from Magh Breagh (Breá), meaning "fine plain", in modern County Meath, County Louth and County Dublin, Ireland. They formed part of the Uí Néill kindred, belonging to the Síl nÁedo Sláine branch of the southern Uí Néill. The kingdom of Brega included the Hill of Tara, the site where the High King of Ireland was proclaimed. Brega was bounded on the east by the Irish Sea and on the south by the River Liffey. It extended northwards across the River Boyne to include Sliabh Breagha the line of hills in southern County Louth. The western boundary, which separated it from the Kingdom of Mide, was probably quite fluid and is not accurately known.

Brega was annexed in the 6th century by the Uí Néill. By the middle of the 8th century, the Síl nÁedo Sláine had split into two hostile branches: Southern Brega, or the Kingdom of Loch Gabhair, which was ruled by the Uí Chernaig; and Northern Brega, or the Kingdom of Cnogba/Knowth, which was ruled by the Uí Chonaing. Despite this, many kings of Brega ruled over both areas, and thus Brega as a whole, until the kingdom's extinction in the early years of the Norman invasion of Ireland. In later centuries Brega was threatened by the rise of the Viking Kingdom of Dublin and came under the suzerainty of the kings of Mide. In the divisions of that kingdom in the twelfth century parts of Brega, or East Mide, came under the control of Tigernán Ua Ruairc of Breifne and Diarmaid mac Murchadha of the Laighin. Donnchad Ua Cerbaill of Airgíalla, the half-brother of Ua Ruairc, took Árd Ciannachta and consolidated his position by donating land from it for Mellifont Abbey.

Persons in bold considered to be High Kings of Ireland.

1. **Áed Sláine** (died 604) son of Diarmait mac Cerbaill
2. Conall Laeg Breg mac Áedo Sláine (died 612)
3. Congal mac Áedo Sláine (died 634)
4. Ailill Cruitire mac Áedo Sláine (died 634)
5. **Blathmac** (died 665) and **Diarmait** (died 665), sons of Áed Sláine
6. Conaing Cuirre mac Congaile (died 662)
7. **Sechnassach** (died 671) son of Blathmac
8. **Cenn Fáelad** (died 675) son of Blathmac
9. **Finsnechta Fledach** (died 695) son of Dúnchad son of Áed Sláine
10. Congalach mac Conaing Cuirre (died 696)
11. Irgalach mac Conaing Cuirre (died 702)
12. Amalgaid mac Congalaig (died 718)
13. Conall Grant mac Cernaig (died 718)
14. **Fogartach** (died 724) son of Niall son of Cernach Sotal son of Diarmait
15. **Cináed** (died 728) son of Irgalach
16. Conaing mac Amalgado (died 742)
17. Indrechtach mac Dungalaig (died 748)
18. Dúngal mac Amalgado (died 759)
  1. -Coirpre mac Fogartaig (died 771)
19. Congalach mac Conaing (died 778)
20. Diarmait mac Conaing (died 786)
21. Flann mac Congalaig (died 812)
22. Cernach mac Congalaig (died 818)
23. Cummascach mac Congalaig (died 839)
24. Conaing mac Flainn (died 849)
25. Cináed mac Conaing (died 851)
26. Flann mac Conaing (died 868)
27. Flannacán mac Cellaig (died 896)
28. Máel Finnia mac Flannacain (died 903)
29. Máel Mithig mac Flannacain (died 919)

== Kings of Cnogba/Knowth ==
List incomplete: see Mac Shamhráin, 2004. The Uí Chonaing had earlier been settled around Tailtiu and Ráith Airthir in the valley of the Blackwater; that district was left to another branch of Síl nÁeda Sláne, Síl nDlúthaig upon the conquest of the Ciannachta Breg during the reign of Cináed mac Írgalaig. The title King of Ciannachta is first used by this dynasty in the Annals of Ulster in the year 742 and the use of the title King of Cnogba in 818; prior to this, it was a title used by the Ciannachta themselves. Earlier kings can be considered chiefs of the Uí Chonaing.

- Congal mac Áedo Sláine, (died 634)
- Conaing Cuirre mac Congaile (a quo Uí Chonaing), (died 662)
- Congalach mac Conaing Cuirre, (died 696)
- Irgalach mac Conaing Cuirre (died 702)
- Amalgaid mac Congalaig (died 718)
- Cináed (died 728) son of Irgalach
- Conaing mac Amalgado, (died 742) (rí Ciannachta)
- Indrechtach mac Dungalaig, (died 748) (rí Ciannachta)
- Dúngal mac Amalgado (died 759)
- Congalach mac Conaing, died 778 (rí Ciannachta)
- Diarmait mac Conaing (died 786)
- Flann mac Congalaig (died 812) (rí Ciannachta)
- Cernach mac Congalaig (died 818) (rí Cnodba)
- Cummascach mac Congalaig (died 839) (rí Ciannachta)
- Conaing mac Flainn (died 849) (rí Brega)
- Cináed mac Conaing, died 851 (rí Ciannachta)
- Flann mac Conaing (died 868) (rí Brega)
- Flannacan mac Cellach (descendant of Congalach), died 896 (rí Brega)
- Máel Finnia mac Flannacán, died 903 (rí Brega)
- Máel Mithig mac Flannacán, died 919 (rí Cnogba)
- Congalach mac Mael Mithig (rí Cnogba), died 956

== Kings of Lagore/Deiscert Breg (South Brega) ==
List incomplete: see Mac Shamhráin, 2004. The title King of Southern Brega does not appear in the Annals of Tigernach until 729 and in the Annals of Ulster until 751. Earlier rulers can be considered rulers of the Uí Chernaig sept of Síl nÁedo Sláine.

- Niall mac Cernaig Sotal, (died 701)
- Maine mac Néill, (died 712)
- Conall Grant mac Cernaig, (died 718)
- Fogartach mac Néill, (died 724)
- Cathal mac Néill, (died 729)
- Cathal mac Áeda, (died 737) (rí Desceirt Breagh)
- Cernach mac Fogartaig, (died 738)
- Fergus mac Fogartaig, (died 751) (rí Desceirt Breagh)
- Coirpre mac Fogartaig, (died 771) (rí Brega)
- Niall mac Conaill, (died 778) (rí Desceirt Breagh)
- Máel Dúin mac Fergusa, (died 785) (rí Locha Gabor)
- Fogartach mac Cummascaig (died 786) (rí Locha Gabor)
- Cummascach mac Fogartaig (died 797) (rí Deiscert Breg)
- Ailill mac Fergusa, (died 800) (rí Deiscert Breg)
- Cernach mac Fergusa (died 805) (rí Locha Gabor)
- Conall mac Néill (died 815) (rí Desceirt Breagh)
- Fogartach mac Cernaig (died 815) (leth-rí Desceirt Breagh)
- Óengus mac Máele Dúin (died 825) (rí Locha Gabor)
- Diarmait mac Néill (died 826) (rí Desceirt Breagh)
- Cairpre mac Máele Dúin (died 836) (rí Locha Gabor)
- Tigernach mac Fócartai, (died 865) (rí Locha Gabor, lethrí Breg)
- Diarmait mac Etersceili (died 868) (rí Locha Gabor)
- Máel Sechnaill mac Néill (died 870) (leth-rí Desceirt Breagh)
- Tolarg mac Cellaig (died 888) (leth-rí Desceirt Breagh)
- Máel Ograi mac Congalaig (died 908) (rí Locha Gabor)
- Fogartach mac Tolairg (died 916) (rí Desceirt Breagh)
- Beollán mac Ciarmaic (died 969) (rí Locha Gabor)
- Gilla Mo Chonna mac Fogartach mac Ciarmac (rí Deiscert Breg), died 1013
