= Branches of the Cenél Conaill =

Branch of the Northern Uí Néill

The Cenél Conaill, or "kindred of Conall", are a branch of the Northern Uí Néill, who claim descent from Conall Gulban, son of Niall of the Nine Hostages, and allegedly the first Irish nobleman to convert to Christianity. Their kingdom was known as Tír Conaill, with their powerbase at Mag Ithe in the Finn valley, however they gradually expanded to cover what is now counties Donegal and Fermanagh. The Cenél Conaill clashed regularly with their kin the Cenél nEogain, eventually capturing the latter's original power-base of Ailech in the Inishowen peninsula—in modern-day County Donegal—by the 12th century.

Below is a list of their principle clans and septs.

Sept of Irish origin
Sept of Scottish origin

== Cenél Luighdech ==
The Cenél Luighdech (more commonly known as Sil Lugdach) descend from Lugaid mac Sétnai, the great-grandson of Conall Gulban. Their tribal territory extended from Dobhar (Gweedore) to the river Suilidhe (Swilly) in County Donegal. The O'Donnells and O'Dohertys who descend from this branch, were the two principal and most powerful septs of the Cenél Conaill. The most famous descendant of the Cenél Conaill is Saint Columba, who founded the monastery at Derry, and is claimed as being the grandson of Conall Gulban.

Sept (Common Forms)		
Ó Domhnaill (O'Donnell, Donnell)	Meaning: World ruler Progenitor: Domhnall	Territory: Kilmacrenan, Donegal; Extra: In the 13th century they rose to power as kings of Cenél Conaill.
Ó Dochartaigh (O'Doherty, Doherty, Dougherty, Dockery)	Meaning: Hurtful; Progenitor: Dochartach	Territory: Raphoe, Donegal; Extra: Dochartach was 12th in lineal descent from Conall Gulben. The Ó Dochartaigh would rule Inishowen from the 13th to 17th centuries.
Mac Meanman (MacMenamin, McManaman)	Meaning: Courage, spirit Progenitor: Meanma	Territory: Donegal; Extra:
Mac Daibhéid (MacDevitt, MacDavitt, Devitt, Davitt)	Meaning: Descendants of David O'Doherty; Progenitor: David	Territory: Glenfinn, Co. Donegal; by the 15th c., also Inishowen; Extra: The McDevitt leaders served as counselors and emissaries for the O'Doherty leadership based at Elagh Castle, Elagh More Townland, County Londonderry
Mac Giolla Bhríghde (MacBride, MacGilbride)	Meaning: Devotee of (St) Brigid; Progenitor: Giolla Bríde Ó Dochartaigh	Territory: Parish of Raymunterdoney; Extra:
Mac Eachmharcaigh (MacCafferty, MacCaffrey)	Meaning: Horse-rider; Progenitor:	Territory: Donegal; Extra: Eachmarach was a popular personal name amongst the O'Donnells
Ó Baoighill (O'Boyle, Boyle, Boal, Bohill)	Meaning: Pledge; Progenitor: Baighill mac Bradagain	Territory: Ballyweel (town of the O'Boyles), Tír mBoghuine and Tír Ainmireach Extra:

== Cenél Aedha ==
The Cenél Aedha ("kindred of Aed") are descended from Aedha mac Ainmirech, great-great grandson of Conall Gulban, son of Niall of the Nine Hostages. His father, Ainmirech mac Sétnai was the brother of Lugaid mac Sétnai, founder of the Cenél Luighdech. The Cenél Aedha are said to have given their name to the barony of Tirhugh (Tír Aedha). Gallchobar was the principal descendant of Conall Gulban, allowing the Gallaghers to claim to be the most senior and prestigious branch of the entire Cenél Conaill.

Sept (Common Forms)		
Ó Gallchobhair (O'Gallagher, Gallagher)	Meaning: Foreign help Progenitor: Gallchobar	Territory: Ballybeit and Ballyneglack, Tír Aedha (Tirhugh), Donegal; Extra: Hereditary chief was marshal of the O'Donnell's forces, chief of Cenél Aedha.
Ó Canannain (Cannon, Canning)	Meaning: Progenitor: Canann	Territory: Letterkenny; Extra: Letterkenny derives its names from the Ó Canannain sept
Ó Connalláin (O'Conlon, Conlon, Conlan)	Meaning: Progenitor: Connall	Territory: Crioch Tullach; Extra:
Ó Maeldoraidh (O'Muldorey)	Meaning: Progenitor:	Territory: Extra:

== Cenél Eanna ==
The Cenél Eanna or Enda, or "kindred of Enda", descend from Eanna, the sixth son of Conall Gulban. They are listed as kings of Magh Ith, Tír Eanna, and Fanad in present-day County Donegal, a territory around the southern tip of Inishowen.

Sept (Common Forms)		
Ó Lapáin (O'Lappin, Lappin, Delap)	Meaning: Progenitor:	Territory: Tirconnell, Donegal and then later Co. Armagh; Extra:
Ó hEicnechan	Meaning: Roughly O'Heneghan; Progenitor:	Territory: Tirconnell; Extra: Cited in the annals as chief of Cenél nEnda
Ó Breasláin (O'Breslin, Breslin, Breslane)	Meaning: Descendant of Breaslán; Progenitor:	Territory: Inniskeel, Fanad peninsula, later Derryvullan, Fermanagh; Extra: Forced out of Fanad by the MacSweeneys in 1261 and migrated to Fermanagh where they became brehons to the Maguires.

== Other Septs ==
Sept (Common Forms)		
Mac Ailín (MacAllan, MacAlan, McCallion)	Meaning: Son of Ailín; Progenitor: Ailín	Territory: Extra: Clan Campbell Mac Ailíns were brought as gallowglasses to Tirconnell by the O'Donnells in the 15th century. In the early 1600s, the McCallions served the O'Dohertys and their leadership was based in Gleneely, Inishowen.
Poole (Ó Pollach) Cenél Conaill	Meaning: Descendant of Poole YDNA RBY21233 - (RDF104 - RDF105)	Territory: Extra: Clan Poole's tested YDNA shows that the paternal bloodline comes from the Cenél Conaill of Tír Conaill. The bloodline of this sept goes beyond its modern surname.

=== Cenél mBógaine ===
The Cenél mBógaine, or "kindred of Binny", descend from Énna Bóguine, son of Conall Gulban. The territory of the Cenél mBógaine is stated as Tír Boghaine, which O'Donovan equates to being the barony of Banagh, and part of the barony of Boylagh in County Donegal. The Laud 610 Genealogies, compiled c.1000 AD, give seven sons for Énna Bóguine- Secht maic Bógaine .i. Áedh Cesdubh, Feidilmid, Brandubh Caech Cluassach, Anmere, Crimthan Lethan, Fergus, Eichín & Melge. However O'Clery's Book of Genealogies give a different listing- Ui. mic Enda bogaine mic Conaill gulban .i. Melge, Lugaid, Criomhthann, Anguine, Niall, Cathair. Mac don Chathair sin Caelmhaine diaruo mac an Conall errderc.

Saint Crona (Croine Bheag) is descended from the Cenél mBógaine, being 5th in lineal descent from Énna Bóguine.

=== Cenél Duach ===
The Cenél Duach, or "kindred of Duach", are named after Tigernach Duí (Duach), son of Conall Gulban. Tigernach's son Nainnid is mentioned as being at the battle of Móin Daire Lothair (modern-day Moneymore, County Londonderry) where the Northern Uí Néill defeated the Cruithin. Baedan, grandson of Tigernach through Nainnid would rule as king of Tara for one year in AD 568.

== See also ==
- Northern Uí Néill
- Branches of the Cenél nEógain
- Tyrconnell

== Bibliography ==
- Robert Bell (1988). "The Book of Ulster Surnames", The Black Staff Press
