= Loch Gabhar =

Coordinates: 53.508063°N 6.506375°W

Loch Gabhar (Lagore) is an area in the barony of Ratoath, County Meath, Ireland. It is located between the villages of Ratoath and Dunshaughlin and is the origin of the names of the townlands of Lagore Big (Loch Gabhar Mór) and Lagore Little (Loch Gabhar Beag).

The name has two interpretations. One is "Lake of (the) Goats" and the other is Loch dá Gabhar as "Lake of (the) Two Horses", explained in the eleventh-century Dindsenchas as the place where Gáeth ("Wind") and Grían ("Sun"), the horses of Eochu, king of Munster were drowned, using a literary homonym gabhar meaning "horse" rather than "goat".

Lagore is also home to the Lagore crannóg, the Irish royal residence of the 7th to 10th centuries.

During excavations of the site a number of bronze items were found, including weapons and brooches. These finds included the Lagore Brooch, which can now be found at the National Museum of Ireland on Kildare Street in Dublin.

== Kings of Lagore/Deiscert Breg (south Brega) ==
List incomplete: see Mac Shamhráin, 2004.

1. Fergus mac Fogartach mac Niall mac Cernach Sotal (a quo Clan Chernach Sotal) mac Diarmait mac Áed Sláine, died 751
2. Máel Dáin mac Fergus, died 785
3. Ailill mac Fergus, (rí Deiscert Breg), died 800
4. Beollan mac Ciarmac (descendant of Máel Dáin ?), died 979
5. Gilla Mo Chonna mac Fogartach mac Ciarmac (rí Deiscert Breg), died 1013
