= Clann Cholmáin =

Irish clan

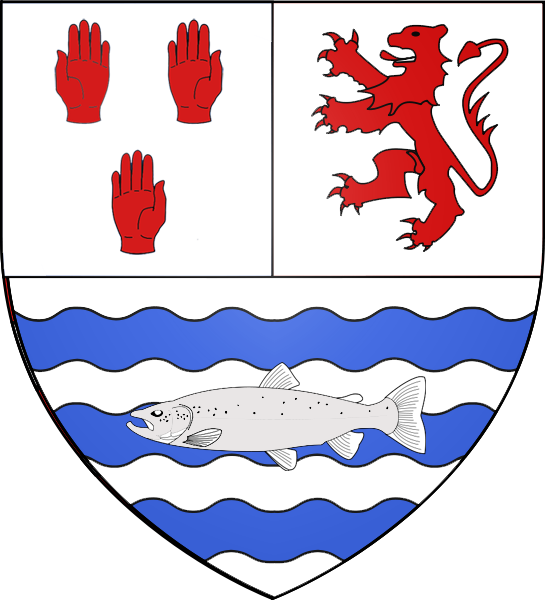
- Parent house: Uí Néill
- Country: Ireland
- Founded: 6th (5th) century
- Founder: Colmán Már
- Titles: High Kings of Ireland; Kings of Tara; Kings of Mide; Kings of Uisnech

Clann Cholmáin is the dynasty descended from Colmán Már mac Diarmato, son of Diarmait mac Cerbaill. Part of the Southern Uí Néill — they were the kings of Mide (Meath) — they traced their descent to Niall Noígiallach and his son Conall Cremthainne.

Related dynasties descended through Conall Cremthainne and Diarmait mac Cerbaill included the Síl nÁedo Sláine, the kings of Brega, descended from Colmán Már's youngest brother Áed Sláine, and the less important Clann Cholmáin Bicc (or the Caílle Follamain), descendants of the middle brother, Colmán Bec. The Kings of Uisnech, among others, belonged to Clann Cholmáin.

Important kings of Clann Cholmáin include:

- Domnall Midi (died 763),
- Donnchad Midi mac Domnaill (died 797),
- Máel Sechnaill mac Maíl Ruanaid (died 862),
- Flann Sinna (died 916),
- Máel Sechnaill mac Domnaill (died 1022).

== Bibliography ==
- Byrne, Francis John, Irish Kings and High-Kings. Batsford, London, 1973. ISBN 0-7134-5882-8
- Nebulae discutiuntur? The emergencer of Clann Cholmain, sixth-eighth centuries, Ailbhe Mac Shamhrain, in Seanchas: Studies in Early and Medieval Irish Archaeology, History and Literature in Honour of Francis John Byrne, ed. Alfred P. Smyth, pp. 83–97, Four Courts Press, Dublin, 2000.
