= Síl nÁedo Sláine =

Royal house in medieval Ireland

- Parent house: Uí Néill
- Country: Ireland
- Founded: 6th (5th) century
- Founder: Áed Sláine
- Titles: High Kings of Ireland; Kings of Tara; Kings of Brega

Síl nÁedo Sláine (Old Irish: [sʲiːlʲ ˈn̪aːi̯ðo ˈsl̪aːnʲe]) are the descendants of Áed Sláine (Áed mac Diarmato), son of Diarmait mac Cerbaill. Part of the Southern Uí Néill—they were the kings of Brega—they claimed descent from Niall Noígiallach and his son Conall Cremthainne.

With the possible exception of Óengus mac Colmáin, all Uí Néill kings descended from Diarmait mac Cerbaill belonged to the Síl nÁedo Sláine until the death of Cináed mac Írgalaig in 728. Thereafter the southern Uí Néill were dominated by Clann Cholmáin, or more precisely Clann Cholmáin Már, descended from Colmán Már. Only one member of the Síl nÁedo Sláine was High King of Ireland after 728, Congalach Cnogba, and he was the grandson and nephew of Clann Cholmáin kings.

Áed Sláine left five sons, and from each of these was descended one or more branches of the kindred.

The descendants of Congal mac Áedo Sláine were the Uí Chonaing, named for Congal's son Conaing Cuirre. This branch ruled Knowth, the northern part of Brega. Its notable members included Cináed mac Írgalaig (High King; died 728), Cináed mac Conaing (died 851) and Congalach Cnogba (High King; died 956).

The other main branch was that of Áed's son Diarmait, which ruled southern Brega from its seat at Loch Gabhair. This took the name Uí Chernaig from Diarmait's son Cernach. Its prominent members included Fogartach mac Néill (High King; died 724) and Conall mac Cernaig (Conall Grant; died 718).

From Blathmac, whose sons Sechnassach and Cenn Fáelad were both High Kings, descended the Uí Chinn Fháelad. Of Dúnchad's descendants only his son Fínsnechta Fledach was a significant figure. The Síl nDlúthaig took its name from a son of Ailill Cruitire, Dlúthach, but this was another minor group.

== See also ==
- Slane, a town near to Knowth, County Meath.
