= Uí Néill =

Gaelic dynasty

- Parent house: Connachta (Dál Cuinn)
- Country: Ireland
- Founded: 5th century AD
- Founder: Niall Noígíallach
- Current head: by sept dynast
- Titles: Kings of Tara; High Kings of Ireland; Kings of Mide; Kings of Uisnech; Kings of Ailech; Kings of Tyrone; Kings of Tyrconnell; Kings of Brega; Kings of Scotland; numerous peerages

The Uí Néill (pronounced [iː ˈnʲeːl̠ʲ]; meaning "descendants of Niall") are Irish dynasties that claim descent from Niall Noígíallach (Niall of the Nine Hostages), a historical King of Tara who is believed to have died around c. 405. They are generally divided into the Northern and Southern Uí Néill.

== Branches ==
The founders of the Uí Néill branches are the alleged sons of Niall Noigiallach, seven in all:

The Northern Uí Néill branch:

- Conall Gulban, ancestor of the Cenél Conaill dynasty,
- Eógan, ancestor of the Cenél nEógain dynasty.

The Southern Uí Néill branch:

- Éndae, ancestor of the Cenél nÉndai,
- Coirpre, ancestor of the Cenél Coirpri dynasty,
- Lóegaire, ancestor of the Cenél Lóegaire dynasty,
- Conall Cremthainne, ancestor of the Clann Cholmáin and Síl nÁedo Sláine,
- Fiachu, ancestor of the Cenél Fiachach.

All these men were in their lifetime known as members of Connachta dynasty, or as "the sons of Niall." The term Uí Néill did not, by its very nature, come into use until the time of Niall's grandsons and great-grandsons.

Dynasties descended from the Uí Néill, such as the Cenél Conaill and Cenél nEógain, held power in Ulster until their defeat in the Nine Years War in 1603. Many of the heads of the families left for Catholic Europe in 1607, an event known as the Flight of the Earls.

== Uí Néill family tree ==
Bold indicates a supposed High King of Ireland.

Genealogy of the Uí Néill

**Conn Cétchathach**
**Art mac Cuinn**	Son	Son	Son	Son
**Cormac mac Airt**
**Cairbre Lifechair**
**Fiacha Sraibhtine**
**Muiredach Tirech**
**Eochaid Mugmedon**
Brion	Fiachrae	Ailill	**Niall Noigíallach**	Fergus
Móranchél	Endae	Eógan	Coirpre	**Lóegaire**	Maine	Conall Cremthainne	Fiachu

== See also ==
- Gaelic nobility of Ireland
- Irish royal families

== Bibliography ==
- Downham, Clare (2018), Medieval Ireland, Cambridge.
- O'Brien, Michael A., ed. (1962). Corpus Genealogiarum Hiberniae. Vol. 1. Kelleher, John V. (intro. in the reprints of 1976 and 2005). Dublin: DIAS. pp. 133–4, 178–80. ISBN 0901282316. OCLC 56540733. Genealogical tables for the Uí Néill
- Byrne, Francis John (1973), Irish Kings and High Kings, Dublin.
- Ó Muraíle, Nollaig (2005), "Dubhaltach Mac Fhirbhisigh", The Great Book of Irish Genealogies, Dublin.
- Smyth, Alfred P (1974), "The Hui Neill and the Leinstermen in the Annals of Ulster, 431–516 A.D", Études Celtiques, 14: 121–43, doi:10.3406/ecelt.1974.1522.
