= 7th century in Ireland =

Events from the 7th century in Ireland.

== 600s ==
601

- Probable year in which Colmán mac Cobthaig, Uí Fiachrach becomes king of Connacht.

602 or 604

- Death of Áed mac Diarmato or Áed Sláine (Áed of Slane), the son of Diarmait mac Cerbaill. Legendary stories exist of Áed's birth. Killed his nephew and was in turn slain by his grandnephew.

603

- Death of Brandub mac Echach an Irish king of the Uí Cheinnselaig of Leinster. His father, Echu mac Muiredaig had been a king of the Ui Cheinnselaig. They belonged to a branch known as the Uí Felmeda.

605

- Birth of Colmán of Lindisfarne (died February 18, 675) also known as Saint Colmán, Bishop of Lindisfarne from 661 until 664. Colman resigned the Bishopric of Lindisfarne after the Synod of Whitby called by King Oswiu of Northumbria decided to calculate Easter using the method of the First Ecumenical Council instead of his preferred Celtic method. After his resignation he retired to live on the island of Inishbofin in Galway where he founded a monastery.

607

- Áed Uaridnach or Áed mac Domnail' (died 612), ended his reign as High King of Ireland. He is sometimes also known as Áed Allán, a name usually reserved for the 8th-century king of the same name, this Áed's great-great-grandson.

608

- Death of Fiachra Cáech, brother of Fiachnae mac Báetáin king of the Dál nAraidi and high-king of the Ulaid in the early 7th century.

609

- Death of Saint Molua (also known as Lua, Da Lua), was an Irish saint, and a Christian abbot. He was the founder of Killaloe (Irish: Cill-da-Lua), which bears his name Lua.

== 610s ==
610

- Death of Conall Laeg Breg mac Áedo Sláine, a King of Brega from the Síl nÁedo Sláine branch of the southern Uí Néill. He was the son of the high king Áed Sláine mac Diarmato (died 602). He ruled from 602-610. He is not called King of Brega in the annals but is second in a poem on the rulers of Síl nÁedo Sláine in the Book of Leinster.

611

- Suibne Menn or Suibne mac Fiachnai (died 628) was an Irish king who is counted as a High King of Ireland and started his reign in 611.

612

- Death of Áed Uaridnach, High King of Ireland until 607.

613

- Death of Rónán mac Colmáin of the Uí Dúnlainge, son of Colmán Már mac Coirpri. The Annals of Tigernach includes his death obit with the title King of Laigin, that is King of Leinster These annals interpolated dates for some Leinster kings in this period from the king lists.

615

- Death of Saint Columbanus at Bobbio (now in northern Italy)

616

- Death of Áedán mac Mongain, of the Ui Echach Coba branch of the Dal nAraide and father of Fergus mac Áedáin, a king of Ulaid from 674-692.

618

- Death of Saint Kevin of Glendalough.
- Death of Fíngen mac Áedo Duib, also known as Fingen Flann, a King of Munster. His sobriquet Flann meant "blood-red".
- Death of Áed Bennán mac Crimthainn was a possible King of Munster from the Eóganacht Locha Léin branch of the Eoganachta. He was definitely king of West Munster or Iarmuman. He was the great grandson of Dauí Iarlaithe mac Maithni also a possible king of Munster from this branch.

619

- Construction begins on the earliest known tide mill, Nendrum Monastery mill on Strangford Lough.

== 620s ==
620

- Death of Saint Finbarr (born c. 550), Bishop of Cork and patron saint for the city and diocese of Cork.

621

- The murder of the relatives of Baetan at Magh Slécht

622

- Battle of Cennbag (at Cambo, modern County Roscommon): death of Colmán mac Cobthaig, Uí Fiachrach king of Connacht, succeeded by his son Guaire Aidne mac Colmáin

623

- Suibne Menn or Suibne mac Fiachnai (died 628) was an Irish king who is counted as a High King of Ireland and ended his reign in 623.

624

- Domnall mac Áedo (died 642) was a son of Áed mac Ainmuirech; he was High King of Ireland from 624 until his death. He belonged to the Cenél Conaill kindred of the northern Uí Néill.

625

- Death of Rónán mac Colmáin was a King of Leinster following Brandub mac Echach (died 603). He belonged to the Uí Cheinnselaig and was the son of Colmán mac Cormaicc. The later Leinster king Crundmáel Erbuilc mac Rónáin (died 655) was his son.

626

- Fiachnae mac Báetáin was killed at the Battle of Leithet Midind, defeated by Fiachnae mac Demmáin of the Dál Fiatach.

627

- Death of Cathal mac Áedo Flaind Chathrach, king of Munster.

627 or 628

- Possible year of birth of Saint Adomnán of Iona

629

- The Battle of Carn Feradaig (Carhernarry, County Limerick); Guaire Aidne mac Colmáin, king of Connacht suffered a defeat at the hands of the Munster king Faílbe Flann mac Áedo Duib.

== 630s ==
630

- Approximate date of the foundation of Fore Abbey at the modern village of Fore, County Westmeath

632

- 31 January: death of St. Aedan of Ferns (born 550), an early bishop of Ferns.
- Death of Colman MacDuagh co-founder the Kilmacduagh monastery

632 or 633

- Death of the legendary Mór Muman (632 according to the Annals of Ulster, 633 according to the Annals of Tigernach)

633

- Possible beginning of the reign of Máel Dúin mac Áedo Bennán, a King of Iarmuman (west Munster)

634

- Death of Áed Dammán, called a King of Iarmumu in his obituary. He was an uncle of Máel Dúin mac Áedo Bennán.

635

- Mochuda (St. Carthage) and eight hundred of his community were expelled from Rahan near modern Tullamore, County Offaly by Blathmaic, a Meathian prince.

636

- Battle of Maigh Rath (Moira, County Down).
- Battle of Áth Goan in the western Liffey plain for the kingship of Leinster involved Faílbe Flann mac Áedo Duib.

637

- 14 May: Death of Abbot Mo Chutu of Lismore.
- Death of Conall mac Suibni, called Conall Guthbinn, a King of Uisnech in Mide of the Clann Cholmáin since 621.

639

- 14 May: Death of St. Mo Chutu of Lismore, Abbot.
- Death of Faílbe Flann mac Áedo Duib, king of Munster.
- Death of St. Molaise of Leighlin (also known as Laisrén and Laserian), a missionary who worked in both Ireland and Scotland.
- Death of St. Gobhan, Abbot, founder of St Laserian's Cathedral, Old Leighlin and founder of Killamery monastery.

== 640s ==
640

- Likely date of Adamnán joining the Columban familia (i.e. the federation of monasteries under the leadership of Iona Abbey). He is to become the eighth Abbot of Iona.
- Birth of Saint Kilian, an Irish missionary bishop and the apostle of Franconia (modern-day northern Bavaria), at Mullagh (in modern-day County Cavan).

641

- Death of Cúán mac Amalgado, a King of Munster from the Áine branch of the Eóganachta and son of a previous king, Amalgaid mac Éndai (died 601). He succeeded Faílbe Flann mac Áedo Duib in 639.

642

- Birth of Máel Ruba (Old Irish spelling), or Malruibhe (died 722), sometimes Latinised as Rufus, a monk, originally from Bangor, County Down, and founder of the monastic community of Applecross in Ross, one of the best attested early Christian monasteries in modern-day Scotland.
- Death of Domnall mac Áedo, a High King of Ireland since 624 or 628.

643

- Death of Dúnchad mac Fiachnai, who is mentioned as king of Ulaid at the time of his death.

644

- Battle of Cenn Con in Munster between Máel Dúin, son of Áed Bennán, and Aengus Liath of Glendamnach.
- Death of Aengus Liath.

646

- Death of Lochéne mac Finguine, a king of the Dal nAraide.

647

- Death of Scandal mac Bécce, a king of the Dal nAraide.

648

- Death of Máel Cobo mac Fiachnai, a Dal Fiatach king of Ulaid. He was the son of Fiachnae mac Demmáin (died 629).

649

- Death of Rogallach mac Uatach, a king of Connacht from the Uí Briúin branch of the Connachta.

== 650s ==
650

- The Book of Durrow is begun.

652

- August 12: death of Ségéne mac Fiachnaí, or Ségéne of Iona, the fifth abbot of Iona. Suibne moccu Fir Thrí becomes the sixth Abbot of Iona.

653

- Death of Máel Dóid mac Suibni, a king of Uisnech in Mide of the Clann Cholmáin. He was a son of Suibne mac Colmáin (died 598) and brother of Conall Guthbinn mac Suibni (died 637), previous kings. He ruled from 637 to 653.
- Marcán mac Tommáin, 15th King of the Uí Maine.

654

- Death of Flannesda, a son of Domnall mac Áedo (died 642), High King of Ireland.

655

- Death of Laidgnen/Loingsech mac Colmáin, son of Colmán mac Cobthaig, king of Connacht from the Ui Fiachrach branch of the Connachta.

656

- Death of Crunnmael mac Suibni Menn, a King of Ailech

657

- Death of St. Ultan of Ardbraccan, an Irish saint and Abbot-Bishop of Ardbraccan

658

- Death of Blathmac, son of the first Uí Cheinnselaig king, Rónán mac Colmáin (died 625)

659

- Death of Ailill, brother of Fínsnechta Fledach mac Dúnchada who was High King of Ireland.

== 660s ==
660

- Death of Conall Crandomna, king of Dál Riata. He is succeeded by Domangart mac Domnaill.

661

- Death of Laidcenn mac Buith Bannaig, poet.
- Death of Máenach mac Fíngin, a King of Munster from the Cashail branch of the Eoganachta.

662

- Conall and Colgu, two sons of Domhnall, son of Aedh, son of Ainmire, were slain by Ceirrceann.

662 or 663

- Death of Guaire Aidne mac Colmáin, son of Colmán mac Cobthaig, King of Connacht: he is succeeded by Muirchertach Nar mac Guaire Aidne

664-666

- A major yellow plague hits much of the island

664

- May 3: an eclipse of the sun was visible from Ireland.
- The Annals of the Four Masters records the following deaths:

A great mortality prevailed in Ireland this year, which was called the Buidhe Connail, and the following number of the saints of Ireland died of it: St. Feichin, Abbot of Fobhar, on 14 February; St. Ronan, son of Bearach; St. Aileran the Wise; St. Cronan, son of Silne; St. Manchan, of Liath; St. Ultan Mac hUi Cunga, Abbot of Cluain Iraird Clonard; Colman Cas, Abbot of Cluain Mic Nois; and Cummine, Abbot of Cluain Mic Nois. After Diarmaid (Diarmait mac Áedo Sláine) and Blathmac (Blathmac mac Áedo Sláine), the two sons of Aedh Slaine, had been eight years in the sovereignty of Ireland, they died of the same plague. There died also Maelbreasail, son of Maelduin, and Cu Gan Mathair (Cathal Cú-cen-máthair), King of Munster; Aenghus Uladh. There died very many ecclesiastics and laics in Ireland of this mortality besides these.

665

- Yellow plague outbreak at Fore Abbey
- Cathal Cú-cen-máthair, King of Munster, dies in the plague

666

- The Battle of Aine, between the Aradha and Ui Fidhgeinte, where Eoghan, son of Crunnmael, was slain.
- The Battle of Fertas (Belfast) was fought between the Ulaid and the Cruithne and Cathussach mac Luirgéne, their king, was defeated and slain.
- The Annals of the Four Masters records the following deaths:

A great plague raged in this year, of which died four abbots at Beannchair Uladh Bangor, namely, Bearach, Cummine, Colum, and Aedhan, their names. Blathmac, son of Maelcobha, King of Ulidia, died.

- Death of Cellach mac Guairi, a son of Guaire Aidne mac Colmáin, a king of Connacht
- Death of Fáelán mac Colmáin, a king of Leinster from the Uí Dúnlainge branch of the Laigin. He was the son of Colmán Már mac Coirpri, a previous king.
- Probable date of the death of Eochaid Iarlaithe, a son of Fiachnae mac Báetáin.

667

- Mayo Abbey, founded by St Colman for Saxon monks who had followed him from Lindisfarne following a Church row about how to calculate when Easter falls.

668

- Deaths of two of the three known sons of Guaire Aidne mac Colmáin; Artgal mac Guairi and Muirchertach Nár mac Guairi, a king of Connacht.

669

- February 24: death of Cumméne Find, seventh abbot of Iona. Fáilbe mac Pípáin becomes the eight abbot of Iona

== 670s ==
670

- Death of Blathmac mac Máele Cobo, was a Dal Fiatach king of Ulaid. He was the son of Máel Cobo mac Fiachnai (died 648).

671

- Death of Sechnassach mac Blathmaic who had followed his father Blathmac mac Áedo Sláine (died 665) and his uncle Diarmait mac Áedo Sláine (died 665) as High King of Ireland and King of Brega. He belonged to the Síl nÁedo Sláine kindred of the southern Uí Néill which took its name from his grandfather Áed Sláine (died 602).

672

- Cenn Fáelad mac Blathmaic (died 675) followed his father Blathmac mac Áedo Sláine (died 665) and his brother Sechnassach (died 671) as High King of Ireland and king of Brega.

673

- Cenn Fáelad mac Blathmaic ended his reign as High King.

674

- Death of Congal Cennfota mac Dúnchada, a Dal Fiatach king of Ulaid. He was the son of Dùnchad mac Fiachnai (died 644). His nickname Cennfota means Long-headed.

675

- Death of Cenn Fáelad mac Blathmaic.

676

- Fínsnechta Fledach (died 695) of the Síl nÁedo Sláine destroyed Ailech, center of Cenél nEógain power.

677

- At the Battle of Loch Gabor (Lagore, County Meath) the Laigin fought with the high king Fínsnechta Fledach. There was slaughter on both sides but Finsnechta emerged the victor.

678

- Death of King of Munster Colgú mac Faílbe Flaind

679

- Death of Cenn Fáelad mac Aillila, Irish scholar and poet and grandson of Colmán Rímid.

== 680s ==
680

- Death of Fiannamail mac Máele Tuile, a King of Leinster from the Uí Máil branch of the Laigin.

681

- Death of Dúngal Eilni mac Scandail a Dal nAraide king of the Cruithne. He came to the rule of these tribes some time after 668. In 681 he and Cenn Fáelad mac Suibne, chief of Cianachta Glinne Geimhin were burned by Máel Dúin mac Máel Fithrich of the Cenél nEógan at Dún Ceithirn.

682

- Death of Cenn Fáelad mac Colgan, a King of Connacht from the Uí Briúin branch of the Connachta. He was of the branch which developed into the Uí Briúin Seóla, who were centred around Tuam in modern County Galway.

683

- Death of Dúnchad Muirisci mac Tipraite, a King of Connacht from the Uí Fiachrach branch of the Connachta. He was of the Uí Fiachrach Muaidhe sept based along the River Moy.

684

- June: King Ecgfrith of Northumbria sent an expedition to Ireland under his ealdorman Berht, laying waste to the territory of Fínsnechta Fledach, King of Brega.

685

- Bressal mac Fergusa, son of Fergus mac Áedáin King of Ulaid died of disease which was rampant at the time.

688

- Fínsnechta Fledach abdicated as king of Brega and High King of Ireland to become a monk. He reclaimed the crowns the following year, 689, and abandoned monasticism.
- At the Battle of Imlech Pich, Niall mac Cernaig Sotal (died 701), a king in southern Brega of the Uí Chernaig sept of Lagore of the Síl nÁedo Sláine defeated Congalach mac Conaing Cuirre (died 696) of Uí Chonaing and his Ciannachta allies.

== 690s ==
690

- Death of Aillil mac Dúngail Eilni, a chief of the Dal nAraide and son of Dúngal Eilni mac Scandail (died 681)

691

- Death of Fithceallach mac Flainn, a king Uí Maine

692

- Death of Fergus mac Áedáin, a king of Ulaid from 674. He was the first member of the Dal nAraide to hold the throne since death of Congal Cáech at Mag Roth in 639. He was of the Ui Echach Coba branch of the Dal nAraide and was the son of Áedán mac Mongain (died 616).

693

- Death of Bran Mut mac Conaill, a King of Leinster from the Uí Dúnlainge branch of the Laigin. He was the grandson of Fáelán mac Colmáin (died 666), a previous king. He ruled from 680 until his death.

694

- Loingsech mac Óengusso (died 704), an Irish king, becomes High King of Ireland. The Chronicle of Ireland records the beginning of Loingsech's reign as 696, having recorded the killing of his predecessor Fínsnechta Fledach the year previously.

695

- Death of Fínsnechta Fledach mac Dúnchada, High King of Ireland, who belonged to the southern Síl nÁedo Sláine sept of the Uí Néill and was King of Brega in modern County Meath.

696

- 17 June: death of Saint Moling, the second Bishop of Ferns. The town of Monamolin in County Wexford is named for him.
- Death of Finguine mac Cathail Con-cen-máthair, a King of Munster from the Glendamnach branch of the Eoganachta.
- Death of Congalach mac Conaing Cuirre, a King of Brega from the Uí Chonaing sept of the Síl nÁedo Sláine branch of the southern Uí Néill.

697

- Synod of Birr and the proclamation of the Cáin Adomnáin (Law of the Innocents).

698

- Death of Áed Aired, a king of the Dal nAraide.

== 700s ==
700

- End of archaic Old Irish period (from c. AD 500)
