= Crimthann mac Áedo =

Crimthann mac Áedo (died 633) was a King of Leinster from the Uí Máil branch of the Laigin. He was the son of Áed Dibchine mac Senaig (died 595), a previous king. He would have succeeded sometime after the death of Rónán mac Colmáin. His brother Rónán Crach was possibly the Leinster king mentioned in the saga "Fingal Rónáin" (The Kinslaying of Rónán) and is also said to have been a bishop who was slain by Crimthann.

In 626 the Ui Neill laid siege to a prince of the Ui Cheinnselaig named Crundmáel Bolg Luatha (died 628). This same prince was slain by Crimthann's rival Fáelán mac Colmáin of the Uí Dúnlainge at the Battle of Duma Aichir in 628. Also, in that year the new high king Domnall mac Áedo (died 642) of the Cenél Conaill ravaged Leinster.

Crimthann was defeated and slain at the Battle of Áth Goan in western Liffey by an alliance of his rival Faelan of the Ui Dunlainge with Faílbe Flann mac Áedo Duib (died 637), the king of Munster and Conall Guthbinn mac Suibni (died 635) of the Clann Cholmáin. The Clann Cholmáin aided the Ui Dunlainge rise to power in Leinster to further their ambitions in Meath. A Munster tract claims that Faílbe paid the tribute of the Laigin to the Ui Neill but Byrne dismisses this as later Munster propaganda to claim Leth Moga (the southern half of Ireland).

== See also ==
- Kings of Leinster
