= Maine mac Néill =

8th century King of Brega

Maine mac Néill (died 712) was a king in southern Brega of the Uí Chernaig sept of Lagore of the Síl nÁedo Sláine. He was the son of Niall mac Cernaig Sotal (died 701) and great-grandson of the high king Diarmait mac Áedo Sláine (died 665).

Maine is listed as one of the guarantors of the Cáin Adomnáin ("Law of the Innocents") of Saint Adomnán arranged at the Synod of Birr in 697 during his father's lifetime. In his time a feud broke out among the Síl nÁedo Sláine between the Uí Chernaig sept and the northern septs of Uí Chonaing of Cnogba (Knowth) and the Síl nDlúthaig of Fir Cúl. In 701 Maine's father Niall had been killed by the Uí Chonaing king of Brega, Írgalach mac Conaing Cuirre (died 702).

His brother Fogartach mac Néill (died 724) held power as well and was defeated at the Battle of Claenath, fought near Clane in modern County Kildare by Cellach Cualann (died 715), the King of Leinster in 704. His brother Fogartach was able to hold the kingship of all Brega at times.

Maine himself was slain in battle in 712 as part of the Síl nÁedo Sláine feud by Flann mac Áedo (died 714) of the Síl nDlúthaig.
