= Congal Cennmagair =

High King of Ireland

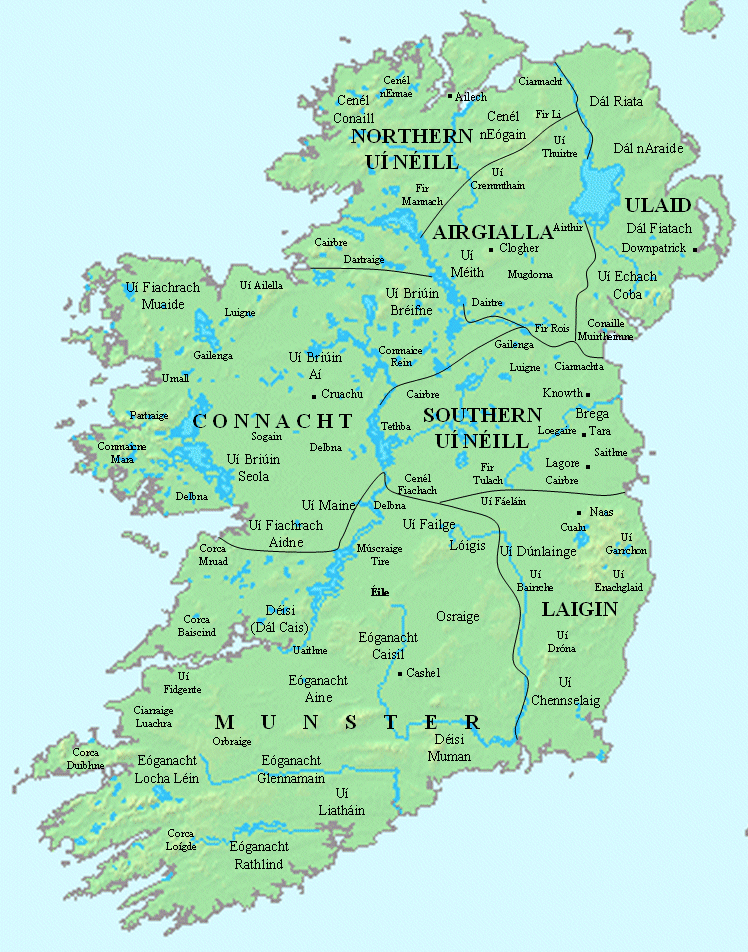
Peoples and kingdoms of Early Christian Ireland.

Congal Cennmagair (died 710) was High King of Ireland. He belonged to the northern Cenél Conaill branch of the Uí Néill. His father, Fergus Fanát, was not a high king, although his grandfather, Domnall mac Áedo (died 642), was counted as a High King of Ireland.

Congal's predecessor was Loingsech mac Óengusso, his paternal first cousin, who died in battle in 703. Congal reigned as high king from 703 to 710.

Congal was a guarantor of Adomnán's "law of the innocents"—the Cáin Adomnáin—agreed at the Synod of Birr in 697. He is the second lay guarantor listed after Loingsech and is called King of Tyrconell, though these titles may have been added later.

The reigns of Loingsech and Congal represented the peak of Cenél Conaill, thereafter eclipsed by the rival kinsmen the Cenél nEógain. Both appear to have attempted to expand into Connacht, with mixed results. Loingsech died in the pursuit of this goal, while in Congal's reign a notable victory was won against the men of Connacht in 707 and the Connacht king Indrechtach mac Dúnchado was slain. Congal himself did not participate in this battle but Loingsech's son Fergal did.

In the same year Congal himself campaigned in Leinster. Geoffrey Keating's Foras Feasa ar Éirinn records that he burned the church of Kildare during this and implies his death was related to this.

Congal himself died suddenly in 710. A gloss to the Annals of Ulster adds that this was due to a fit. Congal left a number of sons, none of whom was especially prominent. These sons included Flann Gohan (died 732) and Conaing (died 733) who were slain in warfare between Cenél Conaill and Cenél nEógain and a son named Donngal (died 731). He was followed as High King by another northerner, Fergal mac Máele Dúin (died 722) of the Cenél nEógain.
