= Fiannamail mac Máele Tuile =

Fiannamail mac Máele Tuile (died 680) was a King of Leinster from the Uí Máil branch of the Laigin. He was the great-grandson of Áed Dibchine mac Senaig (died 595), a previous king and grandson of Rónán Crach, possibly the Leinster king mentioned in the saga "Fingal Rónáin" (The Kinslaying of Rónán).

His exact accession date is uncertain. The Book of Leinster gives him a reign of 13 years and the death obit of Fáelán mac Colmáin (died 666) is given as 666 in the Irish annals.

In 677 the Laigin fought with the high king Fínsnechta Fledach (died 695) of the Síl nÁedo Sláine at the Battle of Loch Gabor (Lagore, County Meath). There was mutual slaughter on both sides but Finsnechta emerged the victor. In 680 Fiannamail was slain by one of his own people named Foichsechán at the instigation of the high king Finsnechta.

Fiannamail was ancestor to the Uí Théig (O'Tighe) north of Uí Máil territory just west of the Wicklow Mountains.

He is a recurring character in Peter Tremayne's Sister Fidelma mysteries.

== See also ==
- Kings of Leinster
