= Eterscél mac Máele Umai =

Eterscél mac Máele Umai (d. 721) was a king of Munster from the Eóganacht Áine branch of the Eóganachta. He was the grandson of Cúán mac Amalgado (d. 641), a previous king.

There is confusion in the sources between his reign and that of Ailill mac Cathail Con-cen-máthair (d. 701). Both are mentioned as kings in Senchas Fagbála Caisil ("The Story of the Finding of Cashel"), but only Etarscel is mentioned in the Laud Synchronisms and the Book of Leinster. However, Aillil's reign is attested in the annals. Also, in the list of signatories to the signing of Adomnán's Law of the Innocents at Birr, County Offaly in 697; Eterscel is named king of Munster.

According to a genealogical tract, Etarscel had a brother Uisneach who was heir apparent to the Munster throne until slain by his brother through envy and hatred and then Etarscel assumed the kingship of Munster

He abdicated around 702 after ruling for 6 years. He may have spent his retirement in the religious life. His son Cathussach mac Eterscélai was a later king of Munster in 742, although he is only known from the king lists.

== See also ==
- Kings of Munster

Eterscél mac Máele Umai Eóganachta
Regnal titles
Preceded by Finguine mac Cathail	King of Cashel c. 696 – 702 with Ailill mac Cathail (c. 696–701)	Succeeded by Cormac mac Ailello
