= Sister Fidelma mysteries =

Series of novels set in 7th century Ireland

The Sister Fidelma mysteries are a series of historical mystery novels and short stories by Peter Tremayne (pseudonym of Peter Berresford Ellis) about a fictional detective who is the eponymous heroine of a series. Fidelma is both a dalaigh (an advocate in the courts of the Five Kingdoms of Éireann), and Celtic nun (Ellis uses the French term "religieuse").

The Sister Fidelma stories are set in the middle to late 7th century, mainly in Ireland. They are historical whodunits in the literary tradition of Umberto Eco's The Name of the Rose, the Brother Cadfael mysteries by Ellis Peters, and the Judge Dee mysteries by Robert van Gulik (inspired by Gong'an fiction and by the official of the Chinese Tang Dynasty Di Renjie). Peter Tremayne's novels usually feature the interaction of several subplots involving political intrigue, personal relationships, religious conflict, or characters' desires for personal or monetary gain.

Fidelma usually solves crimes in company with Brother Eadulf, a Saxon monk (Ellis uses the French term "religieux"). Though Eadulf has often been compared to Sherlock Holmes's friend Dr. Watson, he is in fact more of an equal partner to Fidelma and usually proves essential to solving the mystery at hand (in fact, in the story of The Leper's Bell he solves one of the main problems himself). A true companion, he has saved Fidelma's life more than once.

== Main characters ==
=== Sister Fidelma ===
Fidelma is usually described as attractive with "a tall, yet a well-proportioned figure" (described so in many of the short stories), with pale skin, red hair (strands of which have been known to "rebelliously" escape from under her hood or head-dress) and either green, grey-green or blue-green eyes (the short stories use these different descriptions). She was born into the royal family of Munster in the late 630s; her father, King Failbe Fland, died c. 637/9, during Fidelma's infancy. Fidelma was raised as an Eoghanacht princess. She studied civil and criminal law, especially the Brehon laws, under the supervision of Brehon Morann of Tara. During her student years, Fidelma had an unhappy love affair with Cian, a warrior of the High King's bodyguard, who eventually abandoned her to marry the daughter of the High King's steward (who, ironically, later divorced him on the grounds that he was sterile). Her pre-occupation with Cian interfered with her concentration and devotion to her studies, and nearly caused her to be expelled from the Brehon Morann's classes. Emerging from the affair battered but unbowed, she applied herself wholeheartedly to her studies and eventually qualified as an anruth, the second highest rank after an Ollamh in the Irish legal system. In the novels and short stories, she pursues a career as a dalaigh to the Brehon Court of Ireland.

In 659, while still studying at Brehon Morann's law school, Fidelma traveled to visit Lúach, an old friend, but found upon her arrival that Lúach had been missing for five days. Fidelma undertook an investigation into her friend's disappearance, but found more questions than answers, especially from those closest to Lúach (see the e-novella Lair of the White Fox).

After her studies were complete, on the advice of her mentor Abbot Laisran of Durrow Fidelma became a nun (referred to throughout the series as a "religieuse"), joining St. Brigid's mixed abbey at Cill Dara (Kildare). She later left this community some time after her return from Rome for reasons outlined in the story "Hemlock at Vespers", and now refers to herself as "Fidelma of Cashel" rather than "Sister Fidelma". Strong-minded and independent, Fidelma often chafes at the structure of the religious life; she seems to have become a religieuse more as a career move (monasteries were the intellectual centers of seventh-century Ireland) than as an expression of Christian devotion; in the novel A Prayer for the Damned, Fidelma considers renouncing her religious vows but decides against it. Fidelma's anam chara or "soul friend" (the Irish equivalent of a confessor and spiritual guide) had been her friend Liadin, as Fidelma had been to her, but Liadin later betrayed and broke her oath to Fidelma (see the short story "At the Tent of Holofernes" in the short story collection Hemlock at Vespers). Since that time Fidelma had no real anam chara, but in The Leper's Bell she realized that she had unknowingly come to regard Eadulf as her anam chara and finally recognized him as such. Even so, she continued to seek advice from clerical mentors, particularly Abbot Laisran and Brother Conchobar of Cashel.

In 664, Fidelma accompanied the Irish delegation as an advisor on law to the Synod of Whitby, where she met Brother Eadulf (quite literally running into him); later, they were asked to work together to investigate the murder of Abbess Etain of Kildare, a leading member of the Church of Columba faction (see Absolution by Murder). Following a little initial hostility on Fidelma's part towards Eadulf, the murderer was uncovered, and after the Synod concluded Fidelma and Eadulf journeyed together to Rome, where they were asked to investigate the murder of Archbishop-designate Wighard (see Shroud for the Archbishop). After the case was successfully resolved, Fidelma returned to Cashel, being forced on the way to stop at the seaport of Genua (Genoa), then traveling to the Abbey of Bobium (Bobbio Abbey) to visit her old teacher Brother Ruadán and becoming involved in the events of Behold a Pale Horse.

In 665, Fidelma's cousin King Cathal Cú-cen-máthair died of the Yellow Plague and Fidelma's older brother Colgu succeeded to the throne of Muman (Munster) (the historical King Colgu ruled from A.D. 665–678), and in the wake of her brother's succession Fidelma became involved in solving the murder of famed religious scholar the Venerable Dacan (see Suffer Little Children).

In 666 when Fidelma was called upon to investigate the finding of a headless body in an abbey well, she also became involved with the mystery of a deserted Gaulish ship on which (she learned) Eadulf had been traveling to Cashel as an emissary of Theodore of Tarsus, the new Archbishop of Canterbury, and from which he and the entire crew had been taken captive (see The Subtle Serpent). Returning to Cashel together after rescuing Eadulf, revealing the murderer and uncovering a plot against Munster, Fidelma and Eadulf soon became nearly inseparable (see The Spider's Web, Valley of the Shadow [at which time Fidelma was made a member of the Nasc Naidh, an elite corps of bodyguards to the kings of Munster, by King Colgu and became entitled to wear the golden torc of that order] and The Monk Who Vanished). After nearly a year together, they again separated, with Eadulf (reluctantly) intending to return to Canterbury and Fidelma intending to go on a pilgrimage to the Shrine of St. James in Iberia.

Events didn't go quite as planned. Fidelma had only just arrived in Iberia after a very eventful voyage (see Act of Mercy) when she received a message from her brother Colgu that Eadulf had been charged with murder. Hurrying back to Ireland, she reunited with Eadulf at the Abbey of Fearna, proved his innocence and uncovered the true killer as well as the reasons behind the crime (see Our Lady of Darkness). Eadulf then convinced Fidelma to accompany him to Canterbury and then, after their business with Archbishop Theodore had been accomplished, to visit his former home of Seaxmund's Ham (see Smoke in the Wind, "The Lost Eagle" in the short story collection Whispers of the Dead and The Haunted Abbot). At some point during their travels, they revealed their true feelings for and to one another, began a physical relationship (resulting in Fidelma's pregnancy) and entered into a temporary marriage of a year and a day (with Fidelma as Eadulf's ben charrthach or "loved woman" and Eadulf as Fidelma's fer comtha); this marriage is first mentioned in The Haunted Abbot, which takes place in late December, 666. After their return to Cashel in 667, their son Alchu ("Gentle Hound") was born sometime between June and July of that year.

The last three months of 667 turned rocky; Fidelma and Eadulf's relationship was seriously troubled by Fidelma's suffering from (but refusing to admit suffering from) what is now called postpartum depression. While Fidelma and Eadulf were away solving a series of serial killings (see Badger's Moon), Alchu's nurse was found murdered outside the castle of Cashel and Alchu was missing, believed to have been kidnapped. Despite objections that they were too emotionally involved to investigate properly and what turned out to be a false trail meant to implicate the Uí Fidgente, Eadulf was able to track down and successfully recover Alchu and Fidelma uncovered the real reason why Alchu's nurse had been murdered (see The Leper's Bell). In February 668, they celebrated a permanent marriage, despite the interruption caused by their investigation into the murder of Abbot Ultan of Cill Ria (Kilrea) (see A Prayer for the Damned). After the events of Dancing with Demons in the winter of 669–670, Eadulf was also made a member of the Nasc Naidh.

Fidelma became increasingly involved in Irish court politics and diplomacy, including thwarting several plots against the kingdom of Munster, solving the murder of the High King Sechnassach (see Dancing with Demons) and in 670 (although originally requested to act as advisor to the Irish delegation) uncovering the murderer of the Abbot Dabhoc of Tulach Oc at the Council of Autun summoned by Bishop Leodegar (see The Council of the Cursed). She and Eadulf were returning to Muman by sea in the company of Fidelma's cousin Bressel when their ship was attacked off the coast of Armorica and Bressel was brutally murdered, along with some of the ship's crew. After uncovering both the person responsible and a plot to assassinate the Breton king (see The Dove of Death), Fidelma decided to renounce her religious vows and become full-time legal advisor to her brother, a decision she believed Eadulf would support. Her belief proved wrong and led to a bitter quarrel between them, resulting in a physical separation with Fidelma remaining in Cashel and Eadulf going to the Abbey of Ruan. During the weeks of the separation and due to Muman's Chief Brehon Baithen's intentions of retiring because of a serious (ultimately fatal) illness, Fidelma became determined to succeed Baithen as Chief Brehon of Muman, and Colgu agreed to have her name submitted among the other candidates (although he informed her that he must remain neutral and that the final decision must lie with the Council of Brehons).

The murder of Brother Donnchad at the abbey of Lios Mor led Colgu and Abbot Segdae to send Fidelma to investigate but on the condition that Eadulf accompany and assist her (see The Chalice of Blood). Although they were able to work together as before, the breach was evident and after the investigation was successfully concluded, Fidelma followed through with her decision/ambition and left the religious. Unfortunately, although her name was submitted, Brehon Aedo was elected as Muman's Chief Brehon, a decision which Fidelma took very hard (although publicly she supported the decision), and Eadulf (who had finally accepted her decision to leave the religious, although he himself remained a Brother) was extremely relieved when she agreed to undertake the investigation of an unknown found body, which led towards uncovering another plot against Muman and an unexpected traitor within Fidelma's own family (see The Seventh Trumpet). However, Fidelma eventually concluded that the role and duties of Muman's Chief Brehon were not for her and decided to remain a dalaigh, although she continued to be Colgu's legal advisor.

In November 670, Colgu was nearly assassinated by a mysterious religieux but survived, although badly wounded; the assassin also killed Chief Brehon Aedo, who had tried to protect Colgu. The would-be assassin was killed, but the initial investigation into the motive for the attack (originally handled by Deputy Chief Brehon Aillin) seemed to point towards the Uí Fidgente, and so, with the approval of Colgu's tanaiste (heir apparent) Finguine, Fidelma and Eadulf traveled into enemy territory to continue their investigation and uncovered not only the reason for the attack on Colgu but also a plot against the Uí Fidgente from within their own ruling family (see Atonement of Blood).

In February 671, Colgu had recovered from his wound and Fidelma and Eadulf had been living somewhat peacefully in Cashel when an Anglo-Saxon deputation led by the Venerable Verax, brother of Pope Vitalian, and the arrogant Bishop Arwald of Magonsaete arrived at Cashel to debate the possible establishment by Rome of an archbishopric in Ireland and which primacy in the Five Kingdoms might be considered as its seat. Matters took a serious turn before the debate even began by the murder of Brother Cerdic, the delegation's emissary, before the delegation's arrival and became even more complicated by the discovery on the banks of the River Siur of three murdered men, one of whom was identified as The Venerable Vitricius of Palestrina, and that the only survivor was Eadulf's younger brother Egric. The debate quickly turned hostile; shortly afterwards, an attempt was made on Fidelma and Eadulf's lives and more murders were committed, including those of Rudgal (the man suspected of leading the attack on The Venerable Vitricius), of Sister Dianaihm (the bann-mhoar or female steward of Abbess Lioch of Cill Naile (Killenaule), who had been asked to attend the debate) and of Egric. With Muman's honor at stake, Fidelma and Eadulf had to somehow unravel the truth and the reasons for so many killings (see The Devil's Seal).

In May 671, preparations for the Great Fair of Bealtain in Cashel took a sinister turn when Eadulf and Aidan, while returning to Cashel, came across a partially burned wagon containing two bodies, a female (the driver of the wagon) disguised in male clothing and a male inside the wagon who appeared to have been dead for several days. Further examination determined the burning to be a case of arson and the two deaths due to poisoning. The investigation took Fidelma and Eadulf to Osraige and to the Abbey of Cainnech, where they strove to uncover the secrets of both the Golden Stone and the mysterious Fellowship of the Raven (see The Second Death).

In June 671, Fidelma and Eadulf were horrified to learn from Colgu that Abbot Segdae had been murdered while at the fortress of Prince Donennach of the Ui Fidgente. In the absence of Muman's Chief Brehon, Colgu immediately dispatched Fidelma and Eadulf; upon their arrival, they learned to their shock that their companion Gorman, who had been found at the scene of the crime, was being held as the chief suspect and that the Ui Fidgente religious, led by the vicious and vindictive Abbot Nannid of Mungairit, were demanding Gorman's death as punishment according to the Penitentials. With the backing of both Prince Donennach and the Ui Fidgente Chief Brehon Faolchair, Fidelma and Eadulf immediately began an investigation, knowing that any misstep on Fidelma's part could not only result in Gorman's execution but also spark both a civil upheaval within the Ui Fidgente and a war against Cashel (see Penance of the Damned).

In November 671, just before the eve of the feast of Samhain, Eadulf and Aidan discovered a man murdered in an unlit pyre, dressed in the robes of a religieux and killed by the ritualistic "three deaths". When a strange woman known as "Brancheó" appeared in a raven-feather cloak foretelling of the ancient gods returning to exact revenge upon the mortal world, she was quickly branded a suspect. In their search for the killer, Sister Fidelma and Eadulf discovered that their investigation was linked to a book stolen from the Papal Secret Archives which could destroy the New Faith in the Five Kingdoms (see Night of the Lightbringer).

As 671 drew to a close, Fidelma traveled to the Abbey of Finnbarr on a personal secret mission to question the abbot, but found that he had been murdered and the suspect, a young girl, had fled. In spite of Fidelma's refusal to reveal her real purposes (which she had sworn an oath to not reveal) to Eadulf and her other companions, they agreed to accompany her on this investigation. However, vicious rumors began to circulate of a plot by Fidelma's family, the Eoghannacht, to murder the High King and kidnap his wife, and Fidelma's refusal to confide even in Eadulf meant that not only that Fidelma's life was in danger but also that she would be truly on her own to face what was to happen (see Bloodmoon).

The year 672 proved to be another year of mystery and political intrigue for Fidelma and Eadulf. In February, Fidelma and Eadulf were traveling from the Abbey of Lios Mhor back to Cashel when they reached the village of Cloichin just in time to prevent the lynching, presided over by Brother Gadra (a firm adherent of the Penitentials), of a man accused of murdering a local farmer, his wife and two sons. Determined that the man, a foreign vagrant, should be given a fair trial, Fidelma and Eadulf remained in the area, but events, including a claimant to the murdered farmer's inheritance, began to spiral into a far more sinister pattern that would cost more lives (see Blood in Eden).

In Spring 672, the body of Brother Brocc, who had been traveling with Princess Gelgeis, King Colgu's betrothed, on a secret mission, was found and brought to the Abbey of Gleann Da Loch. Fidelma, Eadulf and Enda were dispatched to the kingdom of Laigin to discover the truth, but were soon confronted by more deaths, warnings of demonic shapeshifters and brigands stealing gold and silver from the ancient mines, and rumors of a war between the Kingdoms of Laigin and Muman (see The Shapeshifter's Lair).

In May 672, just before the Feast of Beltaine, a council of the seven senior princes of the kingdom of Muman was to gather at Cashel to discuss King Colgú's policies. Before the council actually met, Brother Conchobhar, the keeper of the sacred sword that symbolized the King's authority to rule, was found murdered. While trying to solve this mystery and as rumors of an attempt to overthrow Colgú began to spread, Fidelma and Eadulf also had to contend with news that a plague ship had landed at a nearby port (see The House of Death).

Later that same month, during the renovation of the abbey of Muman at Imleach Iubhair, Fidelma and Eadulf were called in to investigate both the destruction of the guest hostel by fire and the death of one of the guests: Bishop Brodulf of Luxovium, cousin to the King of Franks, whom they discovered had been stabbed to death before the fire had even started (see Death of a Heretic).

In the summer of 672, shortly after the marriage of Colgu and Princess Gelgeis, a member of Princess Gelgeis' personal bodyguard, a group of female warriors called "the Daughters of the Storm", was found killed in their locked sleeping chamber, and shortly afterwards the stewardess of the royal house was poisoned. With a huge group of suspects, Fidelma and Eadulf had to work quickly to uncover the killer (see Revenge of the Stormbringer).

In 675, Fidelma received a letter telling of the ultimate fates of Bishop Leodegar and some of those connected with the 670 Council of Autun (see the epilogue of The Council of the Cursed).

Because of the death of her parents at an early age, Fidelma grew up quite independent and self-reliant; at times she refuses to delegate gathering of evidence to anyone, even Eadfulf (although she does admit that Eadulf's "mind was just as sharp and penetrating as her own." - The Council of the Cursed). However, she suffered many betrayals in the past (Cian, Liadin, Abbess Ita of Cill Dara) so that she became extremely cautious with her emotions and it is not easy for her to become close to people; it took quite a long time for her to fully realize her feelings for Eadulf, and her only close female friend/confidente is Della, a former prostitute (it is to Della that she turns to for comfort and counsel when she believes her marriage to Eadulf is in danger of falling apart in The Leper's Bell). She also admits quite freely that one of her worst faults is her temper, and she is constantly amazed that Eadulf shows so much patience with her: "She knew that she could not really contemplate an existence without Eadulf's support. Who else would tolerate her sharp temper, which she accepted was her biggest fault?" (The Chalice of Blood)

However, in spite of her self-confessed shortcomings, she has proven herself to be devoted to family and friends and a caring and loving wife and mother (although she does wish that her duties as a dalaigh didn't cause her to be away from her son so often and for so long).

=== Brother Eadulf ===
Brother Eadulf has appeared in all but three of the Sister Fidelma novels and in one short story ("The Lost Eagle").

An Angle by birth from Seaxmund's Ham (today "Saxmundham") in the Kingdom of East Anglia (Eadulf refers to himself as an "Angle", while almost everybody else refers to him as "Saxon", much to his annoyance), Eadulf was raised as a hereditary gerefa, or reeve, of his people. Eadulf was converted to Christianity by an Irish monk named Fursa sometime before the novels begin and subsequently educated in Ireland, studying first at Daru (Durrow) then medicine at the great medical school of Tuaim Brecain. He then undertook a pilgrimage to Rome to understand the differences between the ideas of the Church of Rome and those of the Church of Ireland, remaining there studying for two years and returning as a follower of Rome. In the novel The Devil's Seal, it is learned that he has a younger brother Egric, who, although both brothers were converted to Christianity, chose to follow the path of the warrior and that due to lack of news about him Eadulf believed Egric to be dead. It is also revealed in the same novel that Eadulf's mother died from ergot poisoning when Eadulf was fifteen and that his father died from the Yellow Plague three years later.

In the novel Absolution by Murder, which is set during the Synod of Whitby, Brother Eadulf was part of the deputation from Canterbury to the Synod, where he met Sister Fidelma for the first time. After the Synod's conclusion, both joined a party to Rome. After the events of Shroud for the Archbishop in Rome, Fidelma returned to Ireland while Eadulf remained in Rome as secretary to the new Archbishop of Canterbury Theodore of Tarsus. Later, he was sent to Cashel as Theodore's emissary and was reunited with Fidelma in The Subtle Serpent. After the events of that novel, he returned to Cashel with Fidelma and in subsequent novels they became almost inseparable companions and collaborators.

Eadulf and Fidelma's intellectual and personal relationship develops throughout the series, despite another separation in which Eadulf (reluctantly and partly at Fidelma's insistence) intended to return to Canterbury. However, he almost never made it back to Britain, as at the Abbey of Fearna he was charged with rape and murder and almost hanged (a predicament from which it seemed that Fidelma would be unable to rescue him). Eadulf convinced Fidelma to accompany him to Canterbury, and after concluding his business with Archbishop Theodore, he returned to Ireland with Fidelma. In 667, they entered into a trial marriage of a year and a day, during which their son Alchu was born. In February 668, Eadulf and Fidelma celebrated a permanent marriage (see A Prayer for the Damned).

Unfortunately, as time passed, Eadulf's devotion to the world of the Faith began to clash with Fidelma's growing ambition to pursue a secular life devoted to the law. A serious emotional and physical breach was made between them when Fidelma announced her decision to renounce her religious vows and Eadulf sadly realized that he could not change her mind (see The Dove of Death and The Chalice of Blood). The Chalice of Blood concluded with Fidelma telling Eadulf that she had made her decision about her future and now he must come to a decision about his own, which he did ... accepting her decision and supporting her, but still remaining a Brother.

Tremayne uses Brother Eadulf's status as an outsider to the Celtic communities in which many of his and Fidelma's cases take place to provide explanations about legal and cultural matters to his readers. This allows Tremayne to include many details about the history of the Celtic church and society, without overtly appearing to educate.

Being a foreigner, Eadulf's status in Ireland is originally that of cu glas (which translates as "grey dog"), meaning an "exile from over the sea" and a person without legal standing or honor price (for a definition of this term, see "Status" in Early Irish Law); however, his rank as techtaire (emissary or ambassador) between Archbishop Theodore and Fidelma's brother King Colgu gave him a high honor price of eight cumals (a cumal being the value of three cows) under Irish law (see Our Lady of Darkness) and since his marriage to Fidelma (recognized and approved by her family) he is now considered a deorad De (an "exile of God") and has an honor price of half that of Fidelma's but he is not entitled to make legal contracts without her permission (she is also responsible for any debts that he might incur) or have any legal responsibility in the raising of Alchu. Despite these legalities, he is treated as an equal and a friend and accepted as a member of Fidelma's family. After the events of Dancing with Demons in the winter of 669–670, he was made a member of the Nasc Naidh, an elite corps of bodyguards to the kings of Munster, by King Colgu and entitled to wear the golden torc of that order.

Brother Eadulf is a stolid man who provides a much-needed stability to Fidelma during emotionally difficult cases (he knows that her insecurity stems from both her parents dying when she was very young). In many of the novels, Tremayne uses the same phrases (with some slight variations) to describe Fidelma and Eadulf's intellectual relationship:

"She missed their debates. She missed the way she could tease Eadulf over their conflicting opinions and philosophies, the way he would always rise goodnaturedly to the bait. Their arguments would rage but there was no enmity between them. They would learn together as they examined their interpretations and debated their ideas." (Suffer Little Children)

Eadulf's courage and love of family are undeniable (proven many times, including his rescue of their son Alchu in The Leper's Bell and of Fidelma herself in The Seventh Trumpet). His medical knowledge and assistance is often very valuable as well (especially in The Devil's Seal when he must perform an emergency amputation), and Fidelma has often admitted that Eadulf has an uncanny ability to see the obvious that she has overlooked. On one occasion (after a "cram course" in the Law of the Fenechus) he acted as Fidelma's advocate to successfully get her released when she was charged with murder (see Valley of the Shadow), although his use of a bluff to get a witness to admit to being paid for his testimony, thus discrediting it, it shocked her sensibilities as a dalaigh, and he was able to provide a provision of law (much to Fidelma's surprise) that allowed her to provide an argument that led to the uncovering of a murderer (see The Chalice of Blood). In The Seventh Trumpet, he demonstrated his own powers of deduction to such a degree that Fidelma remarks, "Every day, you become more and more a Brehon"; in The Chalice of Blood, she tells him: "As far as I am concerned, without you, your advice, your ability to analyse, I would not have succeeded in many of the investigations we have undertaken ... you will forever be my soul-mate, my anam chara, and if you go my soul will die."

Part of Eadulf's charm is his honest humility, and despite all he has accomplished and the fame and respect he has earned while working with Fidelma he considers himself to be quite an ordinary man (much to the amusement of Brother Conchobar, who in A Prayer for the Damned points out to him that Fidelma would never have chosen an ordinary man to share her life with). He is not a person who always feels comfortable in the hustle and bustle of a major castle town like Cashel, and often wishes that he and Fidelma could retire to a mixed religious community in a more secluded area (although that dream had to be given up when Fidelma renounced the religious life). He is very humorous about his own shortcomings (including poor horsemanship and seasickness) and is normally a very tolerant and even-tempered person, but on a few occasions Eadulf has been provoked to the point where he has indeed lost his temper with another person and with Fidelma herself, much to her astonishment (see The Leper's Bell and The Chalice of Blood). Nominally he remains an adherent to the Church of Rome (he still wears a Roman tonsure), but over time, due in part to his debates with Fidelma, in part to his long-term residence and personal experiences in Eireann and in part to his personal interactions with both local and foreign Church dignitaries, his views have become much more moderate to the point where he has realized that he cannot blindly follow the changes in the Faith that come from Rome, such as and including the increased call for religious celibacy and the continual attempt to supplant the Laws of the Fenechus with the Penitentials.

== Recurring characters ==
- Colgú mac Faílbe Flaind - King of Muman (Munster), reigned 665–678; Fidelma's older brother. His first appearance in the series is in Suffer Little Children.
- Brother Conchobar - the apothecary at Cashel, also expert in astrology; sometimes acts a mentor to Fidelma. His first appearance in the series is in The Monk Who Vanished, but he also appears in the short story "The Astrologer who Predicted His Own Murder" in the collection Whispers of the Dead. His murder is one of the main plotlines in The House of Death.
- Laisran - Abbot of Durrow; mentor to Fidelma, originally encouraged her to join the religious; appears mostly in the short stories, such as "Whispers of the Dead", "Who Stole the Fish", "Gold at Night", "A canticle for Wulfstan", but also appears in A Prayer for the Damned.
- Gorman - a warrior of Munster's Nasc Niadh, the King of Muman's Bodyguard; the son of former prostitute Della; accompanies Fidelma and Eadulf on some of their investigations. His first appearance in the series is in The Leper's Bell; eventually promoted to commander of the Nasc Niadh; married Aibell prior to the events of Penance of the Damned.
- Dego, Enda and Aidan - warriors of Munster's Nasc Niadh, the King of Muman's Bodyguard; they sometimes accompany Fidelma and Eadulf on their investigations. Their first appearance in the series is in Our Lady of Darkness. In The Devil's Seal, Dego was attacked and wounded in the right arm, and due to massive infection Eadulf was forced to amputate the arm. Enda later takes over from Gorman as accompanier of Fidelma and Eadulf on their investigations, and at some time between the events of The House of Death and Death of a Heretic also takes over from Gorman as commander of the Nasc Niadh.
- Della - a former be-taide (prostitute), mother of Gorman and Fidelma's closest female friend and confidente; they became acquainted when Fidelma successfully defended Della's sister, a religieuse of Cill Dara (Kildare), against a charge or murder and later represented Della herself when Della was raped. Her first appearance in the series is in The Monk Who Vanished.
- Segdae - Abbot and Bishop of Imleach, chief prelate in Muman and firm opponent of the Penitentials. First introduced in Valley of the Shadow; murdered in Penance of the Damned.
- Conri - Warlord of the Uí Fidgenti. First appeared in the short story "Cry Wolf"; became a more substantive character in the novel Badger's Moon. He has a fairly substantial role in Master of Souls.
- Donennach mac Oengus - Prince of the Ui Fidgenti; first appeared in The Monk Who Vanished. Signed a peace treaty with Colgu and has since remained on friendly relations with Cashel despite opposition from within his own people.
- Forbassach - Bishop and Brehon of Laigin and a hostile antagonist to Fidelma; first appeared in Suffer Little Children (when he was physically ejected from the court of Cashel for violation of the laws of hospitality); was stripped of his rank and his license to practice law by the Chief Brehon of the Five Kingdoms as a result of the events of Our Lady of Darkness.
- Fianamail - King of Laigin; succeeded Faelan, who had died of the Yellow Plague; first appeared in Suffer Little Children; hostile to Muman. Described as "a youth with foxy hair and an attitude to match it ... young and ambitious and determined to make a reputation for himself." (Our Lady of Darkness). Has been foiled twice by Fidelma: first, in the matter of the kingdom of Osraige (Suffer Little Children, for which he had to pay high fines to both the High King and King Colgu), then in the displacement in Laigin of the Law of the Fenechus by the Penitentials (Our Lady of Darkness, for which he was publicly admonished by the High King).
- Noe - Abbot of Fearna in Laigin; resigned as Abbot to become Fianamail's Spiritual Advisor; also hostile to Fidelma. First appeared in Suffer Little Children; related to the murdered Venerable Dacan. Left Fearna to go on a pilgrimage to Rome where he met Fainder, with whom he fell in love and brought back to Fearna to become its new Abbess. Became converted to the Penitentials; after the events of Our Lady of Darkness, left Fearna (and Ireland), possibly to follow Fainder back to Rome.

== Historical personages appearing in the series ==
- Colgú mac Faílbe Flaind
- Finguine mac Cathail
- Fiannamail mac Máele Tuile, King of Laigin
- Sechnassach, High King of Ireland. Murdered in Dancing with Demons
- Deusdedit of Canterbury. As Archbishop, dies of yellow fever in the first book Absolution by Murder
- Wighard, Archbishop-Elect of Canterbury. Murdered in Shroud for the Archbishop
- Oswy of Northumbria
- Hilda of Whitby
- Theodore of Tarsus, Archbishop of Canterbury (mentioned mostly, actually appears in the short story "The Lost Eagle")
- Leodegar, Bishop of Autun

== Themes ==
In the course of the series, Sister Fidelma journeys to many different parts of Western Europe, including Ireland, Wales, Northumbria, Hispania, Brittany, Francia and Rome. The differences between the societies she encounters and her native country is an ongoing theme throughout the series. Through Fidelma's adventures, Peter Tremayne introduces his readers to his views and interpretations of events and conflicts of 7th century Ireland. Major themes in the Sister Fidelma series include:

Inter-Societal Themes: Differences between Celtic society and other societies of the time

- The system of government, in particular the method of selecting a ruler. (the Celtic and early Anglo-Saxon system of election within elite kin-groups versus later systems of primogeniture.)
- Legal systems, conventions of legal proceedings (including methods of establishing innocence or guilt), and punishments for criminals.
- Political alliances, truces, and disputes between different countries.
- The legality of slavery.
- The role of women. (Relatively unrestricted in Celtic society; much more restricted in Roman and Anglo-Saxon societies.)

Intra-Societal Themes: Issues within Celtic society itself.

- Conflict between local (the five provinces of Ireland) and central (the High King at Tara) political authorities.
- Conflicts between different clans or regions of Ireland.
- Various aspects of Irish society, including language, geography, history, medicine, professions, customs, food, and hygiene.

Religious Themes

- The ongoing struggle between Celtic and Roman forms of Christianity for supremacy in the British Isles.
- The growing claims of Ard Macha (Armagh) to hold religious governance over all of the five kingdoms and their sub-kingdoms.
- The meeting of older pagan and newly introduced Christian forms of worship (sometimes this occurs easily in the Fidelma series, other times bitter conflicts result).
- The use of secular or traditional Irish law versus the Penitentials.
- The question of whether clergy should be celibate.
- The value of superstition and astrology.

== List of works ==
=== Novels ===
Title	Publication year	Events occur in
Absolution By Murder	1994	664 CE
Shroud for the Archbishop	1995	664 CE
Suffer Little Children	1995	665 CE
The Subtle Serpent	1996	666 CE
The Spider's Web	1997	666 CE
Valley of the Shadow	1998	666 CE
The Monk Who Vanished	1999	666 CE
Act of Mercy	1999	666 CE
Our Lady of Darkness	2000	666 CE
Smoke in the Wind	2001	666 CE
The Haunted Abbot	2002	666 CE
Badger's Moon	2003	667 CE
The Leper's Bell	2004	667 CE
Master of Souls	2005	668 CE
A Prayer for the Damned	2006	668 CE
Dancing with Demons	2007	669 CE
The Council of the Cursed	2008	670 CE
The Dove of Death	2009	670 CE
The Chalice of Blood	2010	670 CE
Behold A Pale Horse	2011	664 CE
The Seventh Trumpet	2012	670 CE
Atonement Of Blood	2013	670 CE
The Devil's Seal	2014	671 CE
The Second Death	2015	671 CE
Penance of the Damned	2016	671 CE
The Lair of the White Fox	2016	659 CE
Night of the Lightbringer	2017	671 CE
Bloodmoon	2018	671 CE
Blood in Eden	2019	672 CE
The Shapeshifter's Lair	2020	672 CE
The House of Death	2021	672 CE
Death of a Heretic	2022	672 CE
Revenge of the Stormbringer	2023	672 CE
Prophet of Blood	2024	672 CE
Grave of the Lawgiver	2025	673 CE
Blood on the Wind	2026	673 CE

=== Collections of short stories ===
- The International Sister Fidelma Society maintains a complete list of the Sister Fidelma short stories as well as their first U.S. and U.K. appearances.
- Hemlock At Vespers (ISBN 9780312252885) (2000)
- Whispers of the Dead (ISBN 9780755302291) (2004)
- An ensuing evil and others: fourteen historical mystery stories (ISBN 9780312342289) (2006). Includes stories not featuring Sister Fidelma.

=== Short fiction ===
1. "Hemlock At Vespers," Midwinter Mysteries 3, ed. Hilary Hale, Little Brown, London, October, 1993 US appearance: Murder Most Irish, ed. Ed Gorman, Larry Segriff & Martin H. Greenberg, Barnes Noble, 1996
2. "The High King's Sword," Mammoth Book of Historical Whodunnits, ed. Mike Ashley, foreword by Ellis Peters, Robinson Books, London, 1993 US: Carroll & Graf edition, New York
3. "Murder in Repose," Great Irish Detective Stories, ed. Peter Haining, Souvenir Press, London, 1993
4. "Murder By Miracle," Constable New Crime No 2, ed. Maxim Jakubowski, Constable, London, 1993 US appearance: The Year's Best Mystery & Suspense Stories 1994, ed. Edward D. Hoch, Walker & Co Ltd, New York
5. "A Canticle for Wulfstan," Midwinter Mysteries 4, ed. Hilary Hale, Little Brown, London, 1994 US appearance: Ellery Queen Mystery Magazine, May, 1995
6. "Abbey Sinister," Mammoth Book of Historical Detectives, ed. Mike Ashley, Robinson Publishing, London, 1995 US edition by Carroll & Graf New York
7. "Tarnished Halo," Minister Mysteries 5, ed. Hilary Hale, Little Brown, London, 1995
8. "The Horse That Died for Shame," Murder at the Races, ed, Peter Haining, Orion Books, London, 1995
9. "The Poison Chalice," Classical Whodunnits, ed. Mike Ashley, Robinson Books, London, 1996 US edition by Carroll & Graf, New York
10. "At the Tent of Holofernes," Ellery Queen Mystery Magazine, December, 1997
11. "A Scream from the Sepulchre," Ellery Queen Mystery Magazine, May, 1998
12. "Invitation to a Poisoning," Past Poisons: An Ellis Peters Memorial of Historical Crime, ed. Maxim Jakubowski, 1998
13. "Holy Blood," Great Irish Stories of Murder and Mystery, ed. Peter Haining, Souvenir Press, 1999
14. "Those Who Trespass," Chronicles of Crime - The Second Ellis Peters Memorial Anthology of Historical Crime, ed. Maxim Jakubowski, Headline, October, 1999
15. "Our Lady of Death," Dark Detectives: Adventures of the Supernatural Sleuths, ed. Steve Jones, Fedogan & Bremer, 2000
16. "Like A Dog Returning," Murder Most Medieval, ed. Martin H. Greenberg and John Heifers, Cumberland House, Nashville, Tennessee, USA, 2000
17. "Those Who Trespass" has not only been chosen for its popularity for reprinting in Murder Most Divine, ed. Ralph McInery and Martin H. Greenburg, Cumberland House, short, but for the prestigious collection World's Finest Crime and Mystery Stories, ed. Ed Gorman, Tor Books, New York, 2000
18. "Who Stole The Fish?," Murder Through The Ages, ed. Maxim Jakubowski, Headline Books, London, 2000
19. "Scattered Thorns," Murder Most Celtic, Martin H. Greenburg, Cumberland House, Nashville, Tennessee, USA, 2001
20. "Corpse on a Holy Day," And The Dying Is Easy, ed. Joseph Pittman and Annette Riffle, Signet, New York, April, 2001
21. "Death of an Icon", in a new Mike Ashley collection from Robinson, Fall, 2001
22. "The Astrologer Who Predicted His Own Murder," in Death By Horoscope, ed. Anne Perry, Carroll & Graf, New York, Fall, 2001.
23. "Death of an Icon," The Mammoth Book of Historical Whodunnits (Brand New Collection) ed. Mike Ashley, Robinson, London, August, 2001 (this is not to be confused with the collection under the same title published in 1993)
24. "Whispers of the Dead" has just been published in Murder Most Catholic, edited by Ralph McInerny, Cumberland House, Nashville, Tennessee, ISBN 1-58182-260-X, $14.95
25. "Gold At Night," Great Irish Drinking Stories, ed. Peter Haining, Souvenir Press, London, Fall, 2002
26. "The Blemish," The Brehon (Journal of the International Sister Fidelma Society), Little Rock, Arkansas, September issue (No.3), 2002
27. "The Lost Eagle," in The Mammoth Book of Roman Whodunnits, ed. Mike Ashley, Robinson, London, August, 2003. ISBN 1-84119-685-1. Also Carroll & Graf, New York, simultaneous publication, ISBN 0-7867-1241-4
28. "Dark Moon Rising," The Brehon (Journal of the International Sister Fidelma Society), Vol.II, No 3. September, 2003
29. "The Banshee," in Ellery Queen Mystery Magazine, New York, February, 2004
30. "Cry Wolf!" original story for Whispers of the Dead, St Martins Press (New York) and Headline (London) March 2004
31. "The Fosterer," original story for Whispers of the Dead, St Martins Press (New York) and Headline (London) March 2004
32. "The Heir Apparent," original story for Whispers of the Dead, St Martins Press (New York) and Headline (London) March 2004
33. "The Spiteful Shadow" in The Mammoth Book of Historical Whodunnits - Third Collection, edited by Mike Ashley, Robinson, London, June 2005 - as New Historical Whodunnits, Carroll & Graf, New York, June, 2005
  1. Reprinted in An Ensuing Evil and Others: Fourteen Historical Mystery Stories by Peter Tremayne, St Martin's Minotaur, New York, January, 2006. ISBN 0-312-34228-4
34. "Does God Obey his Own Laws?: A Sister Fidelma Mystery," in Thou Shalt Not Kill: Biblical Mystery Stories, edited by Anne Perry, Carroll & Graf, New York, December, 2005
35. "Sanctuary!," Ellery Queen Mystery Magazine, New York, May, 2006
36. "Finnbarr's Bell," The Holly Bough (Cork), Christmas, 2008
37. "The Night of the Snow Wolf," (novelette) in The Mammoth Book of Historical Mysteries, ed. Mike Ashley, Constable Robinson, London, July, 2011
38. "The Comb Bag," Ellery Queen Mystery Magazine, July, 2013
39. "The Lair of the White Fox" (e-novella) May 5, 2016 Headline Publishing
40. "Catspaw," Ellery Queen Mystery Magazine, December, 2016
41. "The Copyist," Ellery Queen Mystery Magazine, April 2017

== Graphic novel adaptations ==
- Absolution for Murder graphic novel, adapted by Antonio Muñoz with art by Josep Ferrer and Carlos Vila, available in Dutch (ISBN 9789034305534) and English (ISBN 9789086060436) versions from Uitgeverij Arboris.
- A Shroud for the Archbishop graphic novel, available in Dutch (ISBN 9789034306807) and English (ISBN 9789034408334) versions from Uitgeverij Arboris.
