= Faílbe Flann mac Áedo Duib =

King of Munster

- King of Munster
- Reign: c. 628 – 639
- Predecessor: Cathal mac Áedo
- Successor: Cúán mac Amalgado
- Died: 639
- Issue: Colgú mac Faílbe Flaind (died 678)

Faílbe Flann mac Áedo Duib (died 639) was a King of Munster from the Eóganacht Chaisil branch of the Eoganachta. He succeeded Cathal mac Áedo Flaind Chathrach of the Glendamnach branch in 628. He was the younger brother of a previous king Fíngen mac Áedo Duib (d. 618). His sobriquet Flann meant "blood-red".

== Career ==
In 629, he fought the Battle of Carn Feradaig (Cahernarry, County Limerick) versus Guaire Aidne mac Colmáin (d.663) of the Ui Fiachrach Aidhne of Connachta. Faílbe won the battle and Guaire was put to flight and his ally Conall mac Máele Dúib of the Uí Maine and many Connaught nobles were slain. Guaire ruled at the height of Ui Fiachrach power in south Connaught and sought to recover the lost Connaught territories in Thomond. Byrne believes that the true expansion of the Deisi into County Clare dates from this battle.

The other important event of his reign was the Battle of Áth Goan in the western Liffey plain fought in 636. In this battle Faílbe intervened in the Leinster kingship. He gave his support to Fáelán mac Colmáin (died 666) of the Uí Dúnlainge versus Crimthann mac Áedo of the Uí Máil who was king of Leinster. Failbe and Fáelán were allied with Conall Guthbinn mac Suibni (died 637) of Mide. They were victorious and Crimthann was slain. A Munster tract claims that Faílbe paid the tribute of the Laigin to the Ui Neill but Byrne dismisses this as later Munster propaganda to claim Leth Moga (the southern half of Ireland).

== Family and descendants ==
Faílbe's descendants were known as the Clann Faílbe sept of the Cashail branch, later known as the MacCarthy dynasty, rulers of the Kingdom of Desmond, as well as the principalities of Carbery, Muskerry, and Duhallow.

His son Colgú mac Faílbe Flaind (died 678) was also a King of Munster.

== See also ==
- Kings of Munster

Faílbe Flann mac Áedo Duib Eóganachta
Regnal titles
Preceded by Cathal mac Áedo	King of Munster c. 628 – 639	Succeeded by Cúán mac Amalgado
