= Rónán mac Colmáin =

Irish king

Rónán mac Colmáin was a King of Leinster following Brandub mac Echach (died 605). There were two men named Rónán mac Colmáin active in Leinster in the early seventh century and confusion exists as to which one was king. Some later sources confuse the two Rónáns, but historian Francis John Byrne notes that the earliest sources do not.

== Uí Cheinnselaig king ==
The first was Rónán mac Colmáin (died 624) He was King of the Uí Cheinnselaig and was the son of Colmán mac Cormaicc of the Sil Chormaic sept. The historian Francis John Byrne believes he was the one who was King of Leinster. His death is mentioned in both the Annals of Tigernach and the Annals of Ulster.

The later Leinster king Crundmáel Erbuilc mac Rónáin (died 656) was his son. Other sons were Blathmac (died 658) and Cummascach, a King of Uí Cheinnselaig. He was succeeded as king of Uí Cheinnselaig by Crundmáel Bolg Luatha mac Áedo (died 628).

== Uí Dúnlainge king ==
The second Rónán mac Colmáin (died 613) belonged to the Uí Dúnlainge and was the son of Colmán Már mac Coirpri.

The Annals of Tigernach includes his death obit with the title King of Laigin. These annals interpolated dates for some Leinster kings in this period from the king lists.

== Fingal Rónáin saga ==
Rónán mac Colmáin of the Uí Dúnlainge appears in the Fingal Rónáin (The Kinslaying of Rónán), also known as Aided Máele Fothartaig meic Rónáin (The Killing of Máel Fothartaig mac Rónáin), a Middle Irish-language verse tale of the 10th century. The story survives in the Book of Leinster. The protagonist of the tale is named Rónán mac Áedo, but genealogies have Rónán mac Colmáin as the father and killer of Máel Fothartaig. Professor Dan Wiley notes: "After Rónán's death, his line of the family became extinct. Subsequent Uí Dúnlainge kings of Leinster all trace descent from his brother Fáelán mac Colmáin."

According to the saga, Rónán's first wife was Eithne ingen Chummascaig by whom he had a son named Máelfothartaig. On Eithne's death he remarried to the daughter of Eochaid Iarlaithe (d. 666) of Dál nAraide. The new queen was very young and attempted to seduce her stepson. So Maelfothartaig went into voluntary exile in Scotland to avoid this. Eventually he returned home but the queen continued her advances which were refused and she tricked the king into having his son murdered.

== See also ==
- List of kings of Leinster
