= Cathal mac Néill =

Cathal mac Néill (died 729) or Cathal Cerr or Cathal Corc was a king of Southern Brega at Lagore. He belonged to the Uí Chernaig sept of the Síl nÁedo Sláine branch of the southern Uí Néill. He was the son of Niall mac Cernaig Sotal (died 701) and great-grandson of the high king Diarmait mac Áedo Sláine (died 665). He ruled the Uí Chernaig from 724-729 succeeding his brother the high king Fogartach mac Néill (died 724).

His father had been assassinated by the Uí Chonaing king of Brega, Írgalach mac Conaing (died 702) setting off a longstanding feud between these two septs of the Síl nÁedo Sláine. Cathal himself was killed in 729 but the circumstances are not given. Tha Annals of Tigernach give him the title ríg Desceirt Breagh, the first member of the sept to be so titled in the annals. The more primary source, The Annals of Ulster, do not give him this title however.

== See also ==
- Kings of Brega
