= Cúán mac Amalgado =

- King of Munster
- Reign: 631-641
- Predecessor: Faílbe Flann mac Áedo Duib
- Successor: Máenach mac Fíngin
- Died: 641; Munster
- House: Eóganachta
- Dynasty: Eóganacht Áine
- Father: Amalgaid mac Éndai

Cúán mac Amalgado (died 641) was a King of Munster from the Eóganacht Áine branch of the Eóganachta. He was the son of a previous king Amalgaid mac Éndai (d. 601). He succeeded Faílbe Flann mac Áedo Duib in 639.

No events are recorded in the annals for his reign but there is a mention of the slaying of a King of Munster named Cúán mac Éndai at the Battle of Carn Conaill as an ally of Guaire Aidne mac Colmáin (d. 663) of Connaught in his defeat by Diarmait mac Áedo Sláine of Brega. The battle took place in 649 which contradicts his death date and is dismissed by Prof. Byrne. However, Keating also mentions this event using his proper name and gives him a reign of 10 years.

He is known to have had a son named Máel Umai who was father of the Munster king Eterscél mac Máele Umai (d. 721).

== See also ==
- Kings of Munster

Cúán mac Amalgado Eóganachta
Regnal titles
Preceded by Faílbe Flann mac Áedo Duib	King of Cashel c. 639 – 641	Succeeded by Máenach mac Fíngin
