= Brandub mac Echach =

Brandub mac Echach (died 605) was an Irish king of the Uí Cheinnselaig of Leinster. His father, Echu mac Muiredaig had been a king of the Ui Cheinnselaig. They belonged to a branch known as the Uí Felmeda descended from Fedelmid, son of Énnae Cennsalach. His son Óengus, grandson Muiredach, and great-grandson Eochu were all kings of the Uí Cheinnselaig.

According to the Book of Leinster, Brandub succeeded Áed Cerr mac Colmáin Már (died 595) of the Uí Dúnlainge as king of Leinster (actually Áed Dibchine mac Senaig of the Uí Máil)

== Birth saga ==
In the Rawlinson B 502 manuscript, dated to c. 1130, is the poem Gein Branduib maic Echach ocus Aedáin maic Gabráin (The Birth of Brandub son of Eochu and of Aedán son of Gabrán). This tells how Áedán mac Gabráin of Dál Riata was Brandub's twin brother, exchanged at birth for one of the twin daughters of Gabrán, born the very same night, so that each family might have a son. Whether the tale is entirely fabricated, or whether it echoes a foster-relationship between Brandub and Áedán, can only be surmised. According to this story Brandub's father Echu had been expelled from the kingdom by Fáelán mac Síláin, his predecessor in the kingship of the Uí Chennselaig and had gone to live in Dál Riata at the court of Gabrán where Brandub and Aedán were fostered together. Later Echu returned to be king and brought his son with him. Afterwards, when Aedán and Brandub were both rulers, Aedán made a claim to the kingship of Ireland and invaded Leinster.

== Defence of Leinster ==
The first mention of Brandub in the annals is as victor in the Battle of Mag Ochtair (Cloncerry, N.Kildare) over the Ui Neill in 590. In 598 Brandub defeated the Uí Néill High King Áed mac Ainmuirech of the Cenél Conaill at the Battle of Dún Bolg (Dunboyke, Wicklow Co.) and the high king was slain, stopping the southward expansion of the Uí Néill. The Borúma Laigin (Cattle Tribute of Leinster) and the annals record that the war was caused by Brandub's killing of Áed's son Cummascach in 597 at Dún Buchat.

The Borúma Laigin gives much detail of this event. Brandub had the assistance of Saint Aedan of Ferns (d. 632) who tried to obtain a truce for Brandub with the high-king. Aedan then devised a strategy of having the forces of Brandub hide in food baskets to sneak into the enemy camp. Aedan was granted Ferns after his battle for the assistance he had given Brandub. The saga also relates that the Ulaid were allied to Leinster and that the king of Airgialla was slain fighting for the high king.

According to later poems in the Book of Leinster, which record his "seven blows against Brega" (later ruled by the Síl nÁedo Sláine), he may also have reconquered lands lost to the Uí Néill in the midlands of Ireland. This is also mentioned in the annals dated to 599. Later Uí Cheinnselaig kings, such as Diarmait mac Mail na mBo and his grandson Diarmait mac Murchada, although descended from a different line, associated Brandub's successes with their branch of the clan.

In 605 Brandub suffered a defeat at the Battle of Slaebre by the Ui Neill under the high king Áed Uaridnach of the Cenél nEógain. He was then assassinated by his own kinsman and son-in-law Sarán Saebderc.

== Descendants ==
The kindred of the Fir Thulach (in modern County Westmeath), subject to the Clann Cholmáin in later times, traced their ancestry from Brandub, as did the Uí Felmeda (of modern County Carlow).
