= Mór Muman (name) =

Mór Muman was a medieval Gaelic feminine given name.

== Notable people with the name ==
- Mór Muman (died 630s), Queen of Munster
- Mór Muman (died 742)
- Mór Muman Ní Briain (died 1218), Queen of Connacht
- Mór Muman Bean a' Burc (died 1421)
- Mhóire Muman (died 1527)
