= Colgú mac Faílbe Flaind =

Colgú mac Faílbe Flaind (died 678) was a King of Munster from the Eóganacht Chaisil branch of the Eoganachta. He was the son of Faílbe Flann mac Áedo Duib (d.639), a previous king. He succeeded Cathal Cú-cen-máthair mac Cathail as king in 665. The annals mention no details of his reign. His known son was named Nad Froích.

He is also a prominent character in the Sister Fidelma mystery series written by Peter Tremayne.

== See also ==
- Kings of Munster

Colgú mac Faílbe Flaind Eóganachta
Regnal titles
Preceded by Cathal Cú-cen-máthair	King of Cashel c. 665 – 678	Succeeded by Finguine mac Cathail
