= Crundmáel Erbuilc =

Crundmáel Erbuilc mac Rónáin (died 656) was a King of Leinster from the Uí Cheinnselaig branch of the Laigin. He was the son of Rónán mac Colmáin (died 625), a previous king of the Sil Chormaic sept.

His accession to the thrones of Leinster and to the throne of the Ui Cheinnselaig cannot be dated with certainty. The problem begins with the question of whether his father Ronan was king of Leinster or whether this king was Rónán mac Colmáin Már of the Uí Dúnlainge. His namesake Crundmáel Bolg Luatha mac Áedo was king of Uí Cheinnselaig when slain at the Battle of Duma Aichir in 628 by Fáelán mac Colmáin (died 666) of the Uí Dúnlainge who became king of Leinster in 634. Crundmáel Erbuilc became king of the Ui Chennselaig in 647 on the death of Colgu Bolg Luatha mac Crundmail.

The Book of Leinster gives Faelan a reign of 30 years and his death obit of 666 in the annals appears to be an interpolation based on the king lists. It is more probable that he died before 656 when Crundmáel Erbuilc mac Rónáin is called king of Leinster at his death obit. The Annals of Ulster refer to him as king of Leinster but the Annals of Tigernach call him king of south Leinster.

His son Áed Rón was ancestor of a branch which took over leadership of the Uí Dróna and his son Fiachra was ancestor of the later Leinster king Áed mac Colggen (died 738). By his wife Faílend ingen Suibne of the Déisi Muman he had a daughter Eithne who married Failbe mac Domnaill of the Uí Bairrche. He was succeeded as King of Uí Cheinnselaig by his brother Cummascach mac Rónáin.

== See also ==
- Kings of Leinster
