= Flann mac Áedo =

Flann mac Áedo (died 714) was a King of Fir Cúl in Brega of the Síl nDlúthaig sept of the Síl nÁedo Sláine of Brega. He was the son of Áed mac Dlúthaig (died 701), King of Fir Cúl and great-grandson of Ailill Cruitire mac Áedo Sláine (died 634), a king of Brega.

In his time a feud broke out among the Síl nÁedo Sláine between the Uí Chernaig sept of Lagore and the northern septs of Uí Chonaing of Cnogba (Knowth) and the Síl nDlúthaig of Fir Cúl. The Síl nDlúthaig also had a feud with the main Clann Cholmáin line of Uisnech in Mide. Flann's father Áed had killed Diarmait Dian mac Airmetaig Cáech, the King of Uisnech in 689.

In 711 the High King Fergal mac Máele Dúin (died 722) of the Cenél nEógain defeated and slew Flann's brother Cú Raí mac Áedo at the Battle of Sliab Fúait (in the Fews, Co.Armagh) along with the king of Uí Méith.

In 712 the feud among the Síl nÁedo Sláine was intensified when Flann defeated and slew Maine mac Néill of Uí Chernaig. In 714 Flann fought the Battle of Bile Tened (near Moynalty with the Clann Cholmáin led by Murchad Midi (died 715). In the first encounter two brothers of Murchad were slain, but, in the second encounter, Flann himself was slain.

His brother Gormgal mac Áedo was slain in the Battle of Cenannas (near Kells) fighting for Amalgaid mac Congalaig (died 718) of Uí Chonaing versus Conall Grant of the Uí Chernaig. His son Dúngal mac Flainn (died 747) was King of Fir Cúl .
