= Áed Bennán mac Crimthainn =

Áed Bennán mac Crimthainn (died 618) was a possible King of Munster from the Eóganacht Locha Léin branch of the Eoganachta. He was definitely king of West Munster or Iarmuman. He was the great-grandson of Dauí Iarlaithe mac Maithni also a possible king of Munster from this branch His byname bennán means "horned," so it may refer to a spiked or horned helmet that he wore. (The association of horns with cuckoldry did not exist until centuries later.)

There is some dispute in the sources as to his reign and that of Fíngen mac Áedo Duib (d. 618) of the Chaisil branch. The Annals of Tigernach call him King of Munster and place him before Fingin. The Annals of Ulster and Annals of Innisfallen do not give him a title at his death obit. In the Annals of The Four Masters he is only king of Iarmuman.

In his death obit in the Annals of The Four Masters this is said of him

"Aedh Beannan, of Eoghanacht Iar-Luachair,—
Woe to the wealth of which he was king!
Happy the land of which he was guardian.
His shield when he would shake,
his foes would be subdued;
Though it were but on his back,
it was shelter to West Munster"

According to the saga Mór of Munster and the Violent Death of Cuanu mac Ailchine his daughter Mór Muman (d. 636) was married to Fingen and later married his successor Cathal mac Áedo (d. 627), thereby transferring the kingship to him. Another daughter Ruithchern was the cause of a war between the Loch Lein and Glendamnach branches in the next generation. This war may reflect the extent of these branches' power at this time as compared to the Corco Loigde, Corco Duibne, and Ciarraige of Iarmuman; other subject tribes mentioned were the Corco Mruad and Corco Baiscinn of Thomond.

His known sons were Máel Dúin mac Áedo Bennán (d. 661) and Cummíne.

== See also ==
- Kings of Munster
