= Finguine mac Cathail =

Finguine mac Cathail Con-cen-máthair (died 696) was a King of Munster from the Glendamnach branch of the Eoganachta. He was the son of Cathal Cú-cen-máthair mac Cathaíl. He succeeded Colgú mac Faílbe Flaind in 678.

During his reign the law text Cáin Fuithirbe was enacted at Mag Fuithirbe on the borders of Cork and Kerry in 683. Representatives of the major tribes of Munster are mentioned in the tract.

Finguine's known son was Cathal mac Finguine a powerful King of Munster.

He is a recurring character in Peter Tremayne's Sister Fidelma mysteries.

== See also ==
- Kings of Munster

Finguine mac Cathail Eóganachta
Regnal titles
| Preceded by Colgú mac Faílbe Flaind | King of Cashel c. 678 – 696 | Succeeded by Ailill mac Cathail and Eterscél mac Máele Umai |
