= Loingsech mac Óengusso =

High King of Ireland (died 703)

Loingsech mac Óengusso (died 703) was an Irish king who was High King of Ireland. Loingsech was a member of the northern Cenél Conaill branch of the Uí Néill. Although his father Óengus (died 650) had not been High King, his grandfather Domnall mac Áedo (died 642) had been.

== Early events ==
Loingsech is first mentioned in the annals of Ireland under the year 672 when he defeated Dúngal mac Máele Tuil of the Cenél mBógaine who was slain. The Cenél mBógaine were a branch of the Cenél Conaill located in southwest County Donegal. The Annals of Ulster do not mention Loingsech as victor, whereas the Annals of Tigernach do. The Annals of the Four Masters refer to Loingsech as chief of the Cenél Conaill with regards to this event. His accession to lordship of the Cenél Conaill is not mentioned, but the death of his uncle Ailill Flann Esa (died 666) is recorded during the plague years.

== High Kingship ==
The Chronicle of Ireland records the beginning of Loingsech's reign in 696, having recorded the killing of his predecessor Fínsnechta Fledach the year previously. The record in the Annals of Ulster may show that Congalach mac Conaing Cuirre (died 696) of the Síl nÁedo Sláine branch of the southern Uí Néill was a candidate for the high kingship after the killing of Fínsnechta, in competition with Loingsech. It is not until after Congalach's death that the annal, probably based on a contemporaneous chronicle kept on Iona, announces the beginning of Loingsech's reign. The Annals of Tigernach on the other hand place the beginning of Loingsech's reign in 695 before the death of Congalach. He ruled as high king from 695–703.

It was in his reign that Adomnán – a member of the Cenél Conaill – came to preach in Ireland. Loingsech appears as the first non-ecclesiastical signatory of Adomnán's "law of the innocents"—the Cáin Adomnáin—agreed at the Synod of Birr in 697. Loingsech gave his full support to this law and it is likely through his aid that the Law found widespread support.

The annals record plagues afflicting people and cattle, and famine following, during his reign. According to Keating this famine went on for three years.

== Death and descendants ==
The Cenél Conaill expansion in the north had been blocked by the expansion of the rival Cenél nEógain into Daire. As a result, their outlet for expansion was to the south versus Connacht. This, along with a desire to make his high kingship a reality, prompted an attack on Connacht in 703. Loingsech was killed in 703, in the Battle of Corann (in Southern Co.Sligo) against the men of Connacht led by their old king Cellach mac Rogallaig (died 705). The Chronicle of Ireland again calls him High King when reporting his death. The annals say that three of Loingsech's sons (Artgal, Connachtach, and Flann Gerg) were killed with him, and many others besides.

A quatrain attributed to the old king Cellach states:

"For his deeds of ambition, on the morning he was slain at Glais Chuilg; I slew Loingseach there with a sword, the monarch of all Ireland round."

He married Muirenn ingen Cellaig (died 748), daughter of Cellach Cualann (died 715), King of Leinster. Their son, Flaithbertach (died 765), was later High King. Another son, Fergal, led a force of northern Ui Neill in victory over Connacht to avenge his father's death in 707.

Loingsech was followed as High King of Ireland by Congal Cennmagair (died 710).
