= Cathal mac Áedo =

Cathal mac Áedo Flaind Chathrach (died 627) was a King of Cashel in Munster from the Glendamnach sept of the Eoganachta. He was the son of Áed Fland Cathrach and grandson of Coirpre Cromm mac Crimthainn (died 577) a previous king of Cashel. He succeeded to the throne on the death of Fíngen mac Áedo Duib in 618.

According to an old saga poem Mór of Munster and the Violent Death of Cuanu mac Ailchine, he married the widow of his predecessor Mór Muman (died 636) who was the daughter of Áed Bennán mac Crimthainn (died 618) of the Loch Lein Eoganachta of West Munster thereby assuring his right to rule at Cashel. After rescuing her sister Ruithchern from the Uí Liatháin who had captured her, the two sisters proceeded to lament the dead king Fíngen mac Áedo Duib and the prosperity of his time for which they were rebuked by Cathal.

Mór marries Ruithcern to Lonán mac Findig who is a close ally of Cathal's, probably of the Éile. However one day the king bids him rise and show respect to the king of the Déisi. Lonán takes offence at this request and leaves Cashel taking his wife with him planning to stay with his wife's family, the sons of Áed Bennán, but en route, he is attacked and wounded by Cuanu mac Ailchine of the Fir Maige Féne who abducts Ruithchern. This leads to a war between the sons of Áed Bennán and the sons of Cathal. The warfare led to attacks by both septs on the subject peoples of each other, while avoiding direct confrontation with each other.

The events of this saga in terms of the feud between the Glendamnach and Loch Lein branches are reflected in some references in the annals to events in the next generation. In 644 was fought the battle of Cenn Con in Munster between Máel Dúin mac Áedo Bennán (died 661), and Aengus Liath (died 644) of Glendamnach (the brother of Cathal) with much slaughter on both sides and Máel Dúin was put to flight. The death of Cuanu mac Cailchín is mentioned in 644.

Cathal had seven sons including Cathal Cú-cen-máthair mac Cathaíl (died 665) a king of Cashel.

== See also ==
- Kings of Munster

Cathal mac Áedo Eóganachta
Regnal titles
| Preceded by Fíngen mac Áedo Duib and Áed Bennán mac Crimthainn | King of Cashel c. 618 – 627 | Succeeded by Faílbe Flann mac Áedo Duib |
