= Cathal Cú-cen-máthair =

King of Munster

Cathal Cú-cen-máthair mac Cathaíl (died 665), often known as Cú-cen-máthair, was an Irish King of Munster from around 661 until his death. He was a son of Cathal mac Áedo Flaind Chathrach (died c. 628) and belonged to the Glendamnach sept of the Eóganachta dynasty. The name Cú-cen-máthair means the "motherless hound".

Cú-cen-máthair succeeded Máenach mac Fíngin of the Eóganacht Chaisil, the Cashel branch of the kindred. A surviving poem attributed to Luccrech moccu Chérai contains a list of his ancestors back to Adam.

Cú-cen-máthair died in 665 of a plague which killed many others as recorded in the Irish annals. The king lists have him followed as King of Munster by Colgú mac Faílbe Flaind of the Eóganacht Chaisil. Cú-cen-máthair left at least two sons, Finguine mac Cathail (died 696) and Ailill mac Cathail (died 701), both of whom are listed as Kings of Munster in the annals.

Cathal Cú-cen-máthair Eóganachta
Regnal titles
| Preceded by Máenach mac Fíngin | King of Cashel c. 661 – 665 | Succeeded by Colgú mac Faílbe Flaind |
