= Crundmáel Bolg Luatha =

Crundmáel Bolg Luatha mac Áedo (died 628) was a King of Uí Cheinnselaig. He was the grandson of a previous king Éogan Cáech and great-great-grandson of the Leinster king Crimthann mac Énnai (died 483). He ruled from 625 to 630 and succeeded Rónán mac Colmáin of the Sil Chormaic sept as King of Ui Cheinnselaig.

The annals record that he was besieged in 626 by the Ui Neill and the Annals of Ulster call this the "sack of ashes". He was slain at the Battle of Duma Aichir in 628 by Fáelán mac Colmáin (died 666) from the Uí Dúnlainge, later King of Leinster.

He was succeeded by his son Colgu Bolg Luatha who was slain in 647.
