= Fíngen mac Áedo Duib =

Fíngen mac Áedo Duib (Modern Irish: Finghin mac Aodha Dhuibh, pronounced [ˈfʲɪnʲiːnʲ mˠək ˈiːə ɣɪvʲ]) (died 618) was a King of Munster from the Eóganacht Chaisil branch of the Eoganachta. He was the great-grandson of Feidlimid mac Óengusa, a previous king. He succeeded Amalgaid mac Éndai as king in 601.

There is some dispute in the sources as to his reign and that of Áed Bennán mac Crimthainn (died 618) of the Loch Lein branch. The Annals of Tigernach give the title King of Munster to both of them but give Fíngen's accession after Amalgaid in 601. The Annals of Innisfallen do not give Aed this title but give it to Fingin.

His reign was a prosperous one:

Munster in the time of Fíngen mac Áedo, its store-houses were full, its homesteads were fruitful.

According to the saga Mór of Munster and the Violent Death of Cuanu mac Ailchine he was originally married to a Deisi woman but later married Mór Muman (died 636), the daughter of Áed Bennán. Mór Muman was purported to be the most beautiful and desirable woman in all of Ireland at the time. She later married his successor Cathal mac Áedo (died 627) thereby transferring the kingship to him.

He was very attentive and attractive to women as evidenced by this passage in the Psalter of Cashel:

Fíngen, the fierce, the active

Reckless, intrepid to the last

Kind and gentle towards women,

Alas! in bonds of love held fast.

His sons by Mór were Sechnussach and Máenach mac Fíngin (died 661) who was a King of Munster. A distant descendant was Feidlimid mac Cremthanin (died 847).

The direct descendants of Fíngen mac Áedo Duib were known as the Cenél Fíngin, are the O'Sullivans and MacGillycuddys. The MacGillycuddys are ultimately a sept of the O'Sullivans.

Fíngen mac Áedo Duib Eóganachta
Regnal titles
Preceded by Amalgaid mac Éndai and Garbán mac Éndai	King of Cashel c. 601 – 618	Succeeded by Cathal mac Áedo

== See also ==
- Kings of Munster
