= Fáelán mac Colmáin =

Fáelán mac Colmáin (died 666) was a King of Leinster from the Uí Dúnlainge branch of the Laigin. He was the son of Colmán Már mac Coirpri, a previous king. Faelan was the founder of the true fortunes of the Ui Dunlainge dynasty.

== Rise to the throne ==
Faelan is first mentioned in the annals when he defeated and slew Crundmáel Bolg Luatha of the Uí Cheinnselaig at the Battle of Duma Aichir in 628. The annals seem to give him the title of king of Leinster by anticipation. Then in alliance with Faílbe Flann mac Áedo Duib (died 637), the king of Munster and Conall Guthbinn mac Suibni (died 635) of the Clann Cholmáin he defeated and slew Crimthann mac Áedo (died 633), the Uí Máil king of Leinster, at the Battle of Áth Goan in western Liffey. From this date he becomes king of Leinster. The Book of Leinster gives him a reign of 30 years and his death obit of 666 in the annals appears to be an interpolation based on the king lists. It is more probable that he died before 656 when Crundmáel Erbuilc mac Rónáin is called king of Leinster at his death obit.

== Church relations ==
The traditions of Saint Kevin of Glendalough assert that Faelan was fostered by Kevin when rejected by his stepmother. Ui Dunlainge patronage of Glendalough kept this tradition alive. Faelans brother Áed Dub was abbot and bishop of Kildare and his nephew Óengus mac Áedo Find was also bishop of Kildare. The possession of Kildare by family members was important to his hold on power. One of his wives was Sárnat ingen Echach of the Fotharta Fea, a tribe with connections to Saint Brigid of Kildare.

== Relations with the Uí Néill ==
The rise of the Ui Dunlainge to power appears to have been assisted by the Clann Cholmain who were looking to neutralize the border situation with the Ui Failgi so as to carry out their rivalry with the Síl nÁedo Sláine. One of his wives was Uasal ingen Suibni (died 643), sister of Conall mac Suibni who had assisted him at Ath Goan.

The Irish saga Bóroma ("The Cattle Tribute") claims that the high king Sechnassach mac Blathmaic(died 671) of the Síl nÁedo Sláine led a large army to claim the cattle tribute from Laigin but was defeated by Faelan mac Colmain but this doesn't fit chronologically with Faelan's reign.

== Family ==
His son by Sarnat was Conall mac Fáelán, who was father, by Conandil ingen Crundmáel of the Ui Dunlainge, of Bran Mut mac Conaill (died 693), a king of Leinster.

== See also ==
- Kings of Leinster
