= Áed Dibchine =

King of Leinster

Áed Dibchine mac Senaig (died 595) was a King of Leinster from the Uí Máil branch of the Laigin. He is the first king of this branch to hold the overlordship of Leinster.

The Book of Leinster king lists mention a certain Áed Cerr mac Colmáin who appears as genealogically related to the Uí Dúnlainge and is made to appear this way as the son of Colmán Már mac Coirpre. However, it is Aed Dibchine who was the king at this time. The king lists of the Book of Leinster appear falsified for the 6th century to give greater claim to the Ui Dunlainge which prevents a clear picture of this era in Leinster

His sons were Rónán Crach, possibly the Leinster king mentioned in the saga "Fingal Rónáin" (The Kinslaying of Rónán); and Crimthann mac Áedo (died 633), a king of Leinster.

== See also ==
- Kings of Leinster
