= Synod of Birr =

The Synod of Birr, held at Birr in modern County Offaly, Ireland in 697 was a meeting of churchmen and secular notables. Best remembered as the occasion on which the Cáin Adomnáin—the Law of Innocents—was guaranteed, the survival of a list of the guarantors of the law sheds some light on the synod.

The meeting at Birr is thought to have been convoked by Adomnán, Abbot of Iona, and his kinsman, the High King of Ireland, Loingsech mac Óengusso. As well as being the site of a significant monastery, associated with Saint Brendan of Birr, Birr was close to the boundary between the Uí Néill-dominated Leth Cuinn, the northern half of Ireland, and the southern half, Leth Moga, where the Eóganachta kings of Munster ruled. In 827 it served as the site of a rígdal, a meeting of kings, between the Uí Néill High King Conchobar mac Donnchada and the powerful Eóganachta king Fedlimid mac Crimthainn. It therefore represented a form of neutral ground where the rival kings and clerics of north and south Ireland could meet without loss of face. Birr lay in the territory of the Éile.

Among the churchmen present, or sending representatives, were Flann Febla, bishop of Armagh and spiritual heir of Saint Patrick, the abbot of Emly, chief religious site of the Eóganachta, other bishops and abbots, learned men such as Muirchu moccu Machtheni, author of a life of Saint Patrick, and, from Britain the Pictish bishop Curetán, and Adomnán and bishop Coeddi, both from Iona.
