= Cáin Adomnáin =

697 prohibition against war crimes in Ireland

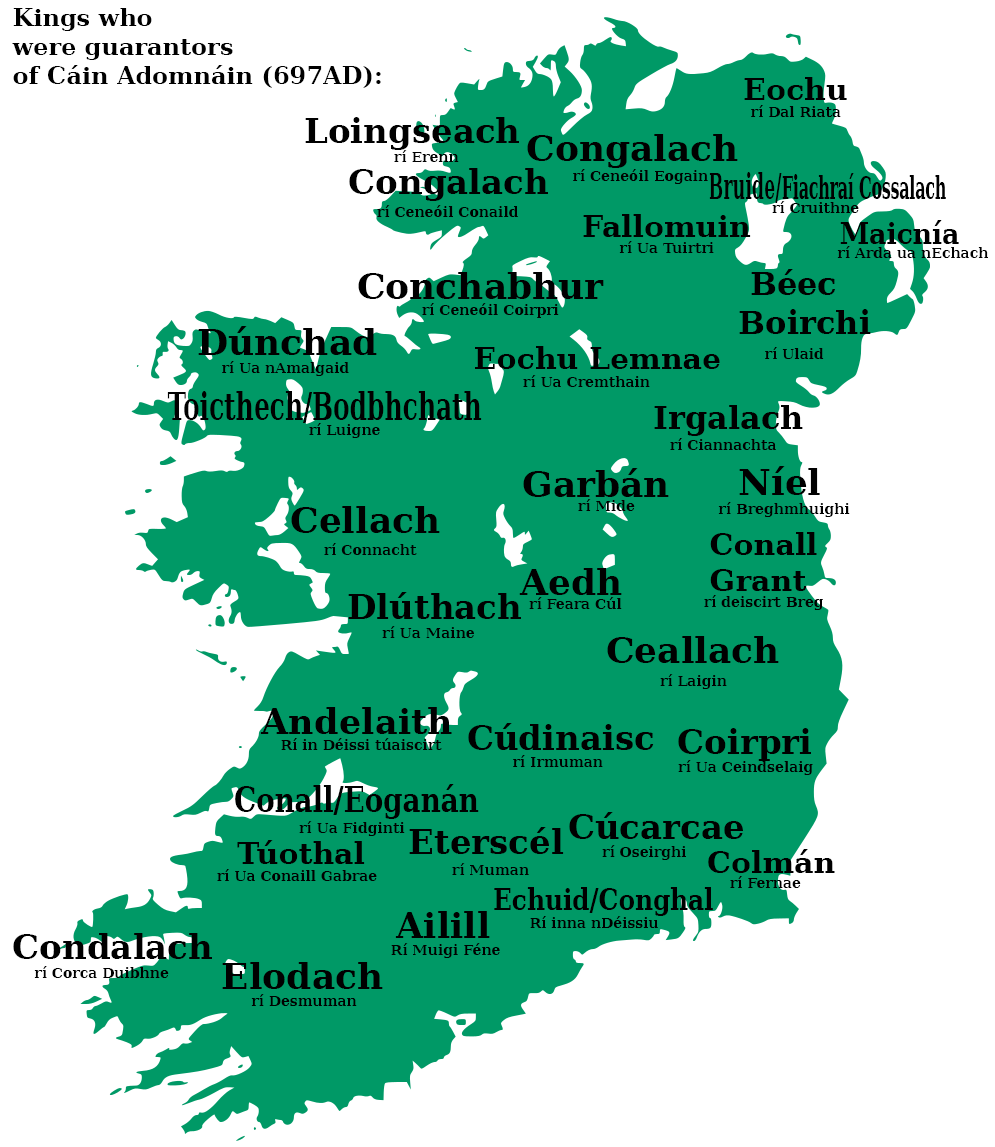
Overkings who guaranteed the Cáin Adomnáin.

The Cáin Adomnáin (Old Irish pronunciation: [ˈkaːnʲ ˈaðəβ̃ˌnaːnʲ], KAHN AH-thuv-nahn, "Law of Adomnán"), also known as the Lex Innocentium (Law of Innocents), was promulgated amongst a gathering of Gaelic and Pictish notables at the Synod of Birr in 697. It is named after its initiator Adomnán of Iona, ninth Abbot of Iona after St. Columba. It is called the "Geneva Accords" of the ancient Irish and Europe's first human rights treaty, for its protection of women and non-combatants, extending the Law of Patrick, which protected monks, to civilians. The legal symposium at the Synod of Birr was prompted when Adomnáin had an Aisling dream vision wherein his mother excoriated him for not protecting the women and children of Ireland.

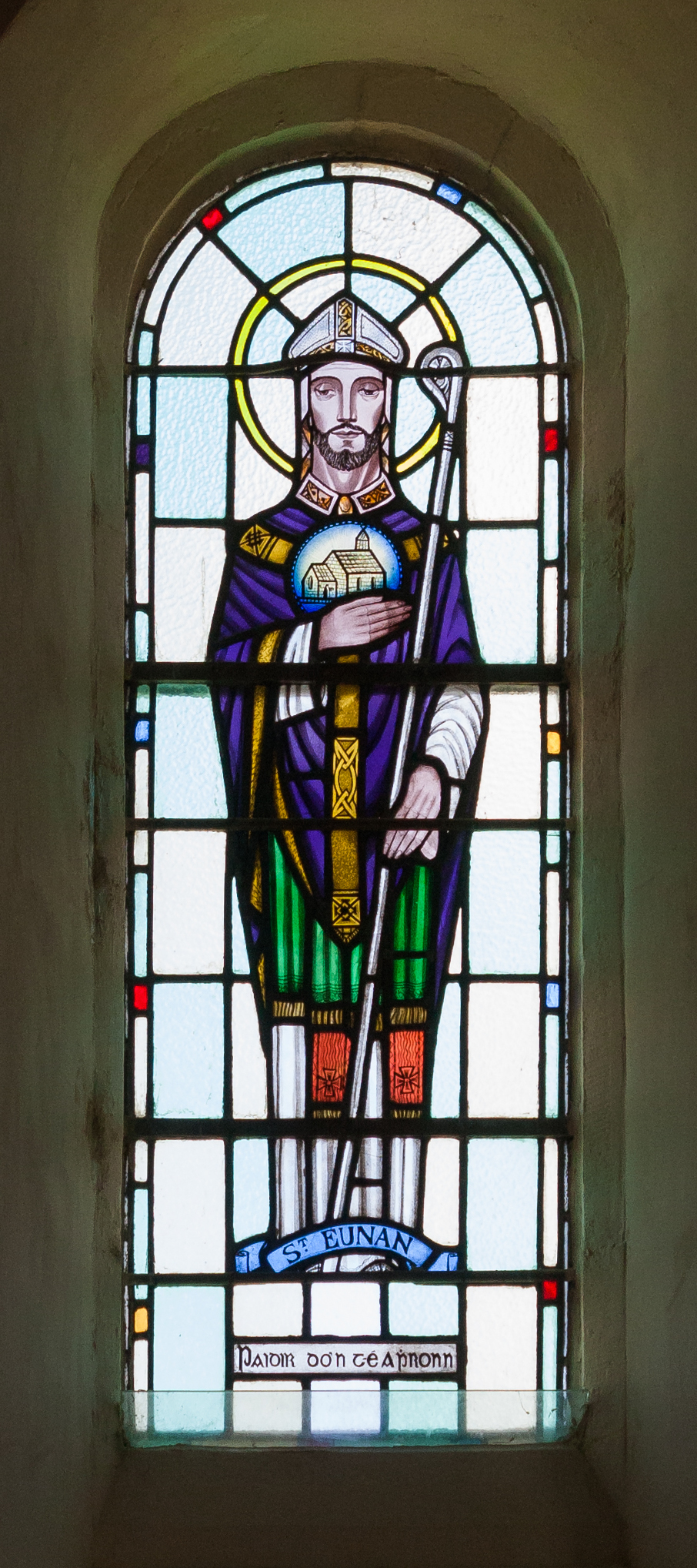
St Adomnán depicted on stained glass in Dunlewey church.

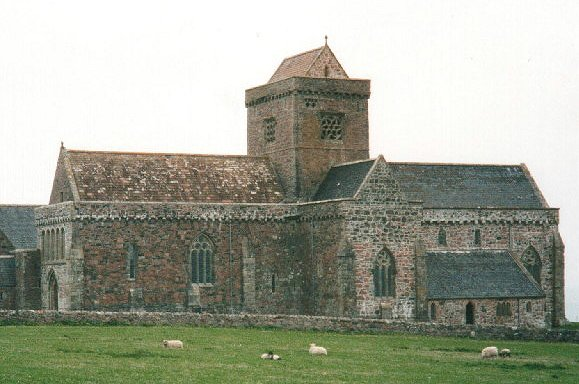
Iona Abbey where Cáin Adomnáin, the Irish 'Geneva Convention', may have been written

== History ==
During almost two centuries, and more precisely the years AD 697–887, nine different ordinances were promulgated and kept in the record of the annals of Ireland. Each ordinance was issued either by a saint or monastic group. Three texts of these legislations have come to us, the earliest being Cáin Adomnáin - Lex Innocentium - proclaimed by Adomnán, abbot of Iona, at the synod of Birr in 697.

According to D.N. Dumville, it is suspected that the promulgation of this law in 697 was a centennial commemoration of Columba, who died in 597. The Cáin Adomnáin includes a guarantor-list featuring 91 political and ecclesiastical figures from Ireland, Dál Riata, and Pictland, which has been shown to be near contemporaneous to the promulgation of the Law in 697. As a successor of Columba of Iona, Adomnán had sufficient prestige to assemble this group of chieftains and clerics. The list of secular rulers is headed by Loingsech mac Óengusso, who was the Cenél Conaill King of Tara. Adomnán was related to this king, and it has been suggested that an alliance with Uí Néill royal power helped ensure widespread support for the Law. As well as being the site of a significant monastery, associated with Saint Brendan of Birr, Birr was close to the boundary between the Uí Néill-dominated northern half of Ireland, and the southern half, where the kings of Munster ruled. It, therefore, represented a form of neutral ground where the rival kings and clerics of both sides of Ireland could meet.

Various factors, including Marian devotion in seventh- and eighth-century Ireland, are supposed to have contributed to inspire Adomnán to introduce these laws, but it may also be that as Columba's biographer, he was prompted by the saint's example. It was originally known as the Law of the Innocents and focused on the beneficiary noncombatants. Upon its renewal in 727, it referenced its author.

== Content ==
The indigenous Brehon Laws were committed to parchment about the 7th century, most likely by clerics. Most scholars now believe that the secular laws were not compiled independently of monasteries. Adomnan would have had access to the best legal minds of his generation.

The Cáin Adomnáin was designed, among other things, to guarantee the safety and immunity of various types of noncombatants in warfare. It required, for example, that "whoever slays a woman... his right hand and his left foot shall be cut off before death, and then he shall die."

If a woman committed murder, arson, or theft from a church, she was to be set adrift in a boat with one paddle and a container of gruel. This left the judgment up to God and avoided violating the proscription against killing a woman.

The laws also provided sanctions against many things like the killing of children, clerics and clerical students. Clerical lands were also protected. This covered non-combatants in times of war, who previously only received protection up to the age of seven under Irish law.

The law described both the secular fines which criminals must pay and the ritual curses to which lawbreakers were subject. Bystanders who did nothing to prevent the crime were as liable as the perpetrator. "Stewards of the Law" collected the fine and paid it to the victim or next of kin.

At the same time, the Cáin Adomnáin differed from the indigenous Irish legal tradition in that it imposed the death penalty at all (including something like a de facto death penalty for women as mentioned above), whereas Irish tradition generally imposed only fines even for the most serious offences such as murder (regardless of the sex of the perpetrator).

== Legacy ==
According to the Irish Annals, in 727 the relics of Adomnán were brought to Ireland for the renewal of the Law. and these relics returned to Iona in 730. Adomnán's initiative appears to be one of the first systematic attempts to lessen the savagery of warfare among Christians, a remarkable achievement for a churchman on the remote outer edge of Europe. In it, he gave local expression, in the context of the Gaelic legal tradition, to a wider Christian movement to restrain violence.

It was an early example of international law in that it was to be enforced in Ériu and Albu, (Ireland and Britain) although Britain refers to only what is now northern Scotland for it was the kings of that region who were guarantors of the Law.

As with later clerical efforts, such as the Peace and Truce of God movement in millennial France, the law may have been of limited effectiveness. Fergus Kelly notes that no cases relating to the Cáin Adomnáin have been preserved. Thus, it is unknown whether the harsh penalties which it mandates, which may have contradicted the general character of Irish law, were rigidly enforced.

There are annalistic examples of the justice of the Cáin Adomnáin being applied, such as here by Cenél nEógain High King Niall Glúndub, for whom the O'Neill Clan of Ulster are named.

- In 907 the sanctuary of Ard Macha was violated by Cearnachan mac Duilgen who took a captive from the church and drowned him in Lough Cier nearby.
- This perpetrator was taken by Nial Glundub mac Aedha, Righ an Tuaisceirt, having replaced his brother Domnall as king of the north, and he drowned Cearnachan in the same lake Lough Cier in revenge for the violation of Padraicc.
