= Uí Máil =

Uí Máil were an Irish dynasty of Leinster. They were descended from Maine Mál, the brother of the legendary high king Cathair Mór. The Uí Máil were a dominant dynasty in Leinster competing for the kingship in the 7th century before being eventually ousted by the Uí Dunlainge and retreating east from the River Liffey plain in the 8th century. They are then found along the western foothills of the Wicklow Mountains. The Glen of Imaal, named for them, appears to have been a center of their power.

Kings of Leinster from the Ui Mail included:

- Áed Dibchine mac Senaig d. 593
- Crimthann mac Áedo, d. 636
- Fiannamail mac Máele Tuile, d. 680
- Cellach Cualann mac Gerthide, d. 715

Fiannamail was ancestor to the Uí Théig (O'Tighe) north of Uí Máil territory just west of the Wicklow mountains, while Cellach Cualann was ancestor to the Uí Ceallaig Cualann (O'Kelly) on the Dublin-Wicklow border in the foothills of the Wicklow mountains. Cuala or Cualu was the old name of a region around the foot-hills of southern Dublin.

== See also ==
- Kings of Leinster
- Kelly the Boy from Killanne
