= Donough =

Donough family crest

The Irish surname Donough originally appeared in Gaelic as Mac Donough, which means son of Donnchadh or son of Donagh, a personal name composed of the elements donn meaning ‘brown-haired’ or "dark" from Donn a Gaelic God; and chadh, meaning "chief" or "noble".

Spelling variations of this family name include: Donoghue, Donaghoe, Donaho, Donahoe, Donough, Donahue, Donahow, Doneghoe, Donehue, Donighue, Donohoe, Donahugh, Donohough, Donohow, Donohue, Donaughue, O'Donoghue, Dunphy, Donaghie, Donaghy and many more.

First found in County Kerry, where they held a family seat from very ancient times.
