= O'Donoghue =

Surname

Donoghue or O'Donoghue is an anglicised form of the Irish language surname Ó Donnchadha or Ó Donnchú.

== Etymology ==
The name means "descendant of Donnchadh", a personal name composed of the elements donn "brown-haired [man]" and cath "battle". Spelling variations (which include an initial "Ó" or omit it) include Donoghue, Donaghue, Donaghoe, Donoughe, Donaho, Donahoe, Donough, Donahue, Donahow, Doneghoe, Donehue, Donighue, Donihue, Donoho, Donohoe, Donahugh, Donohough, Donohow, Donohue, Donaughue, Donaghie, Donaghy, Doughue, Dougue, Donihoo, Dunahoo and many more. Some of these variations exist also in Northern Ireland and Scotland with the same meaning in Scottish Gaelic as in Irish.

== Septs in Ireland ==
There are several completely different O'Donoghue families in Ireland.

- (1) The Ó Donnchadha of Cashel, from the Eóganacht Chaisil, related to the O'Sullivans, MacCarthys and O'Callaghans. They descend from Donnchad mac Cellacháin, King of Munster.
- (2) The Ó Donnchadha of Desmond, from the Eóganacht Raithlind, related to the O'Mahonys, prominent in County Kerry and referred to as "O'Donoghue Mór." They descend from Donnchadh mac Domhnall.
- (3) The Ó Donnchadha of Osraige, from the Clann Conla, related to the Mac Giolla Phádraig dynasty ("the Fitzpatricks") and produced some kings of Osraige, prominent in County Kilkenny and commonly anglicised as Dunphy. They descend from Donnchad mac Gilla Pátraic.
- (4) The Ó Donnchadha of Uí Maine, from the Uí Maine, related to the O'Kellys, prominent in County Galway and County Roscommon.

== People with the surname O'Donoghue ==
=== Arts, media, and entertainment ===
- Ben O'Donoghue, Australian celebrity chef
- Bernard O'Donoghue, Irish poet and academic
- Colin O'Donoghue, Irish actor
- Danny O'Donoghue, lead singer of the Irish band "The Script"
- David James O'Donoghue, journalist and author
- Gary O'Donoghue, BBC journalist
- Michael O'Donoghue, Irish-American comedian, writer and occasional performer for Saturday Night Live
- Tighe O'DonoghueRoss, Irish-American painter, printmaker, and sculptor

=== Sport ===
- Brian O'Donoghue, former GAA goalkeeper
- Ed O'Donoghue, Irish rugby union player
- John E. O'Donoghue, Major League Baseball pitcher
- John P. O'Donoghue, Major League Baseball pitcher
- Neil O'Donoghue, former NFL kicker
- Peter O'Donoghue (athlete) (born 1971), New Zealand distance runner

=== Politicians and activists ===
- Daniel O'Donoghue, Irish politician
- Daniel John O'Donoghue, Ontario labour leader and political figure
- John O'Donoghue (politician), Irish Fianna Fáil politician, former cabinet minister and former Ceann Comhairle
- Juan O'Donojú, Spanish military officer and last viceroy of New Spain
- Kevin O'Donoghue, the first Chief of Defence Materiel in the United Kingdom Ministry of Defence
- Lowitja O'Donoghue, Aboriginal Australian nurse, public servant, and Indigenous rights advocate
- Martin O'Donoghue, Irish economist and Fianna Fáil politician
- Nan Joyce née O'Donoghue, Irish Travellers' right activist

=== Other people ===
- Charles Henry O'Donoghue, zoologist
- Florence O'Donoghue, Irish historian and intelligence specialist
- Geoffrey Paul Vincent O'Donoghue of the Glens
- Kevin O'Donoghue, artist educator] at Clonkeen College
- Patrick O'Donoghue, Irish-born current bishop emeritus of the Roman Catholic Diocese of Lancaster, England
- Peter O'Donoghue (officer of arms) (born 1971), British genealogist

== See also ==
- O'Donoghue of the Glens
- Clan Robertson, a Scottish clan anciently known as Clann Dhonnchaidh
- Donahoe
- Donoghue (disambiguation)
- Donohue
- Donohoe
- Donahue
- Donough
- Irish nobility
- O'Donohue
- Ross Castle

=== Other Munster families ===
- O'Mahony
- O'Donovan
- McGillycuddy of the Reeks and/or O'Sullivan Mor
- O'Callaghan
- O'Brien, Prince of Thomond
- O'Grady of Kilballyowen
