= Donnchadh =

Donnchadh (Scottish Gaelic pronunciation: [ˈt̪ɔn̪ˠɔ.xəɣ]) is a masculine given name common to the Irish and Scottish Gaelic languages. It is composed of the elements donn, meaning "brown" or "dark" from Donn a Gaelic God; and chadh, meaning "chief" or "noble". The name is also written as Donnchad, Donncha, Donnacha, Donnchadha and Dúnchad. Modern versions include (in Ireland) Donnacha, Donagh, Donough, Donogh and (in Scotland) Duncan.

The Irish surnames Donough, McDonagh, McDonough, O'Donoghue and Dunphy among others are derived from the given name (In Gaelic: Mac – son of, Ó – of the family of). Another derivation is the name of the Scottish Clan Donnachaidh.

== Variations ==
Old Irish	Modern Irish	Hiberno-English	Scottish Gaelic	Scottish English
Donnchad(h)	Donncha	Donagh	Donnchadh ([ˈt̪ɔn̪ˠɔxəɣ])	Duncan

== People ==
Notable people with the name include:

=== Modern ===
- Donogh O'Malley (1921–1968) Irish Government minister
- Donncha Ó Dúlaing (1933–2021) Irish broadcaster
- Donncha O'Callaghan (born 1979), international rugby player (Munster, Ireland and 2005 British and Irish lions)
- Donnchadh Ó Corráin (1942–2017), Irish historian
- Donnchadh Walsh (born 1984), Irish Gaelic footballer
- Donnchadh Ó Laoghaire (born 1989), Irish Sinn Féin politician and TD for Cork South–Central

=== Historical ===
- Kings in Ireland
  - Donnchad Donn (Donnchad mac Flainn), High King 918–942
  - Donnchad mac Briain, self-styled High King 1024–1026 (with opposition); son of Brian Boru
  - Donnchad Midi of Clann Cholmáin, King of Mide (died 797)
  - Donnchad mac Domnall Claen of the Uí Dúnlainge, King of Leinster (deposed 1003)
  - Donnchad mac Cellacháin (died 963), King of Cashel (or Munster)
- Kings of Alba or Scotland
  - Donnchad mac Crínáin (also Donnchad ua Maíl Coluim) (ruled 1034–1040)
  - Donnchad mac Maíl Coluim (born 1065x1069, killed 1094)
- Kings of Dál Riata (ancient Gaelic kingdom in western Scotland and north east Ireland)
  - Dúnchad mac Conaing (or Dúnchad mac Dúbain) (died c. 654)
  - Dúnchad Bec (died 721)
- Mormaers in Scotland
  - Donnchadh, Earl of Carrick
  - Donnchad I, Earl of Fife
  - Donnchad II, Earl of Fife
  - Donnchadh III, Earl of Fife
  - Donnchadh IV, Earl of Fife
  - Donnchadh, Earl of Lennox
  - Donnchadh, Earl of Mar
  - Donnchadh of Argyll
- Other people
  - Dunchad I of Iona, Abbot of Iona, Inner Hebrides
  - Donnchadh Ó Briain, Irish politician (1897–1961)
  - Donnchad Baccach Ó Maolconaire (died 1404), poet and historian
  - Duncan Ban MacIntyre (Donnchadh Bàn Mac an t-Saoir), Scottish poet (1724–1812)
  - Donnchadh Ó Corráin, Irish historian
  - Donnchadh MacRath, Scottish poet
  - Donnchadh de Strathearn, bishop of Dunkeld, Scotland

== See also ==
- List of Irish-language given names
