= Peter Donahue =

Peter Donahue or Donohue is the name of:

- Peter Donahue (businessman) (died 1885), founder of industrial San Francisco
- Peter Donohue (educator), British education official in Hong Kong
- Peter M. Donohue, Roman Catholic priest and president of Villanova University
- Pete Donohue (1900–1988), baseball pitcher

== See also ==
- Peter O'Donohue (1923–2012), Australian rules footballer
- Peter Donohoe (disambiguation)
