= Donohue =

Donohue is a surname of Irish origin abbreviated from O'Donohue (Irish: Ó Donnachú). Notable people with the surname include:

- Adam Donohue (born 1990), Australian rules footballer
- Charles D. Donohue (1880–1928), New York politician and judge
- David Donohue (born 1967), American race car driver, also a chef from Maryland
- Erin Donohue (born 1983), American Track & Field athlete
- Harold Donohue (1901–1984), American politician
- Jack Donohue (disambiguation), several people
- Jerry Donohue (1920–1985), American theoretical and physical chemist
- Jim Donohue (1937–2017), American baseball player
- Kathleen Donohue (born 1963), American plant biologist
- Keith Donohue (disambiguation), several people
- Kether Donohue (born 1985), actress
- Larry Donohue (born 1955), former Australian rules footballer
- Leon Donohue (1939-2016), American football player
- Mark Donohue (1937–1975), American racecar driver
- Mark Donohue (linguist) (born 1967), British-Australian linguist
- Mary Donohue (born 1947), New York lieutenant governor and judge
- Niall Donohue (1990–2013), Irish hurler
- Nigel Donohue (born 1969), British judoka
- Pat Donohue (born 1953), American fingerstyle guitarist
- Pete Donohue (1900–1988), American baseball player
- Peter M. Donohue (21st century), American Roman Catholic priest
- Scott Donohue (born 1982), English artist
- Sean Donohue (born 1981), founder of horror rock band Hard Rock Zombie and co-founder of industrial rock band Ruse of Silence. Also known for his work as Villain.
- Thomas J. Donohue (born 1938), President and CEO of the United States Chamber of Commerce
- Tom Donohue (born 1952), retired professional baseball player
- William Anthony Donohue (born 1947), American president of the Catholic League for Religious and Civil Rights in the United States
- William J. Donohue (c. 1873 – 1907), New York politician
- William L. Donohue, Canadian pathologist, the namesake of the Donohue syndrome

== See also ==
- Donohue Peak
- Donahue
- Donoghue (disambiguation)
- Donohue Inc., a former Canadian pulp and paper manufacturer
- O'Donohue
