= Donohoe =

Donohoe or O'Donohoe is an Irish surname, reduced Anglicized form of Gaelic Ó Donnchadha ‘descendant of Donnchadh’, a personal name (sometimes Anglicized as Duncan in Scotland), composed of the elements donn = ‘brown-haired man’ or ‘chieftain’ + cath = ‘battle’.

Spelling variations (which may include an initial O' or omit it) include Donoghue, Donaghoe, Donaho, Donahoe, Donough, Donahue, Donahow, Doneghoe, Donehue, Donighue, Donoho, Donahugh, Donohough, Donohow, Donohue, Donaughue, Dunphy, Donaghie, Donaghy and many more.

First found in County Kerry, Ireland, where they held a family seat from very ancient times.

The Scottish Clan Robertson, anciently known as Clann Dhònnchaidh, 'Children of Dònnchadh' or Duncan, is of separate origin.

Notable people with the surname include:

- Alistair Donohoe (born 1995), Australian cyclist
- Amanda Donohoe, English actress
- Brian Donohoe, Member of Parliament (United Kingdom) for Central Ayrshire (UK Parliament constituency)
- Elinor Donahue, Irish-American actress best known from the television shows Father Knows Best and The Andy Griffith Show
- John Donahoe, President and CEO of Nike
- John E. O'Donoghue, Major League Baseball pitcher
- John P. O'Donoghue, Major League Baseball pitcher
- Lowitja O'Donoghue, Aboriginal Australian civil rights activist
- Martin O'Donoghue, Irish economist and Fianna Fáil politician
- Michael O'Donoghue, Irish-American comedian, writer and occasional performer for Saturday Night Live
- Owen Donohoe (1945-2026), American politician
- Patrick O'Donoghue, Irish-born current Roman Catholic Bishop of Lancaster in England
- Peter Donohoe (disambiguation)
- Peter O'Donoghue (disambiguation), multiple people
- Patrick R. Donahoe, the 73rd Postmaster General of the United States
- Phil Donahue, Irish-American journalist and talk show host
- Thomas Donohoe, Scottish immigrant, pioneer of football in Brazil
