= Dunchad =

Dunchad may refer to any of several historical figures, several of them of the Clan Duncan; see also Donnchadh:

- Dúnchad Muirisci (died 683), king of Connacht
- Dunchad I of Iona, abbot of Iona 707-717
- Cellach mac Dunchad, one of the kings of Leinster
- Dúnchad mac Conaing or Dúnchad mac Dubáin, king of Dál Riata (died 654)
- Dúnchad Bec (died 721), a king in Dál Riata
- Duchad of Reims, master of one of the Carolingian Schools important in the Carolingian Renaissance
- Duchad, abbot of Dunkeld, killed in the battle of Dorsum Crup (Duncrub in Perthshire), 965
- A "Dunchad" was the ninth-century writer of glosses on Martianus Capella's didactic encyclopedia
