= Donahue =

Donahue is the Americanized version of Irish surname Donohoe, which, in turn, is an Anglicized version of the ancient Irish name "Donnchadh" (sometimes "Donncha").

Donncha was a common “first name” in 9th century Ireland, and when the use of surnames became more common in Ireland around the 10th Century, many people looked to a respected common ancestor to form a surname. The ancestors of the modern Donahues took the name O’Donnchadha, meaning "the son of Donnacha" or "of the line of Donnacha". The modern Donahues are descended from one of at least eight unrelated Donnachas, each of whose descendants adopted the surname O’Donnchadha.

There are eight known O'Donoghue tribal areas in Ireland; in Munster the areas of Tipperary, Cork and Kerry, then there are Kilkenny, Wicklow, Dublin and Meath in Leinster and in Connaught there are Galway, Mayo, Sligo and Cavan. Considerable migration took place over the centuries and family groups took root in many other counties (e.g. Clare, Limerick, Waterford, Roscommon, and others), which would today be recognised as their areas of origin.

The Donohoes of the ancient Kingdom of Breifne, centered in modern-day County Cavan, are genetically linked to 4th-century Irish warlord Niall of the Nine Hostages.

When the name O’Donnchadha became Anglicized, at least 30 different spellings developed in Ireland, but by the 19th century the most common spelling was Donohoe. Of 2,800 families reporting variations of the name at the time of Griffith's Valuation (1847–1864), 2,483, or 88%, were listed as Donohoe. None were listed as Donahue. The name distribution geographically during this same period reflects that there were significant clusters of Donohoes found in various parts of Ireland, including County Cavan, County Cork, County Galway, and County Kerry.

The name Donahue may refer to the following people:

- Ann Donahue (born 1955), American television writer
- Archie Donahue (1917–2007), American Marine flying ace during World War II
- Art Donahue (1913–1942), American pilot who flew for the Royal Air Force during the Battle of Britain
- Chris Donahue (producer) (fl. 1996–present), American film and television producer
- Chris Donahue (born 1969), American general
- Cornelius Donahue (1850–1878), American Old West outlaw
- Dylan Donahue (born 1992), American football player
- Edward Donahue, American college sports coach
- Elinor Donahue (born 1937), American actress
- Heather Donahue (born 1974), American actress
- Jack Donahue (1804–1830), Australian outlaw
- Jack Donahue (dancer) (1888–1930), American dancer and comedian
- Jerry Donahue (born 1946), American guitarist
- Jiggs Donahue (1879–1913), American baseball player
- Jim Donahue (1862–1935), American baseball player
- Joe Donahue (actor) (1899–1943), American dancer and film actor
- John Donahue (baseball), American baseball player
- John F. "Jack" Donahue, American founder of Federated Investors
- Jonathan Donahue, American rock guitarist
- Joseph Donahue (poet) (born 1954), American poet
- Joseph Patrick Donahue (1870–1959), American Catholic bishop
- Laura Kent Donahue (born 1949), American politician
- Margaret Donahue (1892–1978), American baseball executive
- Megan Donahue, American astronomer
- Mike Donahue (1871–1960), American athlete and football coach
- Pat Donahue (1884–1966), American baseball player
- Patty Donahue (1956–1996), American New Wave singer
- Phil Donahue (1935–2024), American talk show host
- Francis Rostell "Red" Donahue (1873–1913), American baseball player
- Sam Donahue (1918–1974), American saxophonist
- Terry Donahue (1944–2021), American football coach and executive
- Terry Donahue (baseball) (1925–2019), Canadian professional baseball player
- Thomas Michael Donahue (1921–2004), American astronomer
- Thomas R. Donahue (1928–2023), American organized labor activist
- Tim Donahue (1870–1902), American baseball player
- Timothy Donahue, American executive
- Tom Donahue (DJ) (1928–1975), American disc jockey, record producer and concert promoter
- Tom Donahue (filmmaker) (born 1968), American film director and producer
- Troy Donahue (1936–2001), American actor

== See also ==
- Donoghue (disambiguation)
- Donohue, a surname
- O'Donoghue
- General Donahue (disambiguation)
- Justice Donahue (disambiguation)
- Senator Donahue (disambiguation)
