= William Donahue =

William Donahue may refer to:

- William J. Donahue, United States Air Force general
- William Donahue (Quebec politician) (1834–1892)

== See also ==
- Bill Donohue (born 1947), president of the Catholic League in the United States
- William J. Donohue (1873–1907), American politician from New York
- William Donohue (jockey), Canadian jockey and trainer
