= Donoghue =

Donoghue may refer to:

== Law ==
- Donoghue v Stevenson, 1932
- Donoghue v. Allied Newspapers Ltd., 1938; see Authorship and ownership in copyright law in Canada
- Donoghue v Folkestone Properties Ltd, 2003

== People ==
- Denis Donoghue (academic) (1928–2021), Irish literary critic
- Denis Donoghue (rugby league) (1926–1993), Australian rugby league player
- Eileen Donoghue (born 1954), attorney
- Emma Donoghue, Irish-born playwright, literary historian and novelist
- Francis E. Donoghue (1872–1952), politician
- Joe Donoghue (1871–1921), speed skater
- John Donoghue (writer) (born 1964), British humourist and travel writer
- John Francis Donoghue
- John P. Donoghue (born 1957), American politician
- John Talbott Donoghue (1853–1903), American artist
- Lee Donoghue (born 1983), New Zealand actor
- Liam Donoghue (born 1974), Irish sportsperson
- Patrick Donoghue, footballer
- Philip Donoghue (born 1971), British palaeontologist
- Raymond Donoghue (1920–1960), Australian tram driver
- Richard Donoghue, American attorney and prosecutor, former United States deputy attorney general (2020–2021)
- Roger Donoghue (1930–2006), prizefighter
- Steve Donoghue (1884–1945), English flat-race jockey
- Tarah Donoghue
- William F. Donoghue Jr. (1921–2002), American mathematician

== See also ==
- Donahue
- Donahoe
- Donohue
- O'Donoghue
- O'Donohue
