= Donahoe =

Donahoe is a surname. Notable people with the surname include:

- Art Donahoe (born 1940), former lawyer and political figure in Nova Scotia, Canada
- Eileen Donahoe, appointed by President Barack Obama as U.S. Ambassador to the United Nations Human Rights Council in Geneva, Switzerland
- Emily Donahoe, American actress and producer
- John Donahoe (born 1960), American businessman who served as president and CEO of eBay from 2008 to 2015
- Jonny Donahoe, British comedian, writer and performer
- Patrick A. Donahoe, appointed Santa Clara University's 24th president
- Patrick Donahoe (1811–1901), publisher who founded influential magazines for the Irish Catholic community
- Patrick R. Donahoe, the 73rd United States Postmaster General, appointed in 2010
- Richard Donahoe, Q.C., K.S.G. (1909–2000), Canadian lawyer and politician
- Terry Donahoe (1944–2005), former Nova Scotia opposition leader, cabinet minister, and MLA
- Tom Donahoe, senior director of player personnel for the Philadelphia Eagles

== See also ==
- Donahoe Act or California Master Plan for Higher Education of 1960
- Donahue, a surname
- Donohue, a surname
- Donoghue (disambiguation)
