= Indirect infringement in Canadian copyright law =

Canadian copyright law terminology

"Authorization" and "secondary infringement" are two instances of "indirect infringement" in Canadian copyright law. In cases of indirect infringement, individuals can be held liable for infringement even where they did not personally make copies of the copyrighted subject-matter. This expands the scope of liability. The Canadian courts have dealt with these concepts in a number of cases, several of which will be elaborated upon below.

== Authorization ==
A copyright owner has the right to authorize any of the acts found in S. 3(1) of the Copyright Act [see below]. Anyone who grants, or purports to grant, the right to reproduce or perform a work has authorized it. He is liable for copyright infringement.

=== Related provisions in the Canadian Copyright Act ===
S. 27(1): Infringement Generally: It is an infringement of copyright for any person to do, without the consent of the owner of the copyright, anything that by this Act only the owner of the copyright has the right to do.

S. 3. (1): For the purposes of this Act, "copyright", in relation to a work, means the sole right to produce or reproduce the work or any substantial part thereof in any material form whatever, to perform the work or any substantial part thereof in public or, if the work is unpublished, to publish the work or any substantial part thereof, and includes the sole right

(a) to produce, reproduce, perform or publish any translation of the work,

(b) in the case of a dramatic work, to convert it into a novel or other non-dramatic work,

(c) in the case of a novel or other non-dramatic work, or of an artistic work, to convert it into a dramatic work, by way of performance in public or otherwise,

(d) in the case of a literary, dramatic or musical work, to make any sound recording, cinematograph film or other contrivance by means of which the work may be mechanically reproduced or performed,

(e) in the case of any literary, dramatic, musical or artistic work, to reproduce, adapt and publicly present the work as a cinematographic work,

(f) in the case of any literary, dramatic, musical or artistic work, to communicate the work to the public by telecommunication,

(g) to present at a public exhibition, for a purpose other than sale or hire, an artistic work created after June 7, 1988, other than a map, chart or plan,

(h) in the case of a computer program that can be reproduced in the ordinary course of its use, other than by a reproduction during its execution in conjunction with a machine, device or computer, to rent out the computer program, and

(i) in the case of a musical work, to rent out a sound recording in which the work is embodied,

and to authorize any such acts

=== Supreme Court definition of "authorization": CCH v LSUC ===
The Supreme Court of Canada defines and discusses the definition of "authorization" in a 2004 case, CCH Canadian Ltd. v. Law Society of Upper Canada. In this case, the LSUC, which maintains and operates the Great Library at Osgoode Hall, engaged in two relevant behaviours.

- It made photocopies of CCH's copyrighted law reports for library members
- It provided self-service photocopy machines for use by library members

The relevant issue for the court with regard to "authorization" is whether the Law Society authorized copyright infringement by maintaining self-service photocopy machines, allowing members to illegally photocopy copyrighted material. The court found that it did not. In the court’s analysis, it concluded that "authorization" in Canadian Copyright law has the following characteristics:

1. The definition of "authorize" is to "sanction, approve, countenance."
2. "Countenance" in the context of authorizing copyright infringement, must be understood in the strongest dictionary meaning, namely "give approval to, sanction, permit, favour, encourage."
3. Authorization is a question of fact that depends on the circumstances of each particular case and can be inferred from acts that are less than direct and positive, including a sufficient degree of indifference. (For example, if there is a sufficient degree of control, passivity may be taken as authorization.)
4. A person does not authorize infringement by authorizing the mere use of equipment [such as services and technologies that have a dual use (one which is infringing and one which is not, i.e. photocopier) that could be used to infringe copyright].
5. Courts should presume that a person who authorizes an activity does so only so far as it is in accordance with the law. That is, there is a presumption that there is no knowledge of the infringing activity of potential primary infringers. Moreover, knowledge is not enough to attach liability. There must also be some legal capacity to control the activity of the primary infringer. Thus, the presumption can be rebutted if it is shown that a certain relationship or degree of control existed between the alleged authorizer and the persons who committed the copyright infringement.

However, some aspects of authorization remain unclear. While "authorization" is considered a primary infringement (rather than secondary infringement, which will be discussed later), it is not clear whether liability for authorizing infringement requires that actual infringement has taken place. According to Vaver, an expert in the field, actual infringement is required. According to University of Toronto Law Professor, Ariel Katz, the decision in CCH is policy driven: preventing photocopying in libraries would shift the balance of copyright too far in favour of owner’s rights, and unnecessarily interfere with the proper use of copyrighted works for the good of society as a whole.

=== Authorization and peer-to-peer networks: BMG Canada v John Doe ===
BMG was an attempt by the record companies to sue individuals for copyright infringement of their songs. The court said that, according to S. 80(1) of the Copyright Act, making a personal copy of a sound recording for one's own private purposes is not infringement. The record companies went further, suggesting that the individuals were involved in authorization of copyright infringement, since they were members of a peer (shared) network. The court disagreed, and suggested that there is no difference between making personal copies and making a shared folder. The court uses an analogy: there is no difference between a library full of copyrighted materials with a self-service photocopier, per CCH, and making a shared folder on the Internet. Therefore, the mere fact of placing a copy on a shared directory in a computer where that copy can be accessed via a peer-to-peer service does not amount to distribution, and hence authorization. According to the case, "before it constitutes distribution, there must be a positive act by the owner of the shared directory, such as sending out the copies or advertising that they are available for copying." Some experts, such as University of Toronto Law Professor Ariel Katz, suggest that the analogy to CCH is flawed, since library use is far more constrained and requires higher transaction costs than does Internet use.

== Secondary infringement ==
A person is a secondary infringer where he knows or should have known that a work either a) infringes a copyright or, b) would infringe a copyright had it been made in Canada (hypothetical infringement test) and, without the consent of the copyright owner he does anything set out in S. 27(2) of the Copyright Act [see below]. If a person turns a blind eye or honestly but mistakenly believes the goods are non-infringing, he will still be presumed to have the requisite knowledge. There can only be secondary infringement if there has been a primary infringement.

=== Related provisions in the Canadian Copyright Act ===
S. 27(2) It is an infringement of copyright for any person to

(a) sell or rent out,

(b) distribute to such an extent as to affect prejudicially the owner of the copyright,

(c) by way of trade distribute, expose or offer for sale or rental, or exhibit in public,

(d) possess for the purpose of doing anything referred to in paragraphs (a) to (c), or

(e) import into Canada for the purpose of doing anything referred to in paragraphs (a) to (c),

a copy of a work, sound recording or fixation of a performer’s performance or of a communication signal that the person knows or should have known infringes copyright or would infringe copyright if it had been made in Canada by the person who made it.

=== CCH ===
According to CCH, S. 27(2) requires 3 things:

1. copy must be the product of primary infringement
2. secondary infringer must have known or should have known that he is dealing with a product of infringement
3. secondary dealing must be established (must have been a sale)

=== Supreme Court of Canada: Euro-Excellence v Kraft Canada ===
Euro-Excellence Inc. v. Kraft Canada Inc. involves the plaintiff, Kraft Canada, who sues the defendant, Euro-Excellence, for importing chocolate bars with a copyrighted logo into Canada for the purpose of sale and distribution (parallel importation). Parallel importation takes place where a product is imported from abroad to be sold locally. The issue is whether parallel importation is secondary infringement pursuant to s. 27(2)(e).

The case is composed of four distinct judgments:

1. Justice Rothstein (Majority): (writing for himself, Justice Binnie and Deschamps JJ): Pursuant to s. 27(2)(e), parallel importation is secondary infringement where the parallel importer is an assignee. Where the parallel importation is merely an exclusive licensee (like Euro-Excellence in this case), however, the act of parallel importation is not secondary infringement.
2. Justice Fish: Concurs with Justice Rothstein with respect to the exclusive licensee issue, but does not necessarily agree than liability would have attached to the parallel importer had the copyright holder been an assignee. His concern is that the Act was not meant to be an instrument of trade control to such an extent.
3. Justice Abella (dissent): (writing for herself and Justice McLachlin): The Act does make parallel importation an infringement even where the copyright owner is an exclusive licensee.
4. Justice Bastarache: Finds that a copyrighted logo should not prevent the sale/trade of a non-copyrighted chocolate bar. Section 27(2)(e) covers only copyrighted materials and not merely ancillary attachments to the products.

With four judgments, it is hard to grasp where the law lies. According to Vaver, the case stands for the following: that an exclusive licensee cannot sue the importer of non-copyrighted materials (i.e. the chocolate bars) based on the incidental copyrighted subject matter associated with it (i.e. the wrappers). That is, if the copyright had been assigned to Kraft Canada (rather than exclusively licensed), parallel importation of a genuinely copyrighted product (rather than the incidental copyright of the chocolate wrapper) would be an infringement according to S. 27(2)(e). Therefore, parallel importation of copyright materials is an infringement according to S. 27(2)(e) where the copyright owner is an assignee.

=== Critical analysis: Does S. 27(2)(e) really cover parallel importation? ===
According to intellectual property expert and professor, Ariel Katz, S. 27(2)(e) is not meant to prevent parallel importation and the resulting market arbitrage. Rather, its purpose is to prevent regulatory arbitrage (protecting the integrity of Canada’s regulatory sovereignty). Section 3 of the Copyright Act does not give a general distribution right; it only gives the right to make copies and publish a work if it is unpublished. This means that a copyright owner does not have the right to prevent parallel importation if he owns the copyright in both countries, since he does not have the general right to distribute (so cannot exclude others). Thus, he should not be able to prevent parallel importation merely by assigning his copyright. He cannot assign a right that did not exist in the first place. Moreover, Canadian law does not prevent parallel trade domestically (that is, between provinces), so there is no reason to prevent it internationally.
