= O'Donohue =

O'Donohue is a surname, and may refer to:

- Becky O'Donohue (born 1980), reality television participant
- Daniel Anthony O'Donohue (1931–2019), United States Ambassador to Burma
- Edward O'Donohue (born 1974), Australian politician
- Jessie O'Donohue (born 1980), reality television participant
- John O'Donohue (1956–2008), poet and philosopher
- John F. O'Donohue (1946–2026), American actor
- Michael O'Donohue (1835–1912), Irish-American builder and architect
- Peter O'Donohue (1923–2012), Australian rules footballer
- Ryan O'Donohue (born 1984), American voice actor
- Tony O'Donohue (1933–2022), Irish-born Canadian politician
- William O'Donohue (born 1957), American psychologist

== See also ==
- O'Donoghue
- Donohue
