= Donnacha =

Donnacha is an Irish given name; a variant of Donnchadh. Notable people with the name include:

- Donnacha Cody (born 1985), Irish hurler for the Kilkenny senior team
- Donnacha Dennehy (born 1970), Irish composer
- Donnacha Fahy (born 1979), Irish hurler for Tipperary GAA
- Donnacha O'Brien (born 1998), Irish jockey
- Donnacha O'Dea (born 1948), Irish professional poker player and swimmer
- Donnacha Ryan (born 1983), Irish rugby union player
