= George W. Kavanagh =

American lawyer and politician

George William Kavanagh (1880 – April 4, 1914) was an American lawyer and politician from New York.

== Life ==
He was born in 1880 in Greenpoint, Brooklyn, the son of Murtha H. Kavanagh (1844–1940) and Margaret Kavanagh (1856–1901). He attended St. Anthony's Parochial School and St. Leonard's Academy. He graduated from New York University School of Law, and practiced law in Brooklyn.

Kavanagh entered politics as a Democrat. He was a member of the New York State Assembly (Kings Co., 14th D.) in 1905 and 1906.

He died on April 4, 1914, and was buried at the Calvary Cemetery in Queens.

New York State Assembly
Preceded by John B. Ferre	New York State Assembly; Kings County, 14th District; 1905–1906	Succeeded by William J. Donohue
