= Authorship and ownership in copyright law in Canada =

Authorship and ownership in copyright law in Canada is an important and complex topic which lies at the nexus between Canada's Copyright Act, an important body of case law, and a number of compelling policy motives. Analysis of authorship and ownership of copyrightable works in Canada can proceed by examination of the rules determining the initial allocation of copyrights, rules governing subsequent changes in ownership, and finally rules governing complex works such as compilations.

== Rules determining initial allocation of copyrights ==
Canadian copyright law sets out rules which determine who is to be the first owner of the copyright for a new copyright-able work. The rules cover different groups of people such as the authors of the work, employees who create works in the course of their employment, independent contractors who create works under contracts for services, and academics. It is helpful to think of the rules which set out in initial allocation of copyright as 'default' rules because the whole or a portion of the 'ownership' of the copyright may always be transferred to a different person in a contract of sale.

=== The first owner of the copyright: author ===
Section 13(1) of Canada's Copyright Act states that "[s]ubject to this Act, the author of a work shall be the first owner of the copyright therein." The courts have issued a number of decisions which provide some definition to the concept of who is an author according to Canada's Copyright Act. Two helpful decisions regarding the matter of who is an author are Gould Estate v. Stoddart Publishing Co. Ltd. and Donoghue v. Allied Newspapers Ltd.

=== Gould Estate and Donoghue cases ===
Gould Estate and Donoghue are two cases which help to define what an author is in the terms of the Copyright Act by providing examples of persons who are not authors. It has been stated that "[c]opyright exists in the expression of ideas or information, not in the information of ideas themselves."

In Gould Estate, the Canadian pianist Glenn Gould participates in a number of interviews with a freelance writer, John Carroll, who is gathering material for an article about Gould. Without the information from Glenn Gould to John Carroll, there would be no material for the magazine story. Nevertheless, it is Carroll who writes all of the ideas down into a concrete expression. The case makes it clear that the author is not the person who invents the ideas but is rather the person who fixes them into a concrete expression.

Donoghue is a very similar case on its facts and in its result. Mr. Donoghue was an ex-jockey who is under contract with Allied Newspapers to tell stories about his days racing horses so that the stories may be written down and printed in the newspaper. Although the column when published holds Donoghue out to be the author, the court decided that all of the writing was done by a newspaper staff member. As in Glenn Gould, the person who relates the story or the idea was held not to be the author because they did not fix the story into a concrete form and thereby transform it from an idea to an expression. The notion of fixation at play here is derived from Canadian Admiral Corp. v. Rediffusion Inc.

Gould Estate and Donaghue make it clear that fixation is a necessary condition for authorship, but they do not hold that fixation is a sufficient condition for authorship. So much is clear in Donoghue when Farwell J states that [I]f an author employs a shorthand writer to take down a story which the author is composing, word for word, in shorthand, and the shorthand writer then transcribes it, and the author then has it published, the author and not the shorthand writer is the owner of the copyright. A mere amanuensis does not, by taking down word for word the language of the author, become in any sense the owner of the copyright.

This qualification of the rule of fixation is supported by the facts of Donaghue because the court comments that "I doubt very much whether [Mr. Donaghue] would, unaided, find it easy to write a series of articles for any newspaper at all." This comment by the court reasonably permits the reader to conclude that in the opinion of the court, all of the skill and judgement in the expression of the article derived from the journalist. Consequently, the journalist was more than a mere scribe.

In summary, there is case law which provides that an author in the meaning of section 13(1) of Canada's Copyright Act must fix the work into a semi permanent form, but cannot be a mere amanuensis and must provide the originality and the skill and judgement of that expression.

=== Historical Exceptions to section 13(1): Section 13(2) ===
Section 13(2) of Canada's Copyright Act relates to the copyright in engravings, photographs, and portraits. A past version of the Copyright Act in section 13(2) assigns the copyright in engravings, photographs, and portraits not to the photographer or author but to the purchaser who provided valuable consideration in exchange for the work. In other words, a wedding photographer hired to take pictures at a wedding, will not own the photos rather than the client.

The current government of Canada is presenting a new Bill, Bill C-11, which will legislate a new version of the copyright act in which section 13(2) will vanish. (Bill C-11 was passed and received Royal Assent on June 29, 2012.) The effect of this legislative act will be that the rule for first ownership of copyright in photographs, portraits, and engravings will revert to the general rule in section 13(1). Consequently, it will be the wedding photographer and not the client who will be the first owner of the copyright. If the client wishes to own the copyright in the wedding photos, the client will have to buy the copyright from the photographer in contract.

==== New legislation: section 32.2(f) ====
This modification of the Copyright Act may be of concern to purchasers of photographs who may worry that they will no longer be able to reproduce and share their photographs, or at least will have to incur some transaction cost in bargaining for permission to reproduce or purchase of the copyright. Bill C-11 does foresee this difficulty and provides some remedy in section 32.2(f). Section 32.2(f) will provide that it is not an infringement of copyright to use a photo or portrait for non-commercial purposes if you commissioned the photograph or portrait for valuable consideration. This provision is clearly intended to provide the purchasers of the wedding photos with the ability to enjoy the photos they bought and to share them. However, if a commercial purchaser wished to make copies, or if a non-commercial client wishes to own the copyright, they will need to bargain with the author because section 32.2(f) will not apply and section 13(1)will give first ownership to the author and the section 13(2) exception will be eliminated.

==== Section 13(2) and the Coase theorem: general overview ====
The elimination of section 13(2) provides an opportunity to apply an economic analysis to the allocation of the initial copyright. For this purpose, it is helpful to conduct analysis along the lines of the Coase theorem. Ronald Coase theorized that when transaction costs are very low, the initial allocation of rights is not important from an efficiency standpoint because those persons who know how to put a resource to use in the most productive way will simply purchase the right or the resource from the person who has it because the person who knows how to put a resource to use in the most productive way will be willing to pay more than any other person in order to purchase this right.

The corollary of this theorem is that when transaction costs are not very low, it is important that the first allocation of the copyright be to the person who can make the most productive use of it. Otherwise, the person who knows how to put a resource to use in the most productive way will probably be deterred by the high transaction costs from purchasing that right. This logic may apply to rights such as copyright.

An analysis in terms of Coase's theorem might determine that the rule from section 13(2) is more efficient than the rule in section 13(1) when it comes to products such as wedding photos because it is likely that people who purchase wedding photos will want to make copies. If the copyright is vested in the photographer, then the client would have to ask for permission each time they wanted to copy one of the photos or give a photo or a copy to another person. Each of these requests would create a transaction cost which would decrease the efficiency of exchange and possibly make it more difficult for the person who places the greatest value on the photos to control the copyright. Section 32.2(f) can play an important role in reducing these transaction costs.

==== The Coase theorem applied to section 13(2): Asymmetry of information ====
There is also a second reason why section 13(2) would be more efficient than section 13(1) for items such as wedding photos. This reason is that there is probably asymmetry of information between the photographer and the client, meaning that the photographer is probably aware of the copyright rules while the client is probably not. Under the section 13(2) rule, because the client is initially vested with copyright, the photographer has to ask to buy the copyright from the client if the photographer wants the copyright. In the course of the negotiation, the client would become informed about the law. In this, section 13(2) is efficient in that it creates an incentive for more informed parties to share that information with less informed parties. As there is greater symmetry of information between the parties, transaction costs are less and bargaining is easier. However, if the photographer is the first owner of the copyright, he has no need to ask his client about purchase of the copyright and consequently it is unlikely that the client will learn about the copyright on the photographs.

=== Exceptions to section 13(1): Section 13(3) ===
Section 13(3) of the Copyright Act addresses the subject of work made in the course of employment. In summary, the provision states that if a given copyrightable work was made in the course of employment, the first owner of the copyright is not the author of the work but is instead the employer in question unless there was an agreement to the contrary. There are many exceptions to this general rule such as exceptions for freelancers, journalists, and academics.

==== Section 13(3) and the Coase Theorem ====
It is more efficient for the employer to have the copyright ownership of the work because the employer is probably better organized to put that work to the most productive use. Consequently, even if the default rule did not give the copyright ownership to the employer, the employment contract would probably provide that the employer has the copyright.

==== Freelancer's exception ====
The exclusion of the work authored by freelancers from the rule in section 13(3) is not so much an exception from the rule as an application of the rule, because freelancers are not deemed to be employees under contracts of service. Consequently, the effects of section 13(3), which apply only to works authored by employees under contracts of service, would not apply to freelancers and section 13(1) will apply normally instead.

One legal issue in relation to this application of section 13(3) is to decide on the facts of each case whether a given relationship is an employer-employee relationship under a contract of service, or is rather a relationship between one business man and another, a relationship between a buyer and a freelance independent contractor. David Vaver suggests that this factual determination would be made "according to familiar principles of labour law to determine if she is in business on her own account or is carrying on the business of whoever is paying her."

==== Journalists' exception ====
The exception for journalists is provided within the text of s.13(3) itself. The provision states that in the absence of any agreement to the contrary, journalists would retain a "right to restrain the publication of the work, otherwise than as part of a newspaper, magazine, or similar periodical." In other words, publishers of newspapers have first ownership of copyright over the newspaper as a whole compilation and over the individual articles within it, but the authors of newspaper articles must give permission before a person can republish the article in another format.

==== Academic exception ====
The exception of academics from section 13(3) which makes the academic and not the academic's employer the owner of first copyright in an academic's work and teaching materials is not specifically provided for in statute. Dolmage v. Erskine provides a succinct account of its source: "Academic exception is an implied 'agreement to the contrary' within the meaning of s. 13(3) of the Act." This agreement to the contrary of the terms of section 13(3) need not be written by the academic and the employer into the contract of employment at the time of contract formation, but instead is implied after the fact by the court based on the notion that such is the overwhelming practise in academic institutions and that the parties probably contemplated such a term at contract formation. While this appears to be the custom at the college/university level, whether it applies to high school or other education settings is unsettled in Canadian law. Collective bargaining now tends to resolve this issue.

=== Joint Authorship ===
Vaver states that joint authors will be the first co-owners of a copyright. Presumably, this rule flows from section 13(1) of the Copyright Act. Section 2 of the Copyright Act provides a definition of a work of joint authorship as work in which "the contribution of one author is not distinct from the contribution of the other author [...]" This definition distinguishes works of joint authorship from collective works such as compilations, where it may be evident that the original contribution of the author of one of the constituent works would be distinct from the original contribution of the compiler who arranged and selected the constituent works into a compilation. However, if all of the authors participated in an indistinguishable manner in creating the constituent works and in selecting and arranging the various constituent works, than it would probably be more appropriate to classify such a collaborative work as a work of joint authorship instead of as a compilation.

== Rules governing subsequent changes in ownership ==
Section 13(4) of Canada's Copyright Act states that "[t]he owner of the copyright in any work may assign the right, either wholly or partially, and either generally or subject to limitations[...]" This provision signifies that the first owner of the copyright of a newly created work can sell the copyright or any part thereof to another person. Those sales would be generally governed by the law of contract just like any other contract and so on that count are not interesting in Intellectual Property law terms. However, there are still many intellectual property questions in relation to the transfer of copyright. Many of those questions relate to the different types of transfers which are contemplated by the act and exactly what kind and what extent of intellectual property is conveyed by each of them.

=== Different types of rights ===
Conceptually, there are four types of transfers of copyright. They are (1) ordinary licenses, (2) sole licenses, (3) exclusive licenses, and (4) assignments.

==== Ordinary licence ====
An ordinary licence is merely the permission to do something which would otherwise constitute a copyright infringement. The existence of ordinary licences is a corollary of section 27.(1) of the Copyright Act, which provides that "[i]t is an infringement of copyright for any person to do, without the consent of the owner of the copyright, anything that by this act only the owner of the copyright has the right to do." It is implied in this statutory definition of primary infringement that there is no infringement when the thing is done with consent or permission of the owner of the copyright. In this manner, the copyright act recognizes permissions.

==== Sole licence ====
A sole license is an ordinary licence which is granted to the licensee along with a contractual promise not to provide a similar permission to anyone else.

==== Exclusive licence ====
An exclusive licence is an ordinary licence granted to the licensee along with a contractual promise from the copyright owner not to provide a similar permission to anyone else, and a contractual promise from the copyright owner not to do the licensed activity.

==== Assignment ====
An assignment is simple transfer of the ownership of the copyright. Section 13(5) of the Copyright Act states that "[w]here, under any partial assignment of copyright, the assignee becomes entitled to any right comprised in copyright, the assignee [...] shall be treated for the purposes of this act as the owner of the copyright [...]" Generally, assignments are distinct from exclusive licenses because exclusive licenses are revocable by the owner of the copyright and because exclusive licensees cannot transfer their rights without authorization from the owner.

=== Euro-Excellence v. Kraft ===
One complicated legal matter is the relationship between exclusive licenses and assignments. In Euro-Excellence Inc. v. Kraft Canada Inc., the Supreme Court of Canada considered the question of whether the breach of an exclusive license by a copyright owner would be copyright infringement or merely breach of contract. The deeper question here is whether assignments are really different from exclusive licenses in law, or whether they are two names for the same thing.

==== Dissenting position in Euro-Excellence ====
While maintaining that there was some distinction between assignments and exclusive licenses, the dissent would have held that exclusive licensees had the right under the Copyright Act to sue the original owner of the copyright for copyright infringement. The dissent based this position on section 2.7 of the copyright act, which states that an "exclusive license is an authorization to do any act that is subject to copyright to the exclusion of all others including the copyright owner." According to the dissent, it would rob section s.2.7 of effect and meaning if an exclusive licensee were to be held to have no right of action as against the copyright owner, because in that case the exclusive licensee would have no way to give effect to his right to exclude all others including the copyright owner.

The decision in Euro-Excellence maintains the distinction between assignments and exclusive licenses.

== Ownership in complex works such as compilations ==
There are a number of provisions in the Copyright Act which relate to collaborative works and compilations. For example, both the terms "collective work" and "compilation" are listed among the defined terms in section 2. It is specified that the term compilation may mean "a work resulting from the selection or arrangement of literary, dramatic, musical or artistic works or of parts thereof [...]" Given that a compilation is defined as a work, it is clear that copyright as defined in section 3(1) of the act, namely "the sole right to produce or reproduce the work or any substantial part thereof", may also lie in compilations.

=== Applying section 13.1 to complex works ===
The layering of copyright raises a number of legal questions. Even if a person owns the copyright in a given compilation by virtue of section 13(1) because that person is the author of the compilation has exercised skill and judgement in the selection or arrangement of the constituent works into a compilation.

In order for the owner of the copyright of a compilation not to be infringing the copyright of the constituent works, the statute would have to be interpreted to the effect that the copying the constituent works is not something that "only the owner of the copyright" in the constituent works has a right to do, and that the owner of the compilation also has a right to copy the constituent works. However, this interpretation would also be problematic because it would seem to conflict with another provision in the Copyright Act, namely section 2.1(2).

=== Section 2.1(2) of the Copyright Act ===
Section 2.1(2) provides that "[t]he mere fact that a work is included in a compilation does not increase, decrease or otherwise affect the protection conferred by this Act in respect of the copyright in the work [...]". Professor Ariel Katz has suggested that a more simple and elegant solution to this problem would be to focus on the nature of the permission which gave owners of the copyright in the compilation access to the constituent works in the first place. In other words, a better and more simple answer ought to be found in contract law instead of copyright law.

Therefore, it seems that there is room for uncertainty and debate on the topic of ownership in complex works such as compilations. In Robertson v. Thomson Corp., the Supreme Court of Canada issued an opinion in relation to these questions.

=== Robertson v. Thomson Corp. ===
The matter in Robertson was that freelance journalists brought a class action suit against The Globe and Mail newspaper alleging that the newspaper infringed copyright when it uploaded the freelancers' articles onto online databases and CD-ROMs. It went to the Supreme Court of Canada where a trial was held to determine the facts surrounding what if any was the contractual agreement between the newspaper and the freelance journalists in relation to the articles in question.

Robertson decided that freelance journalists' copyright can stop the republication of their articles onto databases which display one article at a time but not onto CD-ROMs featuring whole newspapers. This outcome flowed from two key findings which are critical in applying the above reason to the facts in this case. First, the court decided that a database where a user may search for discrete articles is in effect a republication of only an individual article and not of a whole newspaper. Second, the court decided that a CD-ROM in which individual articles may only be viewed in the context of a whole newspaper is not a republication of an individual article as an individual work, but is rather a reproduction of the newspaper as a whole as a work. In other words, Robertson decided that the online database was not a compilation, whereas the CD-ROM was a compilation.

When taken to its logical conclusion, this view of the law would seem to be clearly inconsistent with section 2.1(2) because to hold that the copyright owner of the compilation has a positive right to reproduce the compilation necessarily decreases the copyright in the constituent works. The copyright in a constituent element is decreased as soon as the compilation is created because there would come to be no copyright infringement remedy as against the copyright owner of the compilation.

Justice Abella's statement in paragraphs 82 and 83 also raises questions because she justifies the grant of positive rights to reproduce compilations based on the reason that the "ability to produce a collective work in the first place depends on the individual authors' authorization to use the materials that form the compilation." In other words, Justice Abella says that it is okay to allow the creators of compilations to reproduce the constituent works that make up the compilations because they probably already have permission to do so from the owners of the copyrights in the constituent works; she is enlisting contract law in support of the grant of a copyright. However, this reasoning is questionable in this particular case.

=== Policy rationales for the decision in Robertson v. Thomson Corp. ===
Even though the reasoning underlying the conclusion in Robertson seems to contradict section 2.1(2) of the Copyright Act, it is possible to justify the outcome on a policy basis. The motivation to ensure that creators of compilations need not obtain permission from each and every copyright holder of the original constituent works is provided by the Tragedy of the anticommons. Justice Abella indicates that her judgement contemplates the tragedy of the anticommons when at paragraph 71 she cites the "aftermath of the litigation in New York Times Co. v. Tasini, 533 U.S. 483 (2001)." In Tasini, the facts were very similar to those in Robertson and freelance authors got a judgement to prevent The New York Times from posting their articles online. The New York Times reacted to this judgement by simply deleting the articles because of the huge cost of locating and negotiating with each freelancer individually for the right to re-post the articles online. As a consequence, the public was no longer able to consult those articles.

Furthermore, a non-comprehensive database is not as valuable as a comprehensive database. The corollary is that if the newspaper was to locate all of the owners of the copyright in the individual articles, there will be an incentive for each individual copyright holder to hold out because the last person to agree has far more bargaining power. So, the default rule in s. 13(1) works well looking forward, but it creates a huge amount of transaction costs when looking backwards. For this reason, the corollary of the Coase theorem that the initial allocation of rights is important when transaction costs are high might suggest that Justice Abella's conclusion in Robertson is far more efficient then would be a straightforward application of section 2.1(2) of the Copyright Act.
