= Senator Donahue =

Senator Donahue may refer to:

- Laura Kent Donahue (born 1949), Illinois State Senate
- Maurice A. Donahue (1918–1999), Massachusetts State Senate
- Sue Donahue (fl. 2010s), Arizona State Senate
