= Peter O'Donoghue =

Peter O'Donoghue may refer to:

- Peter O'Donoghue (athlete) (born 1971), New Zealand distance runner
- Peter O'Donoghue (officer of arms) (born 1971), British genealogist

== See also ==
- Peter O'Donohue (1923–2012), Australian rules footballer
