= Euro-Excellence Inc v Kraft Canada Inc =

- Supreme Court of Canada

Hearing: January 16, 2007 Judgment: July 26, 2007
- Full case name: Euro‑Excellence Incorporated v Kraft Canada Incorporated, Kraft Foods Schweiz AG and Kraft Foods Belgium SA
- Citations: 2007 SCC 37, [2007] 3 S.C.R. 20
- Docket No.: 31327
- Prior history: Judgment for the plaintiff in the Federal Court of Appeal
- Ruling: Appeal allowed

Court membership
- Chief Justice: Beverley McLachlin; Puisne Justices: Michel Bastarache, Ian Binnie, Louis LeBel, Marie Deschamps, Morris Fish, Rosalie Abella, Louise Charron, Marshall Rothstein

Reasons given
- Majority: Rothstein J., joined by Binnie and Deschamps JJ.
- Concurrence: Fish J.
- Concurrence: Bastarache J., joined by LeBel and Charron JJ.
- Dissent: Abella J., joined by McLachlin C.J.

Laws applied
- Copyright Act, RSC 1985, c C-42

Euro-Excellence Inc v Kraft Canada Inc, 2007 SCC 37, [2007] 3 S.C.R. 20, is a Supreme Court of Canada judgment on Canadian copyright law, specifically on the issue of indirect infringement and its application to parallel importation. Kraft Canada sued Euro-Excellence Inc. for copyright infringement due to their importation of Côte d’Or and Toblerone chocolate bars from Europe into Canada. A majority of the court found that the copyright claim could not succeed, although they split on whether the claim failed due to the rights of an exclusive licensee or due to the scope of copyright law.

== Background ==
Kraft Canada Inc. was the exclusive Canadian importer and distributor of Toblerone chocolate bars since 1990, and the exclusive Canadian distributor of Côte d’Or chocolate bars since 2001. These agreements were entered into with Kraft Foods Belgium SA and Kraft Foods Schweiz AG of Belgium and Switzerland, respectively.

Euro-Excellence was an authorized distributor of Côte d’Or chocolate bars from 1993 until 2000, and was the exclusive Canadian distributor between 1997 and 2000. Their distribution agreement with Kraft expired in 2000 and was not renewed, although they continued to import and distribute the chocolate bars which they legally acquired in Europe. Beginning in 2001, Euro-Excellence also imported Toblerone bars from Europe without authorization.

On October 25, 2002, Kraft Foods Belgium SA registered three Côte d’Or logos and two Toblerone logos as copyrighted works in Canada, and entered into an agreement with Kraft Canada as the exclusive licensee for production and reproduction of the copyrighted logos. Based on the distribution of logos on the chocolate bars, Kraft Canada Inc. sued Euro-Excellence for copyright infringement.

The Federal Court ruled in favour of Kraft Canada, finding that the logos in question were the proper subject matter for copyright, and that they were reproduced contrary to the Copyright Act. The court awarded Kraft Canada $300,000 in damages and issued an order "that the product be rendered non-infringing".

The Federal Court of Appeal allowed in the appeal in part and referred the issue of damages back to the trial judge. However, the trial judge confirmed the original order of $300,000 in damages.

== Judgment of the Court ==
The Supreme Court, in four separate written judgments, considered two legal issues:

1. Is the copyrighted work being "sold" or "distributed" when it is printed on the wrapper of a consumer product?
2. Can an exclusive licensee of a copyright claim protection against secondary infringement when the copyrighted work was produced by the owner-licensor?

A majority of the court decided the case in favour of Euro-Excellence, but there was disagreement on the grounds for why the copyright claim could not succeed.

=== Sale and distribution of copyrighted works ===
Five justices (Rothstein, Binnie, Deschamps, Abella, and McLachlin) held that there was a sale and distribution of a copyrighted work under s. 27 of the Copyright Act. The copyrighted logos were sold as part of the packaging on the chocolate bars, and therefore constituted an infringing sale of a copyrighted work.

Rothstein J., with whom Binnie and Deschamps JJ. concurred, rejected the "merely incidental" doctrine proposed by Bastarache J.:

I see no statutory authority for the proposition that "incidental" works are not protected by the Copyright Act, R.S.C. 1985, c. C-42. This Court's holding in CCH confirms that all artistic works receive the protection of copyright if they meet the requisite standards of "skill and judgment"

Abella J., writing for herself and McLachlin C.J. agreed with Rothstein's position on the issue of the sale of copyrighted works:

There is nothing in the Act to endorse a restrictive definition of "sell". Section 64(3)(b) of the Act extends copyright protection to trade-marks and labels. When a product is sold, title to its wrapper is also transferred to the purchaser. The Act is indifferent as to whether the sale of the wrapper is important to the consumer.

Bastarache J., with whom LeBel and Charron JJ. concurred, would have struck down Kraft Canada's claim based on his interpretation of the Copyright Act, which precluded protection for works which were "merely incidental" to the product being sold.

Bastarache based this interpretation largely on the Supreme Court's rulings in Society of Composers, Authors and Music Publishers of Canada v. Canadian Assn. of Internet Providers and Kirkbi AG v. Ritvik Holdings Inc. to differentiate between the protection afforded by copyright law and trademark law. He held that "[t]he protection offered by copyright cannot be leveraged to include protection of economic interests that are only tangentially related to the copyrighted work."

Fish J., writing for himself, concurred with the majority in result, and agreed with Rothstein J. that the issue should be decided on the basis of the licensing issue, but also expressed doubt as to whether copyright would apply to the claim in this case:

"Without so deciding, I express grave doubt whether the law governing the protection of intellectual property rights in Canada can be transformed in this way into an instrument of trade control not contemplated by the Copyright Act.

=== Rights granted to exclusive licensees ===
In CCH Canadian Ltd. v. Law Society of Upper Canada, the Court held that three elements must be proven to establish secondary infringement:

1. a primary infringement
2. the secondary infringer should have known that he or she was dealing with a product of infringement, and
3. the secondary infringer sold, distributed or exposed for sale the infringing goods

However, due to s. 27(2)(e) of the Copyright Act, where a work in question was imported, only "hypothetical infringement" was necessary instead of primary infringement. Rothstein J. noted that this section protected Canadian copyright holders from parallel importation of copyrighted works, because an infringing work in Canada may not necessarily be infringing in the country of its manufacture. Therefore, s. 27(2)(e) requires, for imported goods, only that the plaintiff prove that the work "would infringe copyright if it had been made in Canada by the person who made it."

Because Euro-Excellence was importing legitimate Côte d’Or and Toblerone chocolate bars from Europe (as opposed to counterfeit goods), Kraft Canada was forced to claim that had Kraft Foods Belgium and Kraft Foods Switzerland manufactured the goods in Canada, they would be infringing the copyright that had been exclusively licensed to Kraft Canada.

The success of this claim depended on whether an exclusive licensee under the Copyright Act (in this case Kraft Canada) could sue the owner/licensor of the copyright (in this case the parent companies Kraft Foods Belgium SA and Kraft Foods Schweiz AG).

Section 2.7 of the Copyright Act defined an "exclusive licensee":

2.7 For the purposes of this Act, an exclusive license is an authorization to do any act that is subject to copyright to the exclusion of all others including the copyright owner, whether the authorization is granted by the owner or an exclusive licensee claiming under the owner.

Five of the justices (Bastarache, LeBel, Charron, Abella, and McLachlin) interpreted s. 2.7 in the Copyright Act to mean that exclusive licensees had the same rights of the owner of a copyright, and that the right to sue the owner was granted in an exclusive license.

The remaining justices (Rothstein, Binnie, Deschamps, and Fish) focused on the distinction between an "assignee", a "non-exclusive licensee", and an "exclusive licensee", interpreting the different categories listed in the Copyright Act to mean that only an assignee could sue the original author or owner for copyright infringement, and that an exclusive licensee could sue all third parties for copyright infringement but not the owner-licensor.

=== Result ===
Although the plaintiffs Kraft Canada Inc. won the legal argument for both issues (whether they were within their rights to sue as an exclusive licensee and whether there was a sale of a copyrighted work), they lost the case due to vote splitting.

Five justices decided that there was a sale of a copyrighted work (Rothstein, Binnie, Deschamps, Abella, and McLachlin), and five justices (Bastarache, LeBel, Charron, Abella, and McLachlin) decided that an exclusive licensee could sue the licensor on the basis of hypothetical infringement. However, seven of the nine justices agreed that the copyright claim could not succeed - Rothstein, Binnie, Deschamps, and Fish allowed the appeal on the licensing issue while Bastarache, LeBel, and Charron allowed the appeal on the sale issue. Only Abella and McLachlin would have found copyright infringement by finding in favour of the plaintiff on both the licensing and sale requirements.

== Aftermath ==
In response to the Supreme Court decision, Kraft Foods Belgium and Kraft Foods Switzerland assigned the copyrights in question to Kraft Canada. Their theory of the case was that an outright assignment of copyright instead of an exclusive license would enable them to succeed against Euro-Excellence in a second case.

A second claim was served against Euro-Excellence on December 3, 2007. On January 8, 2009, Kraft Canada and Euro-Excellence reached an agreement to settle the dispute. Euro-Excellence agreed to stop imports of Côte d’Or chocolate bars without Kraft Canada's consent, and signed a distribution agreement to distribute Côte d’Or chocolates in Quebec on behalf of Kraft Canada.

== See also ==
- Grey market
- Regulatory arbitrage
- Omega S.A. v. Costco Wholesale Corp., a U.S. Ninth Circuit Court of Appeals case deciding a similar issue, affirmed by the Supreme Court of the United States in a 4-4 split
