= Nick Dunphy =

English footballer

Personal information
- Full name: Nicholas Owen Dunphy
- Date of birth: 3 August 1974 (age 52)
- Place of birth: Sutton Coldfield, England
- Position: Defender

Senior career*
Years	Team	Apps	(Gls)
- Rushall Olympic
- Sutton Coldfield Town
- Hednesford Town
1994–1995	Dagenham & Redbridge	3	(0)
1995–1996	Peterborough United	2	(0)
1996	Cheltenham Town	0	(0)
1996–1997	Bromsgrove Rovers	13	(2)
- Blakenall
- Paget Rangers
- Tamworth
- Walsall Wood
- * Club domestic league appearances and goals

Nicholas Owen Dunphy (born 3 August 1974) is an English former footballer who played league football for Peterborough United.

== Playing career ==
Nick Dunphy started his playing career in non league football with the likes of Sutton Coldfield Town, Rushall Olympic and Hednesford Town before signing for Peterborough United before the start on the 1995–1996 season. His stay at the club was short and only appeared in 2 second division matches a total of 18 minutes. His debut coming as a substitute against Crewe Alexandra. During his time at Peterborough Nick spent one month on loan at Dagenham and Redbridge before Nick moved on to Cheltenham Town, Bromsgrove Rovers, Tamworth, Walsall Wood and Blakenall
