= Mark Donohue (linguist) =

British-Australian linguist

- Born: 2 June 1967 (age 59); Portsmouth, United Kingdom
- Occupation: Linguist

Academic background
- Education: Australian National University
- Thesis: The Tukang Besi language of Southeast Sulawesi, Indonesia (1996)

Academic work
- Main interests: Austronesian and Papuan linguistics

Mark Donohue (born 2 June 1967 in Portsmouth, United Kingdom) is a British-Australian linguist. He deals with the description of Austronesian, Papuan, and Sino-Tibetan languages.

He obtained a B.A. in linguistics at the Australian National University in Canberra. In 1996, he defended his doctoral dissertation entitled The Tukang Besi language of Southeast Sulawesi, Indonesia. From 2009 to 2017, he was an associate professor at the Australian National University. In 2017, he was employed by the Living Tongues Institute for Endangered Languages.

== Publications ==
- Bajau: A symmetrical Austronesian language (1996)
- Tone systems in New Guinea (1997)
- Typology and linguistic areas (2004)
- The Papuan language of Tambora (2007)
- A grammar of Tukang Besi (2011)
