= Donogh =

Donogh is a given name. Notable people with the name include:

- Donogh Dáll Ó Derrig, a.k.a. Blind Donogh O'Derrick, Irish rapparee, executed December 1656
- Donogh O'Brien, 4th Earl of Thomond (died 1624), Irish nobleman and soldier noted for his loyalty to the English Crown
- Donogh O'Malley (1921–1968), Irish Fianna Fáil politician
- Donogh Rees (born 1958), New Zealand actress
