= General Donahue =

General Donahue may refer to:

- Christopher T. Donahue (born 1969), U.S. Army major general
- Patrick J. Donahue II (born 1957), U.S. Army lieutenant general
- William J. Donahue (fl. 1960s–2000s), U.S. Air Force lieutenant general

== See also ==
- Patrick J. Donahoe (fl. 1980s–2020s), U.S. Army major general
- David O'Donahue, Wisconsin National Guard brigadier general
