= Scott Donohue =

English artist

Scott Donohue (born 19 August 1982, in Newcastle upon Tyne) is an English contemporary artist who uses a wide range of media to celebrate and critique the modern age. His body of work spans a variety of forms including installation art, mixed media, painting and online interactive projects. He blends fine art techniques with digital media to create a complex, vibrant style. The artist describes his work as "A simultaneous laugh and cry at modern times". Donohue's work is often satirical, poking fun at society's obsession with technology, whilst celebrating sciences potential for positive impact on the future of humanity.

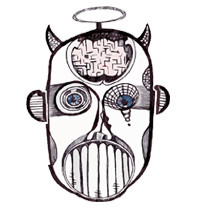
Scott Donohue's avatar (2006) multi-media artist

== Biography ==
Donohue studied a BA/Hons in fine art at Northumbria University (2001–2004), it was here that he first began to experiment with interactive, immersive installations. It was during this time that he witnessed various haunting incidents that would provide impetus for his work. One experience involved witnessing people recording a beating of a man with mobile phones; this would shape an interest in the darker side of the human condition and a concern regarding technologies potential to distance us from the consequences of our actions.

He was accepted for Northumbria University's graduate fellow position for the year following, where he conducted workshops with digital media and created a prolific series of drawings and paintings, developing a unique style, often depicting dystopian visions of the future. His first show was called ‘Field of Vision’, in the Lab Gallery, New York City; he then went on to exhibit throughout Europe. Donohue won the Noise Festivals ‘Elements’ competition (2006) and was invited to 11 Downing Street to discuss strategies for exposing young creative talent with key figures from the creative industries.

In 2007 he appeared in DIGIT magazine in an article titled ‘New British Talent’, later appearing in Novel magazine (2011) in a review titled ‘The Beautiful Chaos of Scott Donohue’ as well as other publications. He continues to focus on environmental issues and how they interlink with the human condition. This led to his involvement with Common Ground, a digital art group focusing attention on our negative impact on the Earth. Donohue exhibited with this group in the A&I Gallery, Hollywood.

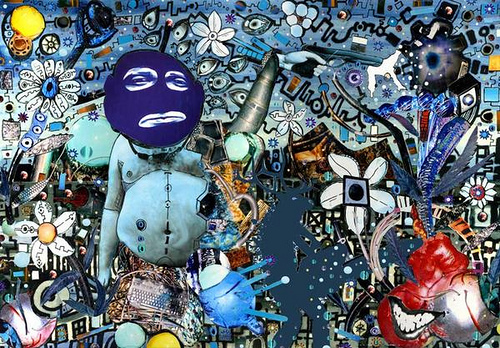
Virtual utopia goes bonkers, mixed media on canvas (2006)

== Selected exhibitions ==
2012–2013 Solo Show, No Need to Nullify, System Gallery, Newcastle upon Tyne, England

When the Monkey Realised, Solo Show, Barkollo Gallery, Newcastle upon Tyne, England 2011 Solo Show, Barkollo Gallery, Newcastle upon Tyne, England

Diverse-City, Mandella Gallery, Newcastle upon Tyne, England

2010 Common Ground, A&I Gallery, Hollywood, 933 N. Highland Ave, Los Angeles, United States.

Secret Artist exhibition, NOISELAB, Manchester, England

2008 Common Ground, Huan Tie Art Museum, Beijing, China

2007 The Gateway to the Quarter project, Finkle Street, York, UK.

The Brain Project, Trieste, Italy.

2006 Solo show, People Love Machines, Edinburgh Fringe Festival, The Bongo Club, Scotland.

Noise Festival Exhibitions, The Urbis Gallery, Manchester, UK.

Mystery artist Exhibition, Switch Gallery, London, UK.

2005 People Love Machines, Black Sun Press, The Side Cinema, Newcastle upon Tyne, UK.

Field of vision, Extremes, Institute for New Media, Frankfurt am Main, Germany.

Epoch Exhibitions, Meeting House Square, Dublin.

2004 Field of Vision, Lab Gallery, New York, USA.

Sakaide Grandprix Drawing Exhibition, Japan.

== Selected publications ==
2012- Catapult Magazine, The Art of Scott Donohue, Issue 9, http://www.magcloud.com/browse/issue/380406

TURPS Magazines, More, More, More, Issue 10, http://turpsmag.co.uk/Mags/Index.html#!

HESA InPrint, Addiction, Issue 7, http://hesainprint.com/

2011-Novel Magazine, The Beautiful Chaos of Scott Donohue, (first edition) http://www.novelmagazine.co.uk

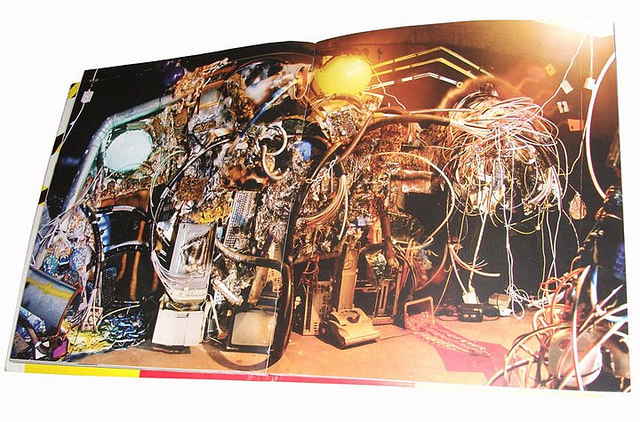
Crossfields: Access: In almost every picture (Wire Design Ltd) double page spread of installation, People Love Machines, 2005

2007- DIGIT Magazine, New British Talent, (March edition) http://www.digitmag.co.uk

2006- DIGIT Magazine, Noise Festival, (October edition) http://www.digitmag.co.uk

2005- Crossfields: Access: In almost every picture (Wire Design Ltd) ISBN 9780954985608 http://www.wiredesign.com/page/selected_projects/crossfields_1_access/24,0,0,0.html

2004- TIG Magazine: Issue 0: 'Electricities' (Panorama Publishing) http://www.tigweb.org/youth-media/magazine/index.html?method=issue0

2005- Aesthetica Magazine: Issue 9 (Federico & Donley Publishers) ISSN 1743-2715 http://www.aestheticamagazine.com/

2004- The Wow Signal.
