= Dunphy =

Dunphy is an Irish surname derived from Donohoe. It may refer to:

== People ==
- Chris Dunphy (born 1950), Football (Soccer) Chairman
- Don Dunphy (1908–1998), American broadcaster
- Éamon Dunphy (born 1945), Irish footballer and broadcaster
- Fran Dunphy (born 1948), American basketball coach
- Jack Dunphy (1914–1992), American author
- Jerry Dunphy (1921–2002), American broadcaster
- Jessica Dunphy (born 1984), American actress
- Kristen Dunphy, Australian television screenwriter and producer
- Larry Dunphy (born 1952), American politician
- Melissa Dunphy (born 1980), Australian-American classical composer
- Michelle Dunphy, American politician from Maine
- Myles and Milo Dunphy (1928–1996), Australian conservationists
- Nick Dunphy (born 1974), English footballer
- Tom Dunphy, (1937–2025), Canadian politician
- Martin Dunphy (born 1966) Irish businessman

== Fictional characters ==
- Claire Dunphy, Phil Dunphy, Haley Dunphy, Luke Dunphy and Alex Dunphy, and other family members, on the American television series Modern Family
- Dennis Dunphy, in Demolition Man (character)
- Timothy "Dildo" Dunphy, in the novel and film Outside Providence
