= Michael O'Donohue =

American architect

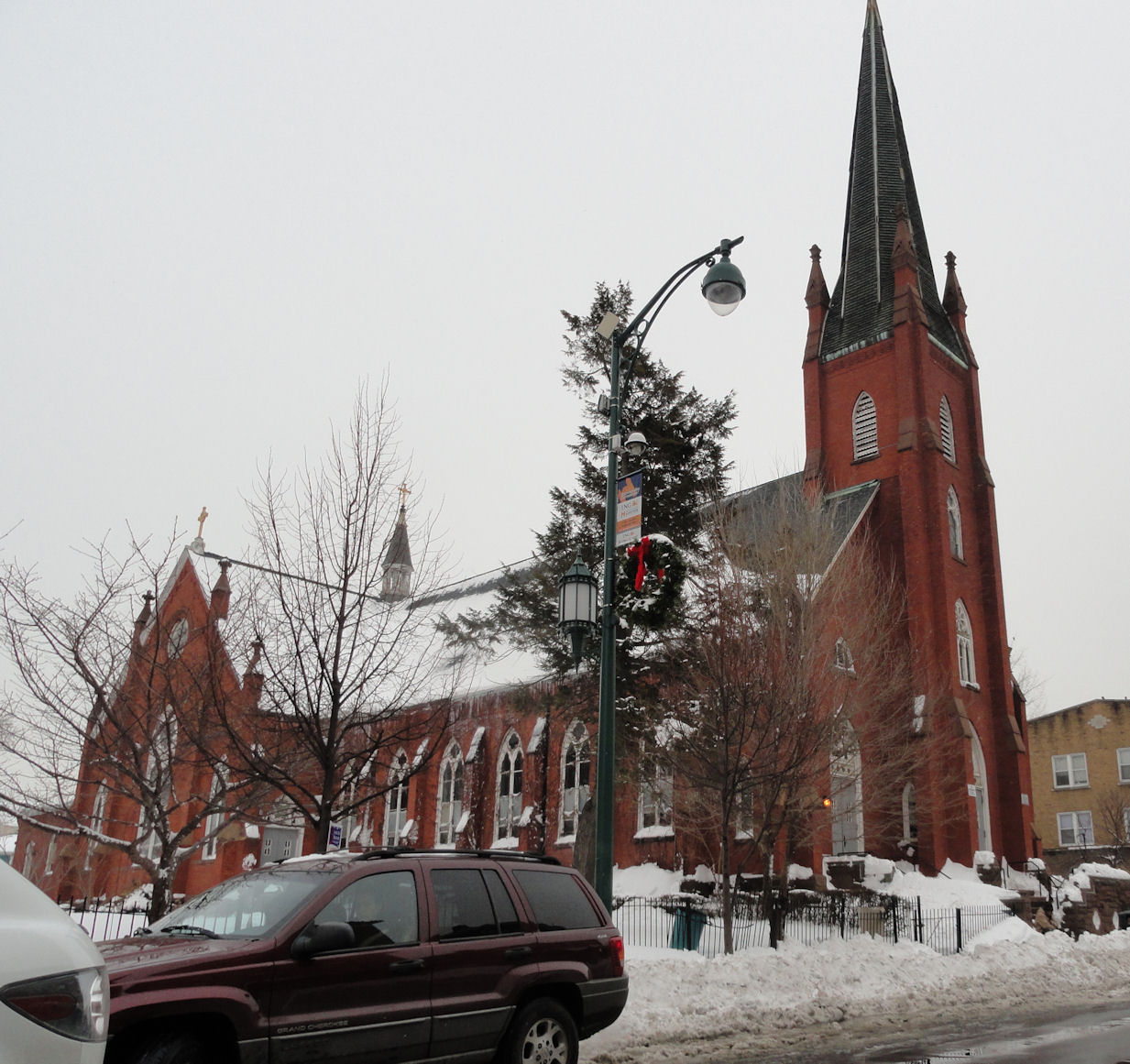
- Former Immaculate Conception Church, Hartford, Connecticut
- Born: 1835; Ireland
- Died: December 19, 1912 (aged 77); Hartford, Connecticut

Michael O'Donohue (1835 – December 19, 1912) was an Irish-American builder and architect from Hartford, Connecticut who designed a number of ecclesiastical buildings in New England for both Roman Catholic and Jewish clients.

== Early life and career ==
O'Donohue was born in 1835 Ireland and immigrated to America in 1872. Little is known of his life before his relocated to Hartford.

== Architectural practice ==
In 1890 he moved to Hartford, Connecticut where he established an architectural practice under his own name. He carried on an active business as a designer of Catholic churches in the Gothic Revival style. O'Donohue is one of the few architects of Catholic churches to have also built for non-Catholic clients as well.

He died at his home in Hartford on December 19, 1912.

=== Legacy ===
O'Donohue is not as significant a figure in 19th century American Catholic architecture as his fellow countrymen and contemporaries Patrick. C Keely, James Murphy, or Patrick W. Ford. Nonetheless his work is appreciated today and several of his buildings have been selected to National Registers.

== Works ==
=== Connecticut ===
- Our Lady of Sorrows School, Hartford, Connecticut
- Ados Israel Synagogue, Hartford, Connecticut
- LaSalette Seminary, Hartford, Connecticut (Central portion of present building, wings added by O'Connell and Shaw)
- Former Immaculate Conception Church, Hartford, Connecticut
- St. Ann Church, Hartford, Connecticut (replaced by present building by Henry F. Ludorf)
- St. Anthony of Padua Church, Litchfield, Connecticut (burned 1944, replaced by Oliver Reagan)
- St. Mary Rectory, New Britain, Connecticut (church by Patrick. C. Keely)
- St. Mary Church, Union City, Connecticut
- Sacred Heart Church, Hartford, Connecticut (first church, later completed by George A. Zunner)
- St. Peter Church, New Britain, Connecticut
- St. Mary's Parochial School (1888 section) Windsor Locks, CT

=== New York ===
- St Francis DeSales Church, Phoenicia, New York

=== Rhode Island ===
- Unnamed church, Providence, Rhode Island
