= Peter Donohue (educator) =

Peter Donohue Tang Luxiao
- Born: 3 September 1910; Doncaster, South Yorkshire, UK
- Died: November 25, 1976 (aged 66); Douglas, Isle of Man, UK
- Occupation: Colonial education official

Peter Donohue (Chinese: 唐露曉; Cantonese Yale: tong4 lou6 hiu2; pinyin: Tangluxiao; 3 September 1910 – 25 November 1976) was a British colonial education official who served as the Director of Education of Hong Kong and an official member of the Legislative Council of Hong Kong from April 1961 to February 1964.

Donohue was transferred from Trinidad to the Education Department of Hong Kong in 1949. He initially worked as a senior mathematics teacher at King George V School, became the principal of the school the following year, and was subsequently appointed as Senior Education Officer in April 1952, Assistant Director of Education in September 1955, and Deputy Director of Education in December 1959. During his tenure as Director of Education, he committed to expanding primary and secondary education, participated in the preparation and establishment of The Chinese University of Hong Kong, and supported the development of adult education and special education. Furthermore, he shortened the school system of Chinese middle schools from a six-year system to a five-year system to align it with that of English secondary schools.

However, his continued implementation of the modern school scheme and the introduction of the "Donohue Scheme" in 1962 to reorganize the primary and secondary school systems provoked significant public backlash. Among the proposals, the "Donohue Scheme's" recommendations to delay the primary school entry age, shorten the primary school system, and establish a special secondary school curriculum were directly criticized by the Hong Kong Government's *Marsh-Sampson Report* (1963), the *Report of the Working Committee* (1965), and the *White Paper on Education Policy* of the same year. The modern school scheme was eventually halted in 1964, and the measures implemented through the "Donohue Scheme" were not fully withdrawn until 1968. At the age of only 52, Donohue retired and returned to Britain in February 1964 due to health reasons, stepping down from the post of Director of Education after serving for only two years and eight months, and was succeeded by Jian Naijie, the former Permanent Secretary of the Ministry of Education in Kenya, who was brought in to replace him. On 25 November 1976, he passed away from illness in Douglas, the capital of the Isle of Man, at the age of 66.

== Biography ==
=== Early life ===
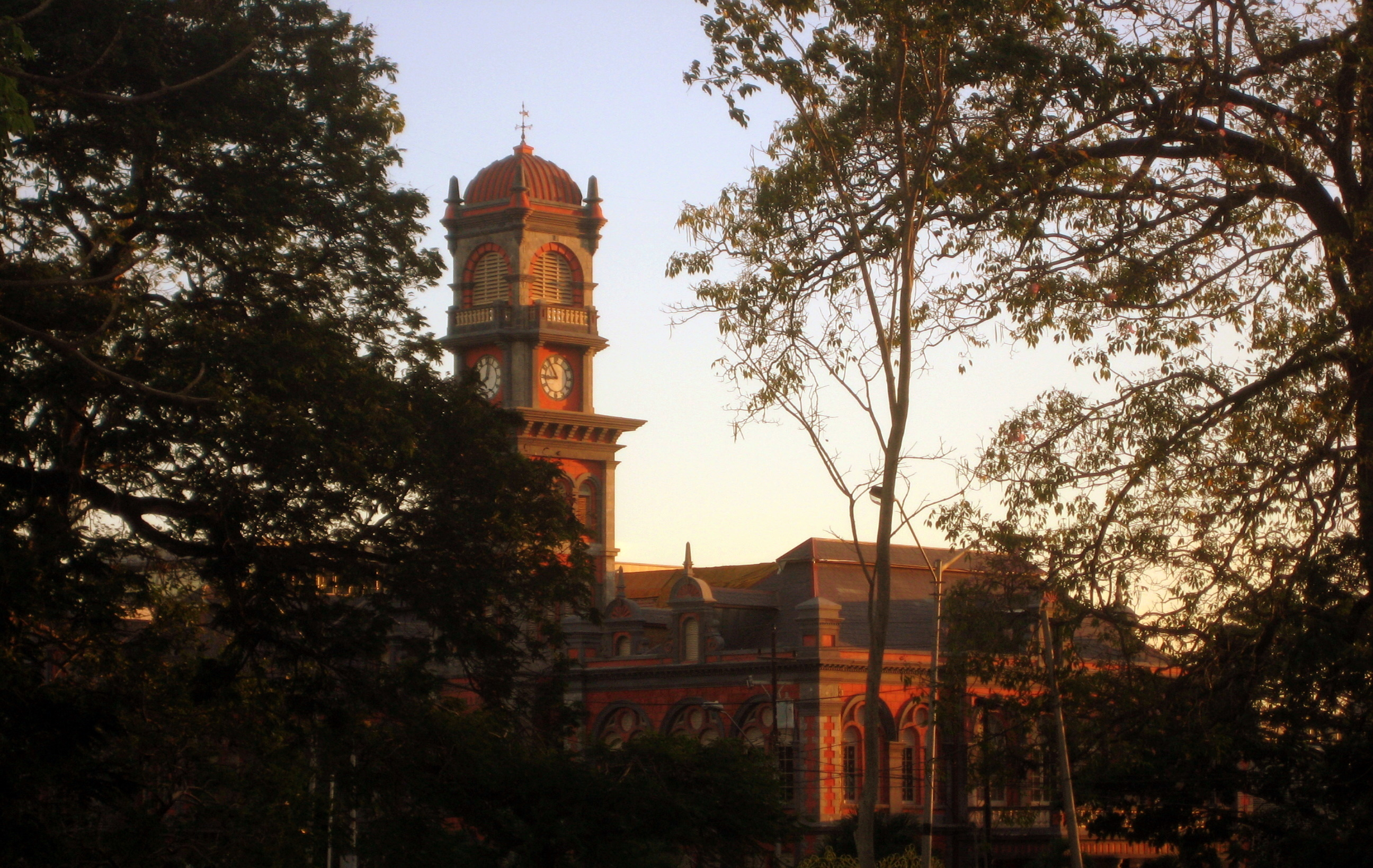
Donohue taught at Queen's Royal College in Trinidad in his early years

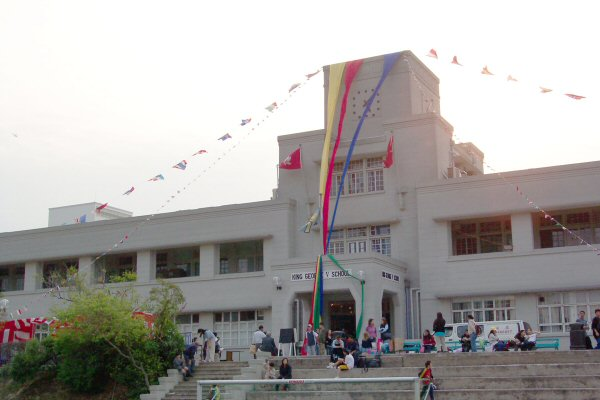
Donohue served as a mathematics senior teacher and principal at King George V School in Hong Kong from 1949 to 1951

Donohue was born on 3 September 1910 into an ordinary family in Doncaster, South Yorkshire, United Kingdom. In his early years, he was educated at Mexborough Secondary School (the predecessor of Mexborough Grammar School), and subsequently attended King's College London, majoring in general science. With his outstanding academic performance, he graduated with a first-class honors Bachelor of Science degree in 1936. Aspiring to become a teacher after graduating from university, he chose to pursue further studies at the Institute of Education, University of London, where he obtained a Diploma in Education.

In 1937, Donohue joined the colonial government of Trinidad in the British West Indies, working as a teacher at Queen's Royal College, the oldest secondary school in the area. Following the outbreak of World War II in 1939, he joined the Royal Air Force in 1941, participating in the war as a Flying Officer. He was demobilized from the Air Force after the end of World War II in 1946 and returned to teach at Queen's Royal College.

=== Education career in Hong Kong ===
In May 1949, Donohue was transferred to the British colony of Hong Kong in the Far East. He worked as a senior teacher teaching mathematics at King George V School in Kowloon, which was still a government school at the time (it became a subsidized school under the English Schools Foundation in 1979). Donohue was promoted to principal of the school in 1950, but was soon transferred back to the Education Department the following year due to an acting appointment as a Senior Inspector of Schools, and officially became a Senior Education Officer in April 1952. He acted as Assistant Director of Education (Administration) twice from April to November 1954 and from January to September 1955, before receiving official promotion in September 1955. During his tenure as Assistant Director of Education, he served as Hong Kong's representative to a UNESCO seminar in 1957 and the Commonwealth Education Conference in 1959. Additionally, he served as the president of the Hong Kong Amateur Athletic Association.

In December 1959, Donohue succeeded the retiring Mao Qin to serve as Deputy Director of Education. Shortly thereafter, in August 1960, he returned to Britain for a long leave and was scheduled to return to Hong Kong in March of the following year. However, in January 1961, the Hong Kong Government announced that Donohue would succeed the retiring Gao Shiya as Director of Education. Upon his return to Hong Kong, Donohue officially assumed the post of Director of Education on 29 April 1961. On 17 May, he concurrently became an official member of the Legislative Council of Hong Kong, and was later invited to serve as the honorary president of the Association of Private English Schools in June of the same year.

=== Director of Education of Hong Kong ===
==== Expanding the scale of education ====
Due to the influx of a large number of refugees fleeing to Hong Kong from mainland China after World War II, coupled with the post-war baby boom that further pushed up the number of school-age children, the shortage of school places became one of the primary educational issues for the post-war Hong Kong Government. In fact, as early as the 1950s, the Education Department of the Hong Kong Government had significantly expanded primary school places in accordance with the recommendations of the *Fisher Report*. However, because the government failed to correspondingly expand secondary school places significantly, the bottleneck between primary and secondary school became even more prominent entering the 1960s. Taking the 1960 academic year as an example, the number of primary school students in Hong Kong was 427,691, while the number of secondary school students was only 88,495, far lower than the former.

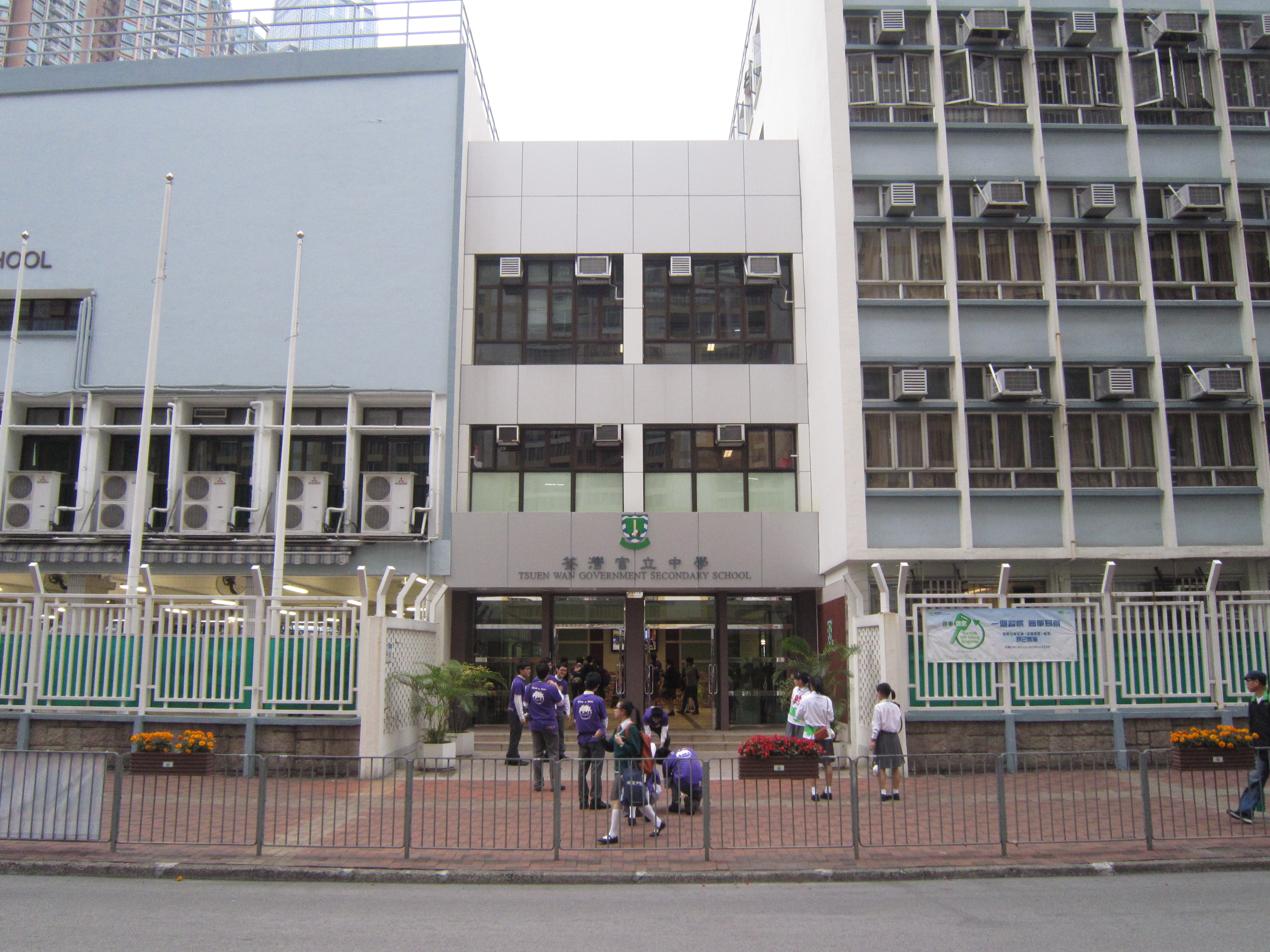
Tsuen Wan Government Secondary School, founded in 1961, was one of the schools completed during Donohue's tenure as Director of Education

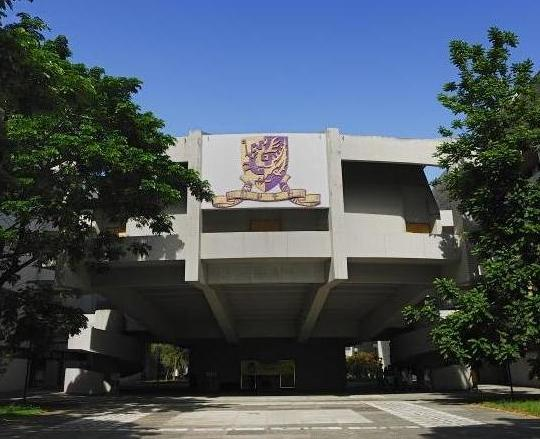
Donohue participated in the planning and establishment of The Chinese University of Hong Kong, which was founded in 1963, in his capacity as Director of Education

In view of this, Donohue actively expanded primary and secondary education during his tenure, and increased the Hong Kong Government's main educational expenditure from HK$122 million in 1961 to HK$190 million in 1964. The number of various schools in Hong Kong increased from 1,918 in 1961 to 2,227 in 1964. A total of 269 new government, aided, subsidized, and private primary and secondary schools were established during this period, including examples such as Tsuen Wan Government Secondary School in Tsuen Wan and Bishop Hall Jubilee School in Kowloon City. During the same period, the total number of students in Hong Kong grew from 658,618 to 854,279, an increase of nearly 200,000 in three years; the number of teachers in Hong Kong also rose from 21,152 to 29,155. Addressing the shortage of primary and secondary school places, the number of primary school students during Donohue's tenure grew from 484,536 to 596,971, and the number of secondary school students also grew significantly from 106,477 to 177,680. However, due to the continuous rise in the number of school-age children, combined with the fact that the government had not yet implemented free education, the problem of insufficient school places persisted.

Apart from primary and secondary education, Donohue paid special attention to the development of tertiary education in Hong Kong. During his tenure, the government's funding allocated to the University of Hong Kong increased year by year from HK$8.26 million in 1961 to HK$19.02 million in 1964. In September 1961, Donohue separated the branch of Grantham Training College into an independent institution and named the new school Sir Robert Black Training College (later known as Sir Robert Black College of Education). As the third teacher training college in Hong Kong, its independence made it another major institution for training teachers to cope with the rapid increase in the number of primary and secondary schools.

Donohue also participated in the planning and establishment of Hong Kong's second university. In 1961, Governor Sir Robert Black proposed to actively explore the opening of a "Chinese University" in Hong Kong, and established a University Preparation Committee in June of the same year for preliminary planning. The committee was chaired by Guan Zuyao (later Sir Cho-Yiu Kwan), who was then a non-official member of both the Executive and Legislative Councils, and Donohue was appointed as a member of the committee in his capacity as Director of Education. The following year, Black invited J. S. Fulton (later Lord Fulton), a senior British educational administrator, and others to Hong Kong to inspect the status of higher education. This resulted in a recommendation to merge three Chinese post-secondary colleges in Hong Kong (namely New Asia College, Chung Chi College, and United College) into a brand new Chinese University. After the recommendation was published in the *Fulton Report* in April 1963, the Hong Kong Government established a provisional council in June of the same year. Donohue and the then Secretary for Chinese Affairs, Mai Daoke, became the official representatives on the provisional council. In addition to providing assistance in preparing for the new school, they witnessed the official declaration of the establishment of The Chinese University of Hong Kong on 17 October of the same year.

Donohue supported the development of adult education and special education during his tenure. He supported the Department of Extra-Mural Studies of the University of Hong Kong in borrowing government school premises to run adult courses, and assisted in identifying suitable part-time lecturers to align with the government's policy on adult education. In terms of special education, the number of students in special schools across Hong Kong during his tenure gradually increased from 691 in 1961 to 1,091, enabling more children and adolescents with special needs to receive appropriate education. Donohue also attended overseas education conferences multiple times to maintain contact and exchange ideas with educational authorities around the world. These visits included attending the Commonwealth Education Conference held in New Delhi, India, in January 1962, and the annual meeting of Commonwealth Education Advisers held in Singapore in October of the same year.

Furthermore, in order to systematically integrate various school curricula, Donohue introduced a number of educational reforms targeting primary and secondary schools. One of the more significant changes was the announcement in July 1961 that the curriculum of Chinese middle schools would be shortened from the original six-year system to a five-year system to align it with that of English secondary schools. In response to this change, the Hong Kong School Certificate Examination, which was originally taken by English secondary school students, was renamed the Hong Kong English School Certificate Examination (HKESCE) in the same year and implemented from 1962, while Chinese middle school students could continue to take the original Hong Kong Chinese School Certificate Examination (HKCSCE). Donohue's change to the Chinese middle school system directly led to a situation in 1965 where students under both the new and old systems completed their secondary school curriculum simultaneously; the new system also prompted the Education Department to further reorganize the original Hong Kong Chinese School Certificate Examination into the Hong Kong Chinese Secondary School Certificate Examination (also abbreviated as HKCSCE) in 1965, running parallel to the Hong Kong English School Certificate Examination.

==== Modern school scheme ====
However, not every educational reform introduced by Donohue was welcomed; some reforms caused considerable backlash and resulted in failure. Among them, the establishment of modern schools (实用中学) drew much criticism from public opinion. Modern schools had begun to be implemented as early as 1960 before he became Director of Education. This type of secondary school was modeled on the secondary modern schools established by the British Parliament through the enactment of the *Education Act 1944*, aiming to provide students with an alternative choice outside of traditional grammar schools. Distinct from grammar schools that focused on teaching academic subjects, modern schools provided more practical curricula tailored to social needs, thereby preparing students and giving them the necessary skills before entering society, enabling them to adapt to Hong Kong's post-war industrialized society. Donohue strongly supported this concept and opened many modern schools during his tenure, including examples such as Fuk Wah Street Modern School, which officially moved into its new premises in 1961, and Jockey Club Modern School (predecessor of Jockey Club Government Secondary School) and Tsuen Wan Government Modern School (predecessor of Tsuen Wan Government Secondary Technical School), both officially opened in the same year. By 1963, the number of students enrolled in modern schools across Hong Kong reached as many as 3,918.

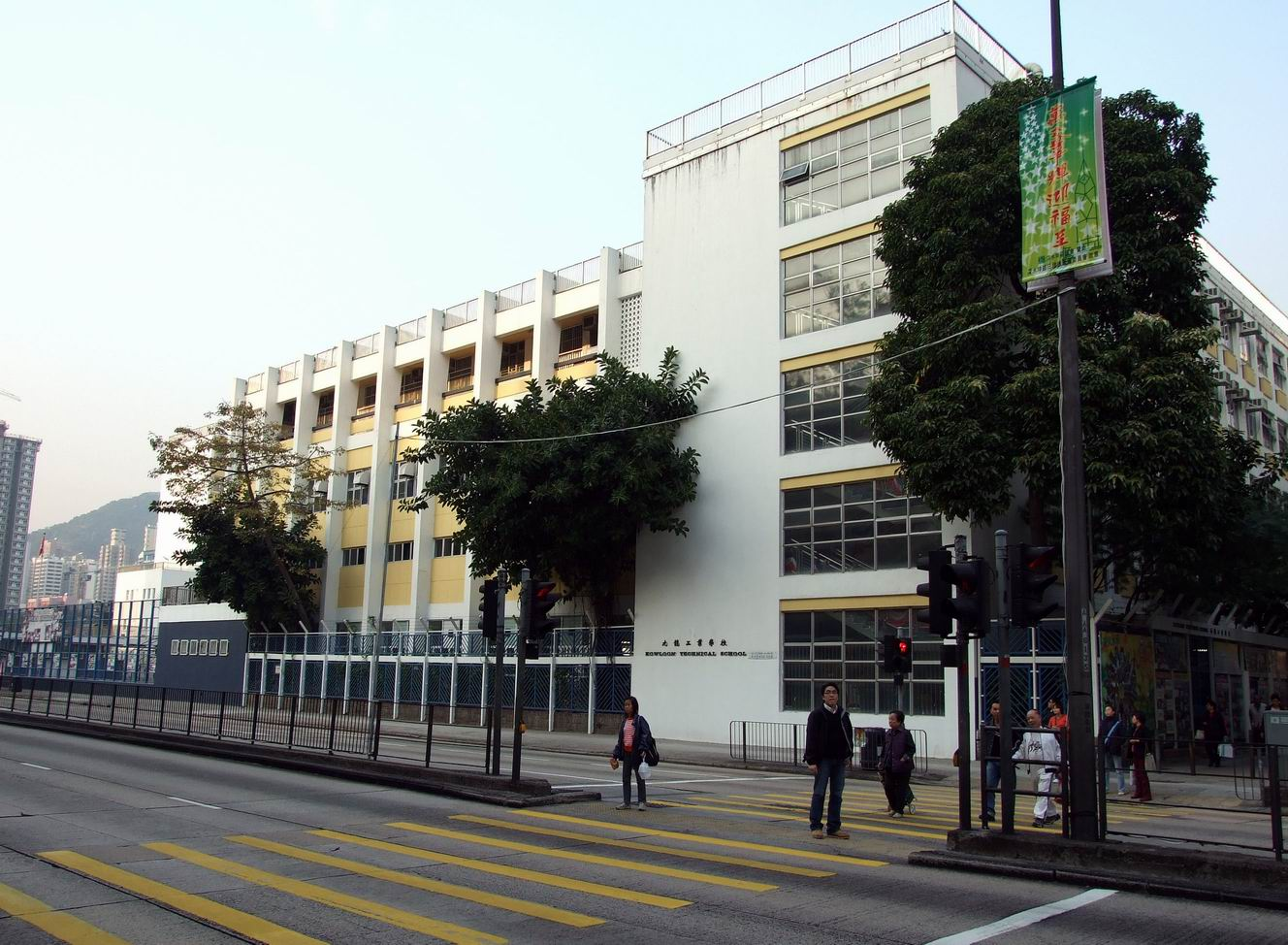
Fuk Wah Street Modern School was merged into Kowloon Technical School (pictured), a technical school, in 1964

However, just like the secondary modern schools in Britain, modern schools received less funding than traditional grammar schools, and their curriculum targeted secondary school students who could not adapt to mainstream grammar schools. Consequently, modern schools did not gain widespread social acceptance from the very beginning. Moreover, because the Chinese name of these schools emphasized "practicality" (实用), many parents believed that these schools deviated from the mainstream school principle of focusing on academic disciplines, thereby labeling modern schools as inferior to traditional secondary schools. Feng Bingfen, a non-official member of the Legislative Council, also pointed out in council meetings that secondary technical schools were more aligned with societal needs than modern schools, and criticized modern schools for cultivating students who were "...being neither here nor there", making them unpopular in the Chinese community.

As a result, shortly after Donohue stepped down and returned to Britain in early 1964, the modern school scheme was halted under multi-faceted backlash. Some modern schools, such as Jockey Club Modern School and Tsuen Wan Government Modern School, were reorganized into technical schools, while other modern schools merged with different institutions; among them, Fuk Wah Street Modern School was merged into Kowloon Technical School. Although the concept of modern schools came to naught, some technical schools established during the same period (such as Kowloon Technical School) were retained and later developed into another major category of secondary schools outside the traditional mainstream grammar schools.

==== The "Donohue Scheme" ====
Another educational reform controversy caused by Donohue was the "Reorganization of Primary and Secondary Education" scheme he introduced in 1962. As the entire plan was proposed by Donohue, it was nicknamed the "Donohue Scheme" by the public. The scheme primarily had three key focuses: first, starting from the new academic year in September 1963, the entry age for government and subsidized primary schools would be delayed from 6 to 7 years old; second, at the same time, the system of these primary schools would be reorganized from the original six-year curriculum to a five-year curriculum; third, a one-year special secondary school curriculum would be introduced in the future to provide a pathway for primary school graduates who failed to advance to five-year mainstream secondary schools, and this one-year special secondary school curriculum would be extended to a two-year special curriculum when appropriate.

According to Donohue's proposal, children would enter five-year primary schools at the age of 7 and then receive a two-year special secondary school curriculum, graduating from secondary school at the age of 14 at the earliest. At that time, the minimum legal working age defined under Hong Kong's labor laws happened to be 14 as well, meaning that the new primary and secondary school system could align with labor legislation. Donohue hoped that the scheme could serve as a means to expand the scale of primary and secondary schools, allowing more adolescents and children to receive appropriate education, and ameliorate the problem of illegal child labor caused by adolescents leaving school too early at the time.

However, the "Donohue Scheme" encountered great resistance from the very beginning. When the plan was announced in 1962, the Grant Schools Council already had reservations. Although general parents and school-running organizations initially affirmed the concept of the plan, that support quickly turned into doubt and opposition. Among them, many opinions in society expressed anxiety over children delaying their school entry by a year, and worried that a primary school curriculum of only five years would affect students' learning effectiveness. Many schools, parents, and students felt at a loss regarding the different entry ages and different systems, considering the new system more chaotic than the original one. Feng Bingfen, a non-official member of the Legislative Council, also criticized that the original six-year primary school curriculum was already quite tight, and shortening the curriculum by another year would further impact students' learning. Furthermore, given that children in Britain themselves received primary education from the age of 5, it was truly unsuitable for Hong Kong children to delay their primary education by another year to the age of 7.

In the face of external opposition, Donohue emphasized that according to the advice of educational experts, children aged 5 to 6 were still experiencing rapid physical and mental development, so it was inappropriate to receive formal primary education too early. He also stated that the reorganized five-year primary school curriculum by the Education Department was a brand new curriculum that had undergone comprehensive restructuring, differing from the previous six-year curriculum, thereby ensuring that the new system would not affect students' learning. Regarding the observation that British children received primary education from the age of 5, he explained that mainstream primary schools in Britain adopted a "play-way method" of teaching before the age of 7, and only switched to formal education afterward, so the situations in the two places could not be compared in the same breath. Despite considerable backlash, the plan was ultimately implemented as scheduled in the new academic year of September 1963 under Donohue's insistence.

In early 1963, the Hong Kong Government appointed R. M. Marsh, the County Education Officer of Hampshire, UK, and J. R. Sampson, the County Treasurer, to form the Marsh-Sampson Commission to conduct a comprehensive review of Hong Kong education. The commission visited Hong Kong for inspection from February to April 1963 and submitted its report to Governor Sir Robert Black in October of the same year. In January 1964, the Hong Kong Government made the report public and delivered it to the Legislative Council of Hong Kong for discussion. In the same month, the Governor announced the establishment of a Working Committee on the Educational Report to conduct in-depth research and review of the recommendations of the *Marsh-Sampson Report*. The report's working committee was chaired by Donohue, and its members included local gentry and businessmen Li Mingze, Deng Lvdunzhi, and educator Dr. Ma Yiying, among others. However, Donohue served as the chairman of the working committee for only about a month before his retirement and resignation in February 1964, so he was not deeply involved in the affairs of the working committee. The working committee did not complete and submit its report until January 1965, and shortly thereafter, the Hong Kong Government published the *White Paper on Education Policy* in April 1965 to summarize the recommendations of both reports.

A major focus of the *Marsh-Sampson Report*, the *Report of the Working Committee*, and the *White Paper on Education Policy* was their direct criticism of the "Donohue Scheme". Regarding the issues of the primary school system and entry age, the three documents uniformly mentioned the chaos caused by the new system, which included some children delaying their primary education until 7 years and 7 months old, and some parents being forced to enroll their children in more expensive private primary schools so that they could receive primary education at the age of 6. In terms of the special secondary school curriculum, all three documents pointed out that the special secondary school curriculum was not only unpopular but also had a small number of applicants, failing to make good use of public funds. They concluded that the Hong Kong Government had no need to universally raise the primary school entry age and shorten the duration of primary education just to allow a small group of people to receive special secondary education.

Both the *Marsh-Sampson Report* and the *Report of the Working Committee* supported the government's abolition of the special secondary school curriculum, but given that restoring the primary school entry age to 6 would involve significant institutional changes, neither report expressed a clear stance. Nonetheless, with fingers pointing at the "Donohue Scheme" from all sides, the Hong Kong Government, after considering the actual situation at the time, still decided to completely overturn the scheme in the *White Paper on Education Policy* and introduced remedial measures. These measures included lowering the primary school entry age back to 6 in stages and gradually restoring the primary school system from five to six years. Additionally, special Secondary One was abolished from 1966, and the originally intended introduction of special Secondary Two was canceled. After years of turmoil, Hong Kong's primary and secondary school systems did not return to their original state prior to the launch of the "Donohue Scheme" until 1968, four years after Donohue stepped down.

=== Later life ===
Health problems were reported during Donohue's tenure as Director of Education. In October 1962, while embarking on an official visit to Sydney and Canberra, Australia, he suddenly fell seriously ill and was admitted to a hospital in Sydney for several weeks before being able to return to Hong Kong to resume his work. In November 1963, news broke that Donohue would retire early due to health reasons, and the post of Director of Education would be taken over by Jian Naijie, the former Permanent Secretary of the Ministry of Education in Kenya, meaning that Donohue could not personally continue to implement the plan to reorganize the primary and secondary school systems. At only 52 years old, Donohue officially stepped down from the post of Director of Education on 24 February 1964. At 4:45 PM the following afternoon, he boarded a ship to return to Britain. More than two hundred officials and gentry, including the then Dai Side, Wu Lide, Luo Liji, Jian Yueqiang and his wife, and Yan Chengkun, went to see him off.

Donohue led a low-profile retirement life after returning to Britain. On 25 November 1976, he passed away from illness in Douglas, the capital of the Isle of Man, at the age of 66. The news of his death did not reach Hong Kong until February of the following year.

== Personal life ==
Donohue was married. During his time living in Hong Kong, he was a member of the St. Andrew's Society, a Scottish community organization.

Appendix: Major Career History
- Joined the colonial government of Trinidad, serving as a mathematics teacher at Queen's Royal College (1937–1941); Joined the Royal Air Force as a Flying Officer to participate in World War II (1941–1946); Returned to teach at Queen's Royal College (1946–1949); Transferred to the Education Department of Hong Kong, serving as a senior mathematics teacher at King George V School (1949–1950); Principal of King George V School (1951); Transferred back to the Education Department to act as Senior Inspector of Schools (1951 – April 1952); Senior Education Officer (April 1952 – April 1954 and December 1954); Acting Assistant Director of Education (Administration) (April–November 1954 and January–September 1955); Assistant Director of Education (Administration) (September 1955 – December 1959); Deputy Director of Education (December 1959 – April 1961); Director of Education (29 April 1961 – 24 February 1964); Official Member of the Legislative Council (17 May 1961 – 24 February 1964); Member of the Preparation Committee for The Chinese University of Hong Kong (June 1961 – June 1963); Council Member of the Provisional Council of The Chinese University of Hong Kong (June–October 1963)

== Honors ==
- Official Justice of the Peace (J.P.)

== See also ==
- History of education in Hong Kong
- Hong Kong Certificate of Education Examination
- Child labor

== Footnotes ==
Government offices
| Preceded by Mao Qin | Deputy Director of Education; December 1959 – April 1961 | Succeeded by Yan Jinuo |
| Preceded by Gao Shiya | Director of Education; April 1961 – February 1964 | Succeeded by Jian Naijie |
