= Keith Donohue =

Keith Donohue may refer to:

- Keith Donohue (novelist) (born 1960), American novelist
- Keith Donohue (cricketer) (born 1963), English cricketer
