= Justice Donahue =

Justice Donahue may refer to:

- Charles Donahue (judge) (1877–1952), associate justice of the Massachusetts Supreme Judicial Court
- Maurice H. Donahue (1864–1928), associate justice of the Supreme Court of Ohio
