= Peter Donohoe =

Peter Donohoe may refer to:

- Peter Donohoe (bobsleigh) (born 1964), Irish Olympic bobsledder
- Peter Donohoe (Gaelic footballer) (died 2004), former Gaelic football player for Cavan
- Peter Donohoe (pianist) (born 1953), English pianist

== See also ==
- Peter Donahue (disambiguation)
