= William J. Donohue =

American politician

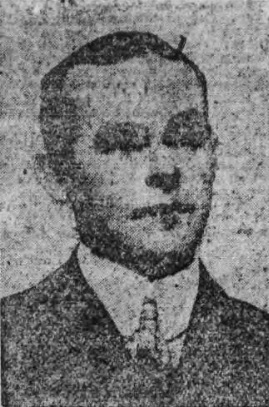
William J. Donohue (1906)

William J. Donohue (c. 1873 – January 31, 1907) was an American politician from New York.

== Life ==
Donohue was born about 1873, and lived with a wife and two children at 132 Bedford Avenue in Williamsburg, Brooklyn. He was a friend of the local Democratic boss Patrick H. McCarren.

In November 1905, Donohue ran on the Municipal Ownership League ticket for the New York State Assembly, but was defeated. In November 1906, he ran again, this time on the Democratic ticket, and was elected. He was a member of the New York State Assembly (Kings Co., 14th D.) in 1907.

One month into his term, on January 31, 1907, he killed himself by a self-inflicted gunshot to the head in Edward Lingers's saloon at 419 Oakland Street in Brooklyn.

== Sources ==
New York State Assembly
Preceded by George W. Kavanagh	New York State Assembly; Kings County, 14th District; 1907	Succeeded by James E. Fay
