= John O'Donoghue (1990s pitcher) =

American baseball player (born 1969)

- Pitcher
- Born: May 26, 1969 (age 56); Wilmington, Delaware, U.S.
- Batted: Left Threw: Left

MLB debut
- June 27, 1993, for the Baltimore Orioles

Last MLB appearance
- October 3, 1993, for the Baltimore Orioles

MLB statistics
- Win–loss record: 0–1
- Earned run average: 4.58
- Strikeouts: 16
- Stats at Baseball Reference

Teams
- Baltimore Orioles (1993)

John Preston O'Donoghue (born May 26, 1969) is a former Major League Baseball (MLB) pitcher. The 6'6", 198 lb. left-hander was signed by the Baltimore Orioles as an amateur free agent on June 28, 1990, and played for the Orioles in 1993.

O'Donoghue made his major league debut on June 27, 1993 at Oriole Park at Camden Yards. He was the starting pitcher that day against the New York Yankees and he gave up 6 earned runs in 6.2 innings, including home runs by Mike Stanley, Jim Leyritz, and Bernie Williams, as Baltimore lost 9-5. His next 10 appearances were as a relief pitcher, giving up just 4 earned runs in 13 innings.

Season and career totals include 11 games pitched, a 0-1 record, 3 games finished, 16 strikeouts and 10 walks in 19.2 innings pitched, and an earned run average of 4.58. O'Donoghue was traded to the Los Angeles Dodgers on December 19, 1994 but never again reached the big league level.

O'Donoghue is the son of former major league pitcher John Eugene O'Donoghue.

== See also ==
- List of second-generation Major League Baseball players
