= List of Irish royal consorts =

There have been no Gaelic queens of all Ireland since the late 12th century, following the complex sequence of the Norman invasion of Ireland, Treaty of Windsor (1175), and death of the last true High King of Ireland, Rory O'Connor, in 1198. However, there were many provincial Gaelic queens in subsequent centuries until the final Tudor conquest in 1603. Between 1171 and 1541, the kings of England claimed the title lord of Ireland. The Crown of Ireland Act 1542 declared Henry VIII of England and his successors to be kings of Ireland.

== Queens of Ireland ==
=== Semi-historical queens ===
Queen	Husband's Reign	Spouse	Remarks
Brigid ingen Cobthaig	564–566	Ainmuire mac Sétnai	Daughter of Cobthaig of the Uí Cheinnselaig. She was the mother of Cobthaig.
Eithne	595–600	Áed Sláine	She may have been mother to Áed's recorded children: at least six sons, including Diarmait and Blathmac, and a daughter named Rontud.
Findelb ingen Chellaig	665–669	Sechnassach	Probably daughter of Cellach Cualann, king of Leinster (died 715) of the Uí Máil. She was probably the mother of Bé Fáil, Murgal and Mumain, all being daughters.
Muirenn ingen Cellaig	694–701	Loingsech mac Óengusso	Daughter of Cellach Cualann, king of Leinster (died 715) of the Uí Máil. She was the mother of Flaithbertach, was later High King, and Fergal.
? ingen Congal Cendmagair	709–718	Fergal mac Máele Dúin	Daughter of Congal Cennmagair, High King of Ireland (died 710) of the Cenél Conaill. According to Fáistine Fergaile meic Máele Dúin ("Fergal mac Máele Dúin's Prophecy") to have been an illicit union; she was mother of Áed Allán.
?	709–718	Fergal mac Máele Dúin	Of the Ciannachta. According to Fáistine Fergaile meic Máele Dúin ("Fergal mac Máele Dúin's Prophecy"), she was mother of Niall Frossach.
Ailbíne ingen Ailello	739–758	Domnall Midi	Daughter of Ailello of Ard Ciannacht, a minor kingdom of the coast north of the River Boyne. Only recorded wife of Domnall Midi.
Dunlaith ingen Flaithbertaich	759–765	Niall Frossach	Daughter of Flaithbertach mac Loingsig, High King of Ireland (died 765) of the Cenél Conaill. She was mother of Áed Oirdnide, and died in 798.
Bé Fáil ingen Cathail	766–792	Donnchad Midi	Daughter of Cathal mac Muiredaig, eponym of the Leth Cathail in Ulster. She was mother of Óengus and Máel Ruanaid, and her death in 801 is recorded in the Annals of Ulster: "Be Fáil daughter of Cathal, Donnchad's queen, died.".
Euginis ingen Donnchada	793–817	Áed Oirdnide	Daughter of Donnchad Midi, High King of Ireland (died 797) of the Clann Cholmáin. She died in 802.
Maedhbh ingen Indrechtach	793–817	Áed Oirdnide	Daughter of Indrechtach mac Muiredaig, King of Connacht (died 723) of the Uí Briúin. Also known simply as Medb. According to the 12th century Banshenchas (Lore of Women), she was mother of Niall Caille, and died in 798.
Gormflaith ingen Donnchada	823–846	Niall Caille	Daughter of Donnchad Midi, High King of Ireland (died 797) of the Clann Cholmáin. She was mother of Áed Findliath, and died in 861 and the notice of her death in the Annals of Ulster calls her "a most charming queen of the Irish".

=== Historical queens ===
Queen	Husband's Reign	Spouse	Remarks
Gormlaith Rapach ingen Muiredach	855–879	Áed Findliath	Daughter of Muiredach mac Eochada, King of Ulster (died 839) of the Dal Fiatach. Known as "the Harsh". According to the 12th century Banshenchas (Lore of Women), she was mother of Domnall mac Áeda and Eithne ingen Áeda.
Land ingen Dúnlainge	855–879	Áed Findliath	Daughter of Dúngal mac Fergaile, King of Osraige (died 842) and sister of Cerball mac Dúnlainge. She was widow of High King Máel Sechnaill. According to the 12th century Banshenchas (Lore of Women), she was mother of Domnall mac Áeda and Eithne ingen Áeda. She died in 842.
Máel Muire ingen Cináeda	855–879	Áed Findliath	Daughter of Cináed mac Ailpín, King of the Picts (died 858) of the House of Alpin. She was mother of Niall Glúndub by her first marriage. According to Annals of Ulster, she died in 913. She remarried after her husband's death.
Gormlaith ingen Flainn	879–916	Flann Sinna	Daughter of Flann mac Conaing, King of Brega (died 868) of the Síl nÁedo Sláine. She was mother of Donnchad Donn.
Eithne ingen Áeda	879–916	Flann Sinna	Daughter of Áed Findliath, High King of Ireland (died 879) of the Cenél nEógain. She was mother of Máel Ruanaid. She was also married to Flannácan, King of Brega, by whom she had a son named Máel Mithig, although whether this preceded her marriage to Flann is unclear. It is likely that Flann divorced Eithne in order to follow the tradition of marrying his predecessor's widow, Eithne's stepmother. Eithne died as a nun in 917.
Máel Muire ingen Cináeda	879–916	Flann Sinna	Daughter of Cináed mac Ailpín, King of the Picts (died 858) of the House of Alpin. She was mother of Domnall mac Flainn, King of Brega, and Lígach ingen Flainn (died 923). According to Annals of Ulster, she died in 913.
Gormlaith ingen Flainn	916–919	Niall Glúndub	Daughter of Flann Sinna, High King of Ireland (died 879) of the Clann Cholmáin. Was the widow of Cerball mac Muirecáin, the King of Leinster and before that Cormac mac Cuilennáin, the King of Munster. Legend depicted her as a tragic figure; she was resorted to begging from door to door after Niall's death. She was mother of Muirchertach mac Néill. The Annals of Ulster record her death in 948.
Cainnech ingen Canannáin	919–944	Donnchad Donn	Daughter of Canannán mac Flaithbertach, King of the Cenél Conaill of Tír Connaill. She died in 929.
Órlaith íngen Cennétig	919–944	Donnchad Donn	Daughter of Cennétig mac Lorcáin, King of the Dál gCais of Thomond. She was killed in 941, apparently on Donnchad's order, perhaps due to a sexual relationship between her and her stepson Óengus.
Dublemna ingen Tigernán	919–944	Donnchad Donn	Daughter of a Tigernán, a lord or king of Bréifne of the Ua Ruairc. She died in 943.
Gormflaith ingen Murchada	980–1002	Máel Sechnaill mac Domnaill	Daughter of Murchad mac Finn, king of Leinster, and also widow of Olaf Cuaran, the Viking king of Dublin and York. She remarried to Brian Boru.
Mór	1002–1014	Brian Boru	Daughter of Gilla Brigte Ua Maíl Muaid of the Cenél Fiachach. Mother of his successor Murchad mac Brian, who was slain with his father at the Battle of Clontarf.
Echrad	1002–1014	Brian Boru	Mother of his successor Tadc mac Briain.
Gormflaith ingen Murchada	1002–1014	Brian Boru	Daughter of Murchad mac Finn, king of Leinster. Widow of Olaf Cuaran, the Viking king of Dublin and York, and former wife of Máel Sechnaill. Mother of his successor Donnchad mac Brian, later King of Munster. She was said to be his true love, having mistakeningly challenged his authority one too many times, they divorced. Though she is said to be the cause of his death, she was also said to be the one to mourn him the most. She died in 1030.
Dub Choblaig	1002–1014	Brian Boru	Daughter of a king of Connacht. Mother of Cénnetig mac Briain (Kennedy).
Máel Muire ingen Amlaíb	1014–1022	Máel Sechnaill mac Domnaill (second reign)	Daughter of Amlaíb Cuarán of the Norse-Irish Uí Ímair, she is the first known Queen of Ireland of Norse descent. Máel Muire died in 1021, a year before her husband, to whom she may have been wed for over two decades. The Annals of Clonmacnoise actually style her Queen of Ireland.
Cacht ingen Ragnaill	died 1064 (with opposition)	Donnchad mac Briain	Possibly sister of Echmarcach mac Ragnaill, king of Dublin, also of the Uí Ímair. The marriage was in 1032. Cacht died in 1054, styled Queen of Ireland.
Derbforgaill ingen Donnchad	died 1072 (with opposition)	Diarmait mac Maíl na mBó	Daughter of Donnchad mac Briain, king of Munster of the Dál gCais.
Dubchoblaig of the Uí Cheinnselaig	died 1086 (with opposition)	Toirdelbach Ua Briain	Of the Uí Cheinnselaig. Mother of Diarmait Ua Briain, perhaps named for her kinsman and Toirdelbach's protector Diarmait mac Maíl na mBó. She died in 1088
Derbforgaill of Osraige	died 1086 (with opposition)	Toirdelbach Ua Briain	Mother of Tadc and Muirchertach.
Gormlaith of Ua Fógarta	died 1086 (with opposition)	Toirdelbach Ua Briain	Of the Ua Fógarta.
