= Muirchertach mac Néill =

Muirchertach mac Néill (died 26 February 943), called Muirchertach of the Leather Cloaks (Old Irish: Muirchertach na Cochall Craicinn), was a King of Ailech.

== Family ==
Muirchertach belonged to the Cenél nEógain sept of the northern Uí Néill. He was the son of Niall Glúndub and Gormlaith, thus his father and both of his grandfathers—Niall's father Áed Finnliath and Gormlaith's father Flann Sinna—had been High King of Ireland. Máel Muire ingen Cináeda (died 913), his father's mother, had after the death of Áed been married to Flann Sinna, and had borne him Domnall (died 921) and Liagnach (died 932). She was a daughter of king of the Picts, Cináed mac Ailpín. His wife was Dubhdara ingen Cellaig, daughter of Cellach mac Cerbaill and sister of Donnchad mac Cellaig, both kings of Osraige.

Melkorka Mýrkjartansdóttir, whose story is told in the Icelandic Laxdæla saga, claimed to be the daughter of Muirchertach. Melkorka was sold as a slave to the Icelandic chieftain Höskuldur Dala-Kollsson, with whom she had an illegitimate son named Ólafur “Pái” Höskuldsson. Ólafur became a successful chieftain in Iceland, and is one of the major characters of Laxdæla saga.

== Early life ==
Muirchertach's father was killed in battle against the Norse-Gaels of Ireland near Dublin on 14 September 919 along with many other Irish kings. Muirchertach's mother's brother, Donnchad Donn mac Flainn, became the new High King, while Muirchertach became King of Ailech.

== Career ==
Muirchertach married Donnchad's daughter Flann, but relations between the two men were not good. Conflict between them is recorded in 927, 929, and 938, but it was not until 941, following Flann's death the year previously, that Muirchertach and Donnchad came to blows. That year Muirchertach raided Mide, Osraige, and Munster, taking the Munster king Cellachán Caisil hostage as a demonstration of his power and Donnchad's limited authority. He is also said to have defeated a group of Norsemen at the Crown Mound near Newry in 924.

Muirchertach was a hardened warrior, and finally met his death in battle in 943 at the hands of Blácaire mac Gofrith, King of Dublin. His obituary in the Annals of Ulster calls him "the Hector of the western world", and the "heir designate of Ireland".

Muirchertach's son Domnall ua Néill was passed over for the succession on Donnchad Donn's death the year after Muirchertach's, but eventually became High King following the death of Donnchad's successor Congalach Cnogba in 956.

== Family tree ==
Flann Sinna; High King 879–916
Donnchad Donn; High King 919–944
Flann
Flaithbertach

Gormlaith
Gormlaith
Muirchertach; King of Ailech 938–943
Domnall; High King 956–980
O'Neill dynasty

Áed Findliath; High King 862–879	Máel Muire
Niall Glúndub; High King 916–919
Conaig
Domnall
Fergal; King of Ailech 980–989

Muirchertach mac Néill Cenél nEógain
Regnal titles
Preceded by Fergal mac Domnaill	King of Ailech; 938–943	Succeeded by Domnall ua Néill and Flaithbertach mac Muirchertaig meic Néill
