= Kingship of Tara =

List of Kings of Tara (sometimes also High Kings of Ireland)

The Kingship of Tara (/ˈtærə/) was a title of authority in ancient Ireland; the title is closely associated with the archaeological complex at the Hill of Tara. The position was considered to be of eminent authority in medieval Irish literature and Irish mythology, although national kingship was never a historical reality in early Ireland. The term also represented a prehistoric and mythical ideal of sacred kingship in Ireland. Holding the title King of Tara invested the incumbent with a powerful status. Many Irish High Kings were simultaneously Kings of Tara. The title emerged in the ninth and tenth centuries. In later times, actual claimants to this title used their position to promote themselves in status and fact to the High Kingship. Prior to this, various branches of the Uí Néill dynasty appear to have used it to denote overlordship of their kindred and realms. It was associated with Feis Temro (Feast of Tara), a pagan inauguration rite.

The titles King of Tara and High King of Ireland were distinct and unrelated for much of history.

The following is a list of those accorded the title (or at least believed to be seated) in the Irish annals—the kings and legends. The dates and names of the early kings are uncertain and are often highly suspect. Several may be doubles of others, while composite characters may be entirely fictitious. Some may also be assigned to the wrong prehistoric kindred.

== Legendary Kings of Tara ==
=== Prehistoric ===
- Mythological:
  - Eochu Feidlech
  - Eochu Airem
  - Lugaid Riab nDerg
  - Crimthann Nia Náir
  - Feradach Finnfechtnach
- Érainn and Dáirine (Corcu Loígde):
  - Eterscél Mór
  - Conaire Mór / Conaire Cóem
  - Dáire Doimthech
  - Mac Coen / Lugaid Loígde
  - Eochaid Étgudach
- Laigin:
  - Úgaine Mór
  - Lóegaire Lorc
  - Cobthach Cóel Breg
  - Labraid Loingsech
  - Cairbre Nia Fer
  - Nuadu Necht
  - Cathair Mór
- Dál Cuinn (Connachta and Uí Néill):
  - (Fíachu Finnolaech)
  - Tuathal Techtmar
  - Fedlimid Rechtmar
  - Conn of the Hundred Battles
  - Art mac Cuinn
  - Cormac mac Airt
  - Cairbre Lifechair

=== Late Prehistoric ===
- Niall of the Nine Hostages
- Lóegaire mac Néill
- Coirpre mac Néill
- Ailill Molt

=== Early Historic Kings of Tara ===
- Mac Cairthinn mac Coelboth, died 546/547
- Tuathal Maelgarb, d.544/549
- Diarmait mac Cerbaill, before 558 – 565
- Forggus mac Muirchertaig and Domnall mac Muirchertaig, 565–569?
- Báetán mac Muirchertaig and Eochaid mac Domnaill, 569? – 572/573
- Ainmuire mac Sétnai, 572/573 – 575/576
- Áed mac Ainmuirech, 575/576, or 592 – 598
- Fiachnae mac Báetáin (Fiachnae Lurgan), 589–626
- Colmán Rímid mac Báetáin and Áed Sláine mac Diarmato, 598–604
- Áed Allán mac Domnaill (Áed Uaridnach), "king of Temair", 604–?
- Congal Cáech, died 637

=== Later Kings of Tara ===
- Cathal mac Finguine, 713–742
- Áed Allán, 730–738
- Donnchad Midi mac Murchado, 763–797
- Áed Oirdnide mac Néill, 797–819
- Conchobar mac Donnchada, 819–833
- Niall Caille mac Áeda, 833–846
- Máel Sechnaill mac Máele Ruanaid, 846–862
- Áed Findliath mac Néill, 862–879
- Flann Sinna mac Máelschnaill, 878–916
- Niall Glaúndub, 916–919
- Donnchad Domnaill mac Flainn, 919–944
- Ruaidrí Ua Canannáin, 944 – 30 November 950
- Congalach Cnogbach mac Máelmithig, 950–956
- Domnall ua Néill, 956–980
- Máel Sechnaill mac Domnaill, 980–1002

== Baile Chuinn Chétchathaig ==
Baile Chuinn Chétchathaig is an Old Irish list of Kings of Tara or High Kings of Ireland which survives in two 16th-century manuscripts.

== Togail Bruidne Dá Derga ==
Togail Bruidne Dá Derg is an Irish tale belonging to the Ulster Cycle of Irish mythology.

== See also ==
- Irish kings
- High King of Ireland
- List of High Kings of Ireland
- Cín Dromma Snechtai
