= Flaithbertach Ua Néill =

Flaithbertach Ua Néill (before 978–1036) was king of Ailech, a kingdom of north-west Ireland. He abdicated in 1030 and undertook a pilgrimage to Rome, for which reason he was known as Flaithbertach an Trostáin (Flaithbertach of the Pilgrim's staff). Following the death of his son Áed in 1033, Flaithbertach left his retirement and resumed the leadership of the Northern Uí Néill.

== Background ==
Flaithbertach, a grandson of Domnall ua Néill, belonged to the northern Cenél nEógain branch of the Northern Uí Néill. The later O'Neill (Irish Ua Néill) kindred, kings of Tír Eógain and later earls of Tyrone, descended from Flaithbertach's branch of Cenél nEógain, and were named for his great-great-grandfather Niall Glúndub. The rival Meic Lochlainn branch of Cenél nEógain, which would be important in the generations after Flaithbertach's lifetime probably descended from Niall Glúndub's brother Domnall mac Áeda. Most of the province of Ulster, from the River Bann in the east to the River Foyle in the west, was ruled by Cenél nEógain and their many clients, of whom the Airgíalla were the most important. Their own lands included much of modern County Londonderry and County Tyrone, which bears their name, extending from Lough Neagh to Lough Foyle and northwards to Inishowen. To the east lay the kingdom of Ulster, reduced to little more than modern County Down and southern County Antrim; to the west, Tír Conaill (modern County Donegal) was divided among the branches of another Uí Néill kindred, Cenél Conaill; and to the south the kingdom of Breifne and the kingdom of Mide.

The Cenél nEógain kings of Ailech were based originally in Inishowen. By the 9th century, however, Cenél nEógain power had extended eastwards, into lands which had once belonged to the kingdom of Ulster and the Airgíalla, and kings were inaugurated at Tulach Óg (Tullyhogue Fort, County Tyrone) and buried at Armagh. While not directly under the control of the kings of Ailech, Armagh was subject to their influence and it is recorded that the kings kept a house there. Although the Ecclesiastical Province of Armagh was divided at Synod of Kells-Mellifont in 1152, its authority over the churches of the north and centre of Ireland in Flaithbertach's time was much greater, as shown by the earlier boundaries between provinces established at the Synod of Ráith Bressail in 1111, which divided Ireland between Armagh and Cashel. Armagh was not only Saint Patrick's city, it was also in some measure the city of Cenél nEógain. Other major churches in the region, those established as sees following the 12th-century reforms, included the Columban churches of Derry and Raphoe, and the Patrician churches of Louth, Maghera and Connor.

== Before Clontarf ==
The date of Flaithbertach's birth is not certainly known, but his father Muirchertach was killed in 977 by Amlaíb Cuarán. A late addition to the Annals of Ulster claims that Flaithbertach was born that same year. His mother was Cres Cumal of the Uí Maine. His grandfather Domnall ua Néill, High King of Ireland, died in 980, and the kingship of Ailech passed first to Fergal mac Domnaill meic Conaing, who perhaps abdicated in 989 and died in 1001. Fergal was followed, perhaps after an interval of some years, by Flaithbertach's uncle Áed mac Domnaill, who is said to have been but 29 years of age and in the 10th year of his reign at his death in 1004.

The first report of Flaithbertach is in 1005 when he led a raid on Leth Cathail, part of the kingdom of Ulster, where the king of Leth Cathail, Áed mac Tommaltaig, was killed. Flaithbertach raided Leth Cathail again in 1007, killing Áed's successor Cú Ulad, and undermining the settlement imposed in 1005 when Brian Bóruma came to Armagh with a great army and received Flaithbertach's submission. Brian returned in 1006 and again in 1007, on which occasion he removed some of the hostages Flaithbertach had obtained from Ulster into his own keeping, by force according to the Annals of Innisfallen. Perhaps at about this time Flaithbertach married Brian's daughter Bé Binn; their children included Áed and Domnall.

Flaithbertach continued to act aggressively towards his neighbours. He had a king of Cenél Conaill blinded and put to death in 1009, and raided the midlands as far as the lower reaches of the River Boyne later in the year. These actions brought Brian back north in 1010, again receiving Flaithbertach's submission and taking hostages from Cenél nEógain back home to Kincora. Cenél Conaill was invaded in 1011, this time Flaithbertach acting as Brian's ally, his army accompanying those of Brian's sons Domnall and Murchad. A second expedition by Brian himself late in the year received the submission of Cenél Conaill. Flaithbertach, however, had returned to his old ways and again attacked Ulster, capturing Dún Echdach (Duneight, south of Lisburn) and receiving the submission of the Ulster over-king Niall mac Duib Tuinne. He attacked Ulster and Cenél Conaill again in 1012.

In 1013 Flaithbertach raided into the kingdom of Mide, ruled by former High King Máel Sechnaill mac Domnaill. The two armies met near Kells, but Máel Sechnaill withdrew his army without fighting. This seemingly minor event appears to have led Máel Sechnaill's neighbours to believe him weak and vulnerable, and a war with Leinster and Dublin followed. The war ended at the battle of Clontarf on 23 April 1014, where Brian Bóruma was killed, although his armies and Máel Sechnaill's defeated the Leinstermen and Dubliners.

== After Clontarf ==
With Brian dead, Máel Sechnaill and Flaithbertach embarked on a series of campaigns which reestablished Máel Sechnaill as High King. According to the Cogadh Gaedhel re Gallaibh, a work of propaganda composed in the time of Brian's great-grandson Muirchertach, in 1002, shortly before Brian replaced Máel Sechnaill as High King, Máel Sechnaill had offered to resign the High Kingship in favour of Áed mac Domnaill, Flaithbertach's uncle and predecessor as king of Ailech in return for aid against Brian. The Cogadh states that Áed refused and that no help came to Máel Sechnaill from Cenél nEógain and the north, only from Connacht. What caused Flaithbertach to support Máel Sechnaill where his uncle had not is unknown.

Máel Sechnaill died in 1022. Flaithbertach campaigned in the midlands in 1025 and received the submission of Dublin, but Donnchad mac Briain did likewise in 1026, and Flaithbertach also that same year. But Dublin appears to have been easy prey for Niall mac Eochada, the king of Ulster, also raided Dublin in 1026. That year Ulster was raided, and Cenél Conaill the next.

Flaithbertach was by this time over 50 years old. His son Domnall died in 1027 and in 1030 he went on pilgrimage to Rome, returning home in 1031. From this he obtained his byname, Flaithbertach an Trostáin, that is Flaithbertach of the Pilgrim's staff. That year Niall mac Eochada raided Telach Óg while Flaithbertach's son Áed undertook a raid in reprisal. Also in 1031 Flaithbertach and Áed raided the south part of Cenél Conaill.

At about this time Flaithbertach abdicated, being succeeded as king of Ailech by Áed, but Áed died on 30 November 1033. Flaithbertach left his retirement and became king again, the Annals of Innisfallen say: "Flaithbertach Ua Néill took Ailech again, and the north of Ireland submitted to him on account of seniority." However, it may be that it was not the death of Áed which led to Flaithbertach's recall as the southern Annals of Innisfallen place this event only after the death of Domnall Ua Maíl Doraid of Cenél Conaill. Flaithbertach's second reign was seemingly uneventful. He died in 1036 as king of Ailech.

Flaithbertach is not included in modern lists of High Kings. Nonetheless, some medieval writers identified him with a king included in the list of High Kings in Baile in Scáil, and it may be that he is included in the verse history of Irish and Scottish kings in prophetic style called the Prophecy of Berchán. Both of these sources are problematic and neither is generally relied upon for Irish king lists, unlike the much earlier Baile Chuind, on which they are modelled. Perhaps most conclusively, the historical poems of Flaithbertach's contemporary Flann Mainistrech and the compilers of the pro-Uí Néill chronicles at Armagh do not recognise him as a High King.

Following Flaithbertach's death, his descendants were eclipsed by their Meic Lochlainn cousins. The last of the family was recorded in the annals in the 1080s, after which they disappear. Because of this, several Irish academics such as Francis John Byrne believe the true O'Neill descendants of Niall Glundubh no longer held any power anywhere in Ireland, and that their alleged 12th-century descendant, Áed in Macáem Tóinlesc was of unknown ancestry and only adopted the surname. Indeed, Áed was a puppet king installed by Ruaidrí Ua Conchobair who partitioned Cenél nEógain between the Meic Lochlainn and Áed in 1167. Most current bearers of the surname O'Neill claim Áed as their ancestor such as the Scottish Clan MacNeill.
