= Ruaidrí ua Canannáin =

Ruaidrí ua Canannáin (died 30 November 950) was king of the Cenél Conaill, and according to some sources, High King of Ireland.

The Cenél Conaill, a branch of the northern Uí Néill, had been excluded from the alternating succession to the High Kingship which had been largely dominated by the northern Cenél nEógain kings of Ailech and the southern Clann Cholmáin kings of Mide since the early the 8th century. Ruaidrí was a descendant in the seventh generation of the previous Cenél Conaill High King, Flaithbertach mac Loingsig.

In the period before Ruaidrí ua Canannáin rose to prominence, the Cenél nEógain heir apparent to the High Kingship, Muirchertach mac Néill, was killed in battle in 943, while the High King, Donnchad Donn of Clann Cholmáin, died the following year. The deaths of Muirchertach and Donnchad appear to have left the field open to less likely competitors. The Uí Néill king lists make Congalach Cnogba of the southern Síl nÁedo Sláine, a kin group long excluded from the succession, Donnchad's successor. Congalach was Donnchad's sister's son. However, Donnchad's apparent policy of making strategic marriages to rising families also made Ruaidrí his kinsman. His aunt, Cainnech ingen Canannáin (d. 929), had been Donnchad's first wife.

Ruaidrí, whose home base was in the south of modern Donegal, first comes to notice after the death of Muirchertach. In 943 he defeated the Cenél nEógain and the northmen of Lough Foyle, killing Máel Ruanaid mac Flainn, Muirchertach's cousin. With the loss of Máel Ruanaid after Muirchertach, the Cenél nEógain were eclipsed, leaving Ruaidrí as master of the north at Donnchad's death. Most sources make Congalach Cnogba High King in succession to Donnchad. Sources claiming that Ruaidrí assumed the High Kingship after Donnchad, either alone or jointly with Congalach, are: the Prophecy of Berchán, an 11th-century historical poem presented as a prophecy; the southern, anti-Uí Néill Annals of Innisfallen; and the 12th-century Cogad Gáedel re Gallaib (The War of the Irish with the Foreigners) a wildly successful work of propaganda authored on behalf of the descendants of Brian Bóruma. The form of the Prophecy of Berchán makes identifying the subjects, who are referred to by often obscure epithets rather than names, sometimes difficult. In the case of Ruaidrí ua Canannáin, the identification is obvious:

After that a king from the North takes sovereignty...; Red [ruad] will be the name of that king (rí), he puts Ireland into anxiety.

The record shows both men active in the midlands of Ireland. Men of Ruaidrí's were killed by Congalach and Amlaíb Cuarán, king of Dublin, in 945. In 947 Ruaidrí led an army to Slane in County Meath in 947, defeating Congalach and Amlaíb. The Cenél nEógain were again the target in 949 when Muirchertach's son Flaithbertach was killed. In 950 Ruaidrí ua Canannáin led an army into the midlands and campaigned there for six months. He defeated Congalach and his ally Gofraid mac Sitriuc, King of Dublin, and set up camp, probably somewhere between Donaghpatrick and Kells, from which he raided Brega and Meath. According to the Annals of Ulster, his army defeated an attack by the foreigners of Dublin on his camp on 30 November 950, but Ruaidrí himself was killed in the fight along with his son Niall. At his death he is called "heir designate of Ireland" by the Annals of Ulster, the same title as was used of Muirchertach at his death in 943. The Prophecy of Berchán, apparently following a different tradition, has Ruaidrí killed by a Leinsterman.

Ruaidrí's reign was the high point of Ua Canannáin power. In the years following his death various of his kinsmen were killed by Congalach and Cenél nÉogain, and these deaths, together with the rising power of their Ua Máel Doraid kinsmen largely excluded the Ua Canannáin even from the kingship of Cenél Conaill.

          O'Cannon 

Parent house:

Cenél Conaill / Uí Néill

County: Kingdom of Tyrconnell

Founded: 5th century

Founder: Conall Gulban

Current head: Aaron Patrick Cannon

Heir apparent: Kingship of Tyrconnell and the Throne of Tara

Final ruler: Rory Ó Cannon, King of Tyrconnell (died 1250)

Titles: Cenél Conaill Kings of Tara High Kings of Ireland Kings of Tyrconnell

O'Cananain:

Kings of Tyrconnell
