= Gormflaith =

Gormfhlaith (Irish pronunciation: [ˈɡɔɾˠəmˠˌlˠa]; Old Irish: Gormflaith) is an Irish-language feminine given name derived from gorm "blue" and flaith "lady". It was one of the most popular Irish feminine given names between the 8th and 16th centuries, though, it has fallen out of common use. The name was traditionally considered equivalent to Barbara.

Gormfhlaith is also a Gaelic mythological personification of Ireland.

== People ==
=== Medieval era ===
- Gormflaith ingen Fhlaithnath, Abbess of Cluana Bronaigh, died 810
- Gormlaith Rapach, Queen of Ailech, died 840
- Gormflaith ingen Donncadha, Queen of Ailech, died 861
- Gormlaith ingen Flann mac Conaing, Queen of Tara, fl. 870
- Gormflaith ingen Flann Sinna, Queen of Tara, died 948
- Gormlaith ingen Murchada, Queen of Ireland, died 1030
- Gormflaith ingen Floind maic Mail Sechnaill, Princess of Mide, died 1046
- Gormflaith ingen Cathail, died 1063
- Gormflaith Ní Fócartai, died 1076
- Gormflaith Ní Chonchobuir Ciarraige, Princess of Kerry, died 1110
- Gormflaith ingen Murchadha maic Máil na m-Bó, Princess of Leinster, died 1112
- Gormflaith ingen Buadachain, died 1127/1134
- Gormflaith Ní Branan, died 1314
- Gormflaith Ní Diarmata, Princess of Moylurg, died 1324
- Gormflaith Ní Domnaill, died 1350
- Gormflaith Níc Uidir, Princess of Fermanagh, died 1352
- Gormflaith Bean Uí Dhomhnaill, Queen of Tír Chonaill, died 1416
- Gormflaith Bean Uí Ruairc, Queen of Breifne, died 1425
- Gormflaith Ní Seghannain, died 1432
- Gormflaith Ní Duibhgeannáin, died 1437
- Gormlaith Chaomhanach, Princess of Leinster, died 1465
- Gormflaith Bean Uí Suibhne, died 1468
- Gormflaith Ní Domnaill, Princess of Tír Chonaill, died 1524
- Gormflaith Ní Ruairc, Princess of Breifne, died 1585

=== Modern era ===
- Gormfhlaith Ní Thuairisg, broadcaster for Raidió na Gaeltachta

== See also ==
- List of Irish-language given names
