= Gormflaith ingen Flann Sinna =

- Queen consort of Tara; Queen consort of Munster; Queen consort of Leinster
- Born: c. 870
- Died: 948
- Spouse: Cormac mac Cuilennáin; Cerball mac Muirecáin; Niall Glúndub
- Issue: Muirchertach mac Néill
- House: Clann Cholmáin
- Father: Flann Sinna
- Mother: Gormlaith ingen Flann mac Conaing

Gormflaith ingen Flann Sinna (c. 870–948) was an Irish Queen of Tara, Munster, and Leinster.

== Family background ==
Gormflaith was the daughter of Flann Sinna, High King of Ireland from 879 to 916. Her mother was Gormlaith ingen Flann mac Conaing of Brega. Her known siblings were:

- Donnchad Donn, her full sibling.
- Óengus mac Flann Sinna, died 915.
- Máel Ruanaid mac Flann Sinna, killed in 901
- Donnell mac Flann Sinna, King of Mide 919–921.
- Lígach ingen Flann Sinna, died 923.
- Conchobar mac Flann Sinna, king of Mide 916–919.
- Áed mac Flann Sinna, blinded on Donnchad Donn's orders in 919.
- Cerball mac Flann Sinna
- Muirgel ingen Flann Sinna, died 928.

== Queen of Munster ==
Gormflaith was notable for having been the successive queen consort of Munster, Leinster and Tara.

Gormflaith was married first to King Cormac mac Cuilennáin of Munster, who had taken vows of celibacy as a bishop. The marriage was not said to be consummated. MacShamhran (p. 203) writes that "difficulties relating to this marriage leave it probable that it is a fiction – created when memory of Gormlaith became assimilated to the "sovereignty goddess" who had three husbands". However, recent work has criticised attempts to see influence from supernatural beliefs in the portrayals of Gormflaith.

== Queen of Leinster ==
Cormac was killed at the battle of Bealach Mugna in 908 by an alliance of Flann Sinna of Tara and Cerball mac Muirecáin, King of Leinster. Flann afterwards married Gormflaith to Cerball, who is alleged (according to a text in the Book of Leinster) to have abused her so much that she was forced to return to her father at least once.

== Political intrigue ==
MacShamhran writes (p. 203) "... the case for accepting as historical her marriage to Cerball is strengthened by a dindshenchas poem in the Book of Leinster, which also presents a different view of their relationship, implying that she was involved in intrigue on his behalf. She is blamed for the deaths of Cellach Carmain, who was an Ui Muirdaig dynast, and his wife Aillenn – apparently rivals of her husband. This circumstance, along with the fact that Cerball had the support of Flann Sinna at Belach Mugna, fits well with a Clan Cholmain-Ui Faelain alliance in the years prior to that battle."

Ó Cróinín (pp. 219), citing the poem Cell Chorbbáin (composed shortly after 909), writes: "It states quite categorically that Gormlaith was responsible for the death of Cellach of Carmun and his wife Aillend – 'she laid them in the church ground' (dos-fuc i talmain cilli) and by these actions 'she wrought terrible deeds' (do-ringni gnimu grana). This is clearly referring to a double-murder, and equally clearly, it is implicit that Gormlaith – and, by extension, her husband Cerball? – were involved together in a conspiracy to remove the reigning king of Leinster (here named as Cellach Carmun) and presumably replace him with Cerball." Ó Cróinín goes on to compare the data in the poem with that of Cóic ríg tríchat to show that "there is something wrong with the Ui Dunlainge succession at precisely this point. ... It looks very much as though the struggle for succession ... saw several of the Ui Muiredaig line eliminated in the first half of the ninth century, and their names were simply expunged from the record:"

== Queen of Tara ==
After Cerball's death in 909 Gormlaith married her stepbrother Niall Glúndub, who died in 919. By him she had Muirchertach mac Néill, ancestor to the O'Neill dynasty of the north of Ireland.

== After marriage ==
The Annals of Clonmacnoise have her becoming poverty-stricken after the death of Niall, reduced to wandering from place to place as a poet to survive. This literary tradition, which appears over a century after her death, may be based upon a misreading of her obit in the Annals of Ulster, which instead indicates she died in a convent.

== Poems ==
A number of poems of later date are ascribed to Gormflaith in Middle Irish sources, including laments for Cerball and Niall, but not for Cormac. L.M. McCraith, noting that "the charm of Gaelic verse depends for the most part on an elaborate system of repetition and alliteration, which no other language can reproduce", gives this translation of the poem "Gormlaith, the daughter of Flann, speaks to the Priest":

"Monk, remove thy foot!
Lift it from the grave of Nial.
Too long dost thou heap earth
On him with whom I fain would lie.

Too long dost thou, Monk, there
Heap earth on Noble Nial,
Thou brown-haired friend, though gentle,
Press not with thy sole the earth!

Do not too firmly close the grave
O Priest, whose office is so sad.
Rise off the fair, the dark-knee’d Nial,
Monk! Remove thy foot!

O Mac Nial of finest gold
'Tis not my will that thou are bound [i.e. in grave-clothes],
Leave – Ah! leave his stone and grave.
Monk! Remove thy foot!

I am Gormley, regent queen.
Daughter I of Flann the Bold!
Stand not thou upon the grave.
Monk! Remove thy foot!”

== Family tree ==
    Gormlaith ingen Flann mac Conaing = Flann Sinna =
                                      |             |
    __________________________________|             |_________________________________________________________________
   |                                  |             |            |         |        |      |       |        |       |
   |                                  |             |            |         |        |      |       |        |       |
   Gormflaith, d. 948.  Donnchad Donn Cerball Máel Ruanaid Óengus Áed Conchobar Donnell Lígach Muirgel
   =Niall Glúndub                     |
   |                                  |
   |                                  |
   Muirchertach mac Néill Donnall, King of Tara
   |                                  |
   |                                  |
   Domnall ua Neill Máel Sechnaill mac Domnaill
   |                                  |
   |                                  |
   O'Neill dynasty Ua Mael Sechlainn

== See also ==
- Gormflaith (Irish name)
