= Cacht =

Cacht was a Old Irish feminine given name used during the medieval period.

== People ==
- Cacht dercu Corco Cullu, Queen of Connacht, fl. late 7th century.
- Cacht ingen Cellaig, Queen of Ailech, fl. late 7th century
- Cacht ingen Ragnaill, Queen of Munster or Queen of Ireland, married 1032, died 1054.
- Cacht Ni Morda, Queen of Ui Muirdeagh, fl. 1114.
- Cacht Bean Ui Raighilligh, died 1231.

== See also ==
- List of Irish-language given names
