= Domnall ua Néill =

High King of Ireland from 956 to 980

Domhnall ua Néill (old spelling: Domnall ua Néill; anglicised as Donal O'Neill) (died 980) was High King of Ireland from 956 to 980.

Domnall was the son of Muirchertach mac Néill, and grandson of Niall Glúndub, a member of the Cenél nEógain northern Uí Néill. He became co-King of Ailech with his brother Flaithbertach ua Néill on the death of his father in 943. He became High King of Ireland on the death of his maternal cousin Congalach Cnogba of the southern Uí Néill sept of the Síl nÁedo Sláine.

Domnall is considered to have been an effective ruler who introduced military reforms later credited to Brian Boru. Much of his reign was spent in war against his sister Dúnflaith's husband Amlaíb Cuarán, the King of Dublin. In 980 he abdicated and entered the monastery Armagh where he died shortly afterwards.

Domnall was called "High King of Ireland" (ard-rí Érenn) in his obituary, and was the last of his family to hold the title. He was succeeded by Máel Sechnaill mac Domnaill of Clann Cholmáin.

Domnall's children included Muiredach, whose son Lochlann may have been the ancestor of Domnall Ua Lochlainn, and Muirchertach, ancestor of the O'Neills of Tír Eógain. His grandson Flaithbertach Ua Néill was King of Ailech and the leading figure among the Uí Néill, certainly from the death of Máel Sechnaill in 1022, if not earlier.

Domnall ua Néill Cenél nEógain
Regnal titles
Preceded by Muirchertach mac Néill	King of Ailech; 943–980 with Flaithbertach mac Muirchertaig meic Néill (943–949); Flaithbertach mac Conchobair, Tadg mac Conchobair and Conn mac Conchobair (956–962); Murchad Glun re Lar mac Flaithbertaigh (962–972)	Succeeded by Fergal mac Domnaill meic Conaing
Preceded by Congalach Cnogba	High King of Ireland; 956–980	Succeeded by Máel Sechnaill mac Domnaill
