= Dub Lémna =

Dub Lemna was a Middle Irish feminine given name.

== People ==
- Dub Lemna ingen Tighearnáin, Queen of Ireland, died 941.
