= Dub Lémna ingen Tighearnáin =

Dub Lémna
- Princess of Breifne; Queen consort of Mide; Queen consort of Ireland
- Died: 943
- Spouse: Donnchad Donn
- Issue: Conn; Domnall Donn; Flann; Óebfhinn
- Father: Tighearnáin mac Seallachan

Dub Lemna ingen Tighearnáin, (also Dub Leamna) Queen of Ireland, died 943.

== Background ==
Dub Lemna was a daughter of Tighearnáin mac Seallachan, King of Breifne (died c. 888). Her brother, Ruarc mac Tighearnáin (fl. c. 893), was the eponym and ancestor of the clan Ó Ruairc, Kings of Breifne.

== Marriage and children ==
Dub Lemna married Donnchad Donn of the Clann Cholmáin, who was King of Mide and High King of Ireland from 919 till his death in 944. She was his third wife. Her children by Donnchad are uncertain but they do not include Oengus mac Donnchada, who appears to have been a son of Cainnech ingen Canannán of Ailech, who died in 929.

This leaves sons Conn (died 944) and Domnall Donn (died 952), daughters Flann ingen Donnchad Donn (died 940) and Óebfhinn ingen Donnchad Donn.

== Annalistic reference ==
The Chronicon Scotorum, sub anno 943, state that "Dub Léna daughter of Tigernán, king of Bréifne, wife of the king of Temair, i.e. Donnchad son of Flann, dies.."

== See also ==
- Dub Lémna
