= Donnchad Donn =

Irish king (died 944)

High King of Ireland
- Reign: 919–944
- Predecessor: Niall Glúndub
- Successor: Congalach Cnogba

King of Mide
- Reign: 919–944
- Predecessor: Conchobar mac Flainn
- Successor: Oengus mac Donnchada
- Died: 944
- Spouse: Cainnech ingen Canannán; Órlaith íngen Cennétig; Dub Lémna ingen Tighearnáin
- Issue: Conn; Óengus; Domnall Donn; Flann; Óebfhinn
- House: Clann Cholmáin
- Father: High King Flann Sinna
- Mother: Gormlaith ingen Flann mac Conaing

Donnchad Donn mac Flainn (Duncan of the Brown Hair, son of Flann) (died 944) was High King of Ireland and King of Mide. He belonged to Clann Cholmáin, a branch of the southern Uí Néill.

== Origins ==
Donnchad was the son of High King Flann Sinna by his wife Gormlaith ingen Flann mac Conaing. The date of his birth is not known, but he was apparently an adult in 904 when he is found as the leader, or figurehead, of a challenge to his father at Kells. The Annals of Ulster state that many of Donnchad's associates were beheaded by Flann, and that the High King profaned the sanctuary at Kells to seize Donnchad.

Donnchad again rebelled against his father in 915, with the support of his brother Conchobar, but this rebellion was suppressed by his sister Gormlaith's husband, and his father's heir, Niall Glúndub. When Flann died in 916, Niall Glúndub succeeded him as King of Tara, while Conchobar became King of Mide, the kingship of Clann Cholmáin.

Niall and Conchobar were both killed on 14 September 919, in battle against the Foreigners—Vikings and Norse-Gaels—at Dublin. Other Irish kings and princes among the dead were another of Donnchad's sister's husbands, Máel Mithig mac Flannacáin, Niall Glúndub's brother's son and heir-designate Flaithbertach mac Domnaill, "and many other nobles".

Donnchad succeeded to the kingship of Mide, and to the high kingship of Ireland. He immediately had his brother Áed blinded. Two years later, Donnchad disposed of another brother, the annals saying: "Domnall grandson of Máel Sechnaill was deceitfully killed by his brother Donnchad, which was fitting." Some years later, Donnchad disposed of his nephew, Máel Ruanaid, Conchobar's son.

== Reign ==
Donnchad's first venture was a campaign against armies of the Foreigners in modern County Louth, "in which a very large number [of the Foreigners] were slaughtered." The majority of the reports of battles with the Foreigners thereafter in Donnchad's reign concern "the Hector of the western world", the indefatigable Muirchertach mac Néill—Muirchertach of the Leather Cloaks—the King of Ailech and likely to have been Donnchad's successor had he not died in battle against the Foreigners on 26 February 943. Donnchad's relations with Muirchertach, his daughter's husband, were not good, and conflict between them is recorded in 927, 929, and 938. Muirchertach's wife died in 940, and in 941 he raided Mide, Osraige, and Munster, taking the Munster king Cellachán Caisil hostage as a demonstration of his power, and Donnchad's limited authority.

On Donnchad's death, he was succeeded as King of Tara by his sister's son, Congalach Cnogba, a member of the Síl nÁedo Sláine branch of the Uí Néill. Donnchad's son Óengus became King of Mide.

== Family ==
Donnchad was married three times. His first wife was Cainnech ingen Canannán (died 929), daughter of the King of the northern Uí Néill sept of the Cenél Conaill. His second wife was Órlaith íngen Cennétig, sister of Brian Boru of the Dál gCais. Órlaith was killed in 941, apparently on Donnchad's order, perhaps due to a sexual relationship between her and her stepson Óengus. Donnchad's third wife, Dub Lémna ingen Tighearnáin (died in 943), was the daughter of the king of Bréifne. Charles Doherty notes that Donnchad's wives all came from rising families. The Ua Canannáin of Tír Ċonaill, the Dál gCais of Thomond, and the Ua Ruairc of Bréifne were among the leading families of the 11th and 12th centuries.

Donnchad's sons included Conn (died 944), Óengus his successor (died 945), and Domnall Donn (died 952), the father of the future King of Tara Máel Sechnaill mac Domnaill. His daughters were Flann ingen Donnchadha (died 940), wife of Muirchertach mac Néill, and Óebfhinn ingen Donnchadha (died 952).

His sister and only known full-sibling, Gormflaith ingen Flann Sinna (c.870–948), was Queen of Tara.

== Family tree ==
Family of Donnchad Donn

Gormlaith ingen Flann mac Conaing

Flann Sinna

other wives

Donnchad Donn

Gormflaith

Cerball

Óengus

Conchobar

Lígach

Máel Ruanaid

Áed

Donnell

Muirgel

- Cainnech ingen Canannán (died 929)
- Órlaith íngen Cennétig (ex. 941)
- Dub Lemna ingen Tighearnáin (died 943)

Conn
(died 944)

Óengus
(died 945)

Domnall Donn
(died 952)

Flann
(died 940)

Muirechertach mac Néill

Óebfhinn
(died 952)

Máel Sechnaill mac Domnaill

Domnall ua Néill

Donnchad Donn Clann Cholmáin
Regnal titles
Preceded by Niall Glúndub	High King of Ireland; 919–944	Succeeded by Congalach Cnogba
Preceded by Conchobar mac Flainn	King of Mide; 919–944	Succeeded by Oengus mac Donnchada
