= Máel Muire ingen Cináeda =

Irish princess (842-912)

Máel Muire
- Queen consort of Ireland
- Born: 842
- Died: 913
- Spouse: Áed Findliath; Flann Sinna
- Issue: Niall Glúndub; Domnall mac Áeda
- House: Alpin
- Father: Kenneth MacAlpin

Máel Muire ingen Cináeda was a daughter ("ingen") of Kenneth MacAlpin (Cináed mac Ailpin), King of Dal Riáta. She married two important Irish kings of the Uí Néill.

Her first husband was Áed Findliath (r. 862–879), of the Cenél nEógain, King of Ailech and High King of Ireland. Niall Glúndub, ancestor of the O'Neill dynasty, was the son of this marriage.

Her second husband was Flann Sinna of Clann Cholmáin, King of Mide and also High King of Ireland. As the daughter, wife and mother of kings, when Máel Muire died in 913, her death was reported by the Annals of Ulster, an unusual thing for the male-centred chronicles of that time.

== See also ==
- Máel Muire (female name)
