= Gormlaith ingen Flann mac Conaing =

Queen of Tara, Ireland

Gormlaith ingen Conaing mac Flainn (fl. 870) was a Queen of Tara, Ireland.

Gormlaith was a daughter of Conaing mac Flainn, King of Brega, and the unnamed daughter of Niall Caille and Gormflaith ingen Donncadha. Her known siblings included Cináed mac Conaing (died 851) and Flann mac Conaing (died 868), both of whom were Kings of Brega.

She was the first wife of Flann Sinna, High-King of Ireland, by whom she had Gormflaith ingen Flann Sinna and Donnchad Donn.

Via Gormflaith, she was ancestor to the O'Neill dynasty of Ulster. Donnchad Donn was the ancestor to the Ua Mael Seachlainn kings of Mide.

== Family tree ==
                                                    Donnchad Midi,(733–6 February 797)
    Áed mac Néill (died 819)                        |
  = Medb ingen Indrechtach mac Muiredaig            |________________________________________________ 
    |                                               |                                     |
    |                                               |                                     |
   Niall Caille, died 846. = Gormflaith ingen Donncadha, died 861.      Conchobar mac Donnchada, d. 833. 
                               |
    ___________________________|_________________________
    |                                                   |
    |                                                   |
    Daughter = Conaing mac Flainn (d. 849)       Áed Findliath, d. 879.
             |
    _________|_______________________________________________________________________________
    |                                                         |                             |
    |                                                         |                             |
    Gormlaith = Flann Sinna (d. 916)              Cináed mac Conaing (died 851)      Flann (died 868) 
                    |             
    ________________|____________________________________
   |                                                    |            
   |                                                    |             
   Gormflaith ingen Flann Sinna, d. 948.         Donnchad Donn         
  =Niall Glúndub                                        |                      
   |                                                    |
   |                                                    |
   Muirchertach mac Néill                      Donnall, King of Tara
   |                                                    |
   |                                                    | 
   Domnall ua Neill                           Máel Sechnaill mac Domnaill
   |                                                    |
   |                                                    |
   O'Neill dynasty                        Ua Mael Sechlainn Kings of Mide
