= Congalach Cnogba =

High King of Ireland

High King of Ireland
- Reign: 944–956
- Predecessor: Donnchad Donn
- Successor: Domnall ua Néill
- Died: 956; Dún Ailinne
- House: Síl nÁedo Sláine

Conghalach Cnoghbha (older spelling: Congalach Cnogba or Congalach mac Máel Mithig) was High King of Ireland, according to the lists in the Annals of the Four Masters, from around 944 to 956. Congalach is one of the twelve "kings of Ireland" listed in the hand of the original scribe of the Annals of Ulster.

A member of the Síl nÁedo Sláine Kings of Brega, a branch of the southern Uí Néill, Congalach was a descendant in the tenth generation of Áed Sláine, which was presented as the basis for his kingship. Maternally, Congalach was a member of Clann Cholmáin, the dominant branch of the southern Uí Néill, a grandson of Flann Sinna and sister's son of his predecessor as High King Donnchad Donn. The Annals of Innisfallen, rather than having Congalach as sole High King, associate him with his frequent enemy Ruaidrí ua Canannáin of the Cenél Conaill.

The Irish annals record Congalach at war with most of his neighbours, variously ally and enemy of the Norse-Gael king of Dublin Amlaíb Cuarán. Congalach eventually met his death fighting the Laigin and the Norse-Gaels of Dublin in 956, in an ambush at Dún Ailinne (County Kildare).

Congalach Cnogba Síl nÁedo Sláine
Regnal titles
Preceded by Donnchad Donn	High King of Ireland; 944–956	Succeeded by Domnall ua Néill
