= Máel Sechnaill mac Domnaill =

High King of Ireland from 980 to 1002

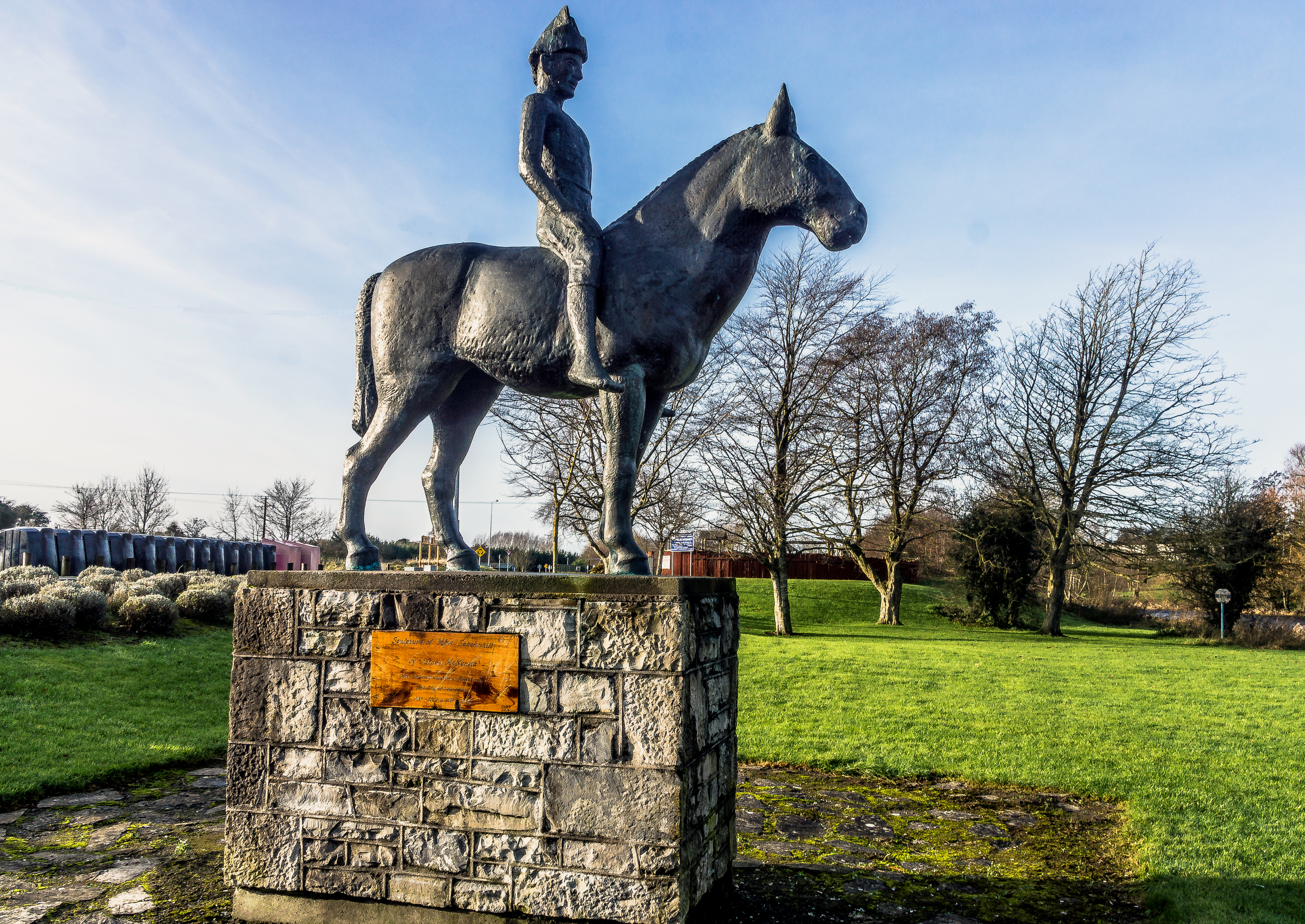
- An imaginative sculpture depicting Máel Seachnaill

King of Mide
- In office 980–1022

High King of Ireland
- 1st reign: 980–1002
- Predecessor: Domnall ua Néill
- Successor: Brian Boru
- 2nd reign: 1014–1022
- Predecessor: Brian Boru
- Successor: Donnchad mac Briain
- Born: 949; Kingdom of Mide
- Died: 2 September 1022; Lough Ennell, Kingdom of Mide
- Spouses: Gormflaith ingen Murchada; Máel Muire ingen Amlaíb
- Issue: Conchobar; Flann; Congalach; Domnall; Murchad Rua; Muirchertach; Colmán/Coloman of Stockerau
- Dynasty: Clann Cholmáin
- Father: Domnall Donn
- Mother: Dúnfhlaith

Máel Sechnaill mac Domnaill (Note: Modern Irish: Maolsheachlann mac Domhnaill) (949 – 2 September 1022), also called Máel Sechnaill II or Máel Sechnaill Mór, was a King of Mide and High King of Ireland. His great victory at the Battle of Tara against Olaf Cuaran in 980 resulted in Gaelic Irish control of the Kingdom of Dublin. His name is sometimes anglicised as Malachy.

== First reign as High King ==
Máel Sechnaill belonged to the Clann Cholmáin branch of the Uí Néill dynasty. He was the grandson of Donnchad Donn, great-grandson of Flann Sinna and great-great-grandson of the first Máel Sechnaill, Máel Sechnaill mac Máele Ruanaid. The Kings of Tara or High Kings of Ireland had for centuries alternated between the various Uí Néill branches. By Máel Sechnaill's time this alternating succession passed between Clann Cholmáin in the south and the Cenél nEógain in the north, so that he succeeded Domnall ua Néill in 980. This system had survived previous challenges by outsiders including the kings of Ulster, Munster and Leinster, and the Viking invasions.

== Defeat of Olaf Cuaran at the Battle of Tara ==
In 980, Olav Cuarán, King of Dublin, summoned auxiliaries from Norse-ruled Scottish Isles and from Mann and attacked Meath, but was defeated by Máel Sechnaill at the Battle of Tara. Reginald, Olaf's heir, was killed. Máel Sechnaill followed up his victory with a siege of Dublin which surrendered after three days and nights. When Maél Sechnaill took Dublin in 980, according to the Annals of Tigernach, he freed all the slaves then residing in the city:

This then that Maelseachnaill proclaimed the famous rising when he said: "Let every one of the Gaels who is in the Foreigner's province come forth to his own country for peace and comfort." That captivity was the Babylonian captivity of Ireland; twas next to the captivity of Hell.

== Battle of Glenmama ==
In 997, at a royal meeting near Clonfert, Máel Sechnaill met with his long-time rival Brian Boru, King of Munster. The two kings made a truce, by which Brian was granted rule over the southern half of Ireland, while Máel Sechnaill retained the northern half and high kingship. In honour of this arrangement, Máel Sechnaill handed over to Brian the hostages he had taken from Dublin and Leinster; and in 998, Brian handed over to Máel Sechnaill the hostages of Connacht. In the same year, Brian and Máel Sechnaill began co-operating against the Norse of Dublin for the first time.

Late in 999, however, the Leinstermen, historically hostile to domination by either the Uí Néill overkings or the King of Munster, allied themselves with the Norse of Dublin and revolted against Brian. The Annals of the Four Masters records that Brian and Máel Sechnaill united their forces, and according to the Annals of Ulster, they met the Leinster-Dublin army at Glenmama on Thursday, 30 December 999. Glenmama, near Lyons Hill in Ardclough, County Kildare, between Windmill Hill and Blackchurch, was the ancient stronghold of the Kings of Leinster. The Munster-Meath army defeated the Leinster-Dublin army. Ó Corráin refers to it as a "crushing defeat" of Leinster and Dublin, while The dictionary of English history says the battle effectively "quelled" the "desperate revolt" of Leinster and Dublin. Most importantly, the defeat left the road to Dublin "free and unimpeded for the victorious legions of Brian and Mael Sechlainn".

== Overthrow and restoration ==
The system of alternating succession between the various Uí Néill branches was ended by Brian Boru's so-called overthrow of Máel Sechnaill in 1002. In fact this was a bloodless shift resulting from the failure of the Northern Uí Néill, his kinsmen, to support Máel Sechnaill against the aspirations of the extremely militarized overlord of Munster. Brian would have little more success with them himself.

Because of the death of Brian Boru in 1014, as well as the death of his son, grandson and many other Munster nobles at the Battle of Clontarf, Máel Sechnaill succeeded in regaining the titular High Kingship, with the aid of his northern kinsman Flaithbertach Ua Néill, but the High Kingship, albeit with opposition, did not reappear until Diarmait mac Maíl na mBó of Leinster rose to power. Clann Cholmáin provided no further High Kings, but the northern Uí Néill of the Cenél nEógain provided two: Domnall Ua Lochlainn and Muirchertach Mac Lochlainn.

== Marriages and issue ==
Máel Sechnaill had two known wives:

- Gormflaith ingen Murchada
- Máel Muire ingen Amlaíb, possibly a daughter of the former but by another man

He also had six known children:

- Conchobar (d 1030)
- Flann (d 1013)
- Congalach (d 1017)
- Domnall (d 1019)
- Murchad Rua (d 1049)
- Muirchertach (d 1049)

His senior descendant, as of the mid-20th century, was Cornelius Frederic McLoughlin, Chief of the Name, born 11 July 1897.

Máel Sechnaill mac Domnaill Clann Cholmáin
Regnal titles
| Preceded by Muirchertach mac Mael Sechnaill | King of Mide c. 975 – 1022 | Succeeded by Mael Sechnaill Got mac Mael Sechnaill |
| Preceded by Domnall ua Néill | High King of Ireland; 980–1002 | Succeeded by Brian Boru |
| Preceded by Brian Boru | High King of Ireland; 1014–1022 | Succeeded by Diarmait mac Maíl na mBó |
