= Domnall mac Áeda =

King of Ailech
- Reign: 887–911
- Predecessor: Flaithbertach mac Murchado
- Successor: Niall Glúndub
- Died: 21 March 915
- Issue: Flann; Flaithbertach; Fergal; Conchobar
- House: Cenél nEógain
- Father: Áed Findliath
- Mother: Gormlaith Rapach of Ulaid

Domnall mac Áeda (died 915), also known as Domnall Dabaill, was a King of Ailech. He was a son of Áed Findliath mac Néill, High King of Ireland. Domnall was a half-brother of Niall Glúndub mac Áeda, a man with whom he shared the kingship of Ailech. From Domnall would descend the Mac Lochlainn dynasty.

== Family ==
He was a member of the Cenél nEógain branch of the Uí Néill dynasty. His father was Áed Findliath mac Néill, High King of Ireland. Another son of Áed Findliath, and half-brother of Domnall, was Niall Glúndub. Domnall and Niall Glúndub shared the kingship of Ailech for several years. In 905, the Annals of Ulster reports that the two had prepared to fight before coming to an understanding. In 908, the men campaigned in Meath against the rival Clann Cholmáin branch of the Uí Néill.

== Life and death ==
Domnall's son, Flann, died in 906. Domnall retired to a monastic life in 911, after which Niall Glúndub ruled as sole King of Ailech. Domnall died on 21 March 915. The deaths of Domnall, as well as those of his father and half-brother, are recorded by the Chronicle of the Kings of Alba. The notice of Domnall's death in this source has caused confusion in regards to the historiography of the Kingdom of Strathclyde. Specifically, Domnall's obituary is placed immediately after that of Dyfnwal, King of Strathclyde. The fact that the chronicle renders Domnall's kingdom as elig, a term which can be mistakenly interpreted as an abbreviation of eligitur ("he was selected"), has led to the erroneous belief that the ruling Alpínid dynasty of Alba had inserted a member of its own—an otherwise unknown brother of Custantín mac Áeda, King of Alba named Domnall—to succeed the deceased Dyfnwal.
