= Áed Findliath =

High King of Ireland
- Reign: 862–879
- Predecessor: Máel Sechnaill mac Máele Ruanaid
- Successor: Flann Sinna

King of Ailech
- Reign: c. 855–879
- Predecessor: Máel Dúin mac Áeda
- Successor: Murchad mac Máele Dúin
- Died: 20 November 879; Druim Inasclainn, County Louth
- Burial: Armagh or Dromiskin
- Spouses: Gormlaith Rapach; Land ingen Dúngaile; Máel Muire ingen Cináeda
- Issue: Domnall; Niall Glúndub
- House: Cenél nEógain
- Father: Niall Caille
- Mother: Gormflaith ingen Donnchada

Áed mac Néill (died 879), called Áed Findliath ("fair-grey Áed"; Modern Irish: Aodh Fionnadhliath) to distinguish him from his paternal grandfather Áed Oirdnide, was king of Ailech and High King of Ireland. He was also called Áed Olach ("The anointing one") according to Baile in Scáil, section 51. A member of the northern Uí Néill kindred of the Cenél nEógain, Áed was the son of Niall Caille.

== Background ==
From the death of Áed Allán in 743 until the overthrow of Máel Sechnaill mac Domnaill by Brian Boru in 1002, the succession to the High Kingship of Ireland alternated between northern and southern branches of the Uí Néill with the north represented by members of the Cenél nÉogain, Áed's paternal kindred, and the south by the Clann Cholmáin, his mother's kin. Francis John Byrne describes this as "a fragile convention, marked by watchful jealousy rather than friendly accord".

During the reign of Máel Sechnaill mac Máele Ruanaid, who succeeded Áed's father as High King, the balance of power between north and south which had ensured the alternating succession appeared to be tipping in favour of the southern Clann Cholmáin kindred. The weakness of the Kings of Munster following the death of the powerful Feidlimid mac Crimthainn in 847 led to repeated attacks on Munster by Máel Sechnaill in the 850s and a submission by the kings of Munster in 858. In 859, Osraige was made subject to the Uí Néill, and this led to open warfare between Máel Sechnaill and Áed.

== Origins and family ==
Áed was the son of Niall Caille and Gormlaith. His mother, Gormflaith ingen Donncadha, is called "Gormlaith of the dazzling white complexion" by the Banshenchas. His maternal grandfather was Donnchad Midi, his paternal grandfather Áed Oirdnide. His father, his mother's brother, Conchobar mac Donnchada, and both of his grandfathers had been counted as High Kings of Ireland.

The names of three of Áed's wives are recorded, although the order of his marriages is perhaps uncertain. His first wife may have been Gormlaith Rapach, "the harsh", daughter of Muiredach mac Eochada, king of Ulster. The Banshenchas say that Domnall mac Áeda was her son, and Eithne, who married Flann Sinna, may have been her daughter.

Áed's second wife, Land ingen Dúngaile (sister of Cerball mac Dúnlainge, king of Osraige) was the widow of his predecessor as High King, Máel Sechnaill mac Máele Ruanaid, a grandson of Donnchad Midi.

His third known wife was Máel Muire, probably the daughter of Cináed mac Ailpín, the king of the Picts in Britain. She was the mother of Niall Glúndub. On Áed's death she married his successor Flann Sinna.

Other children of Áed included Domnall Dabaill (ancestor of Domnall Ua Lochlainn); a son named Máel Dub, reputed a saint; and Máel Dúin, who ruled Ailech as Áed's deputy until his early death in 867.

== Early years ==
Following the death of Neill Caille in 845, Áed's uncle Máel Dúin mac Áeda assumed the kingship of Ailech. When Áed succeeded him is not recorded, but it might have been in 855. Áed is mentioned for the first time in the annals this year, as the Annals of Ulster records that he

made a foray against the Ulaid, and he left behind dead Coinnecán son of Colmán and Flaithbertach son of Niall, and a large number besides

Presumably Flaithbertach was his own brother, and this foray was made to secure Áed's position as king of Ailech.

Áed came into power at a critical period in the history of Ireland. Raids by Norse Vikings had taken place for half a century, and the Norse settlements now seemed to have become permanent establishments, more than just bases for raids. They also now had an effective leadership under Amlaíb Conung and Ímar. At this time, both the contemporary annalists as well as modern historians refer to them not just as Vikings, foreigners or pagans, but also Norse-Irish or Norse-Gaels.

Áed Findliath has been described as one of the Irish high-kings who most effectively fought the Norse expansion in Ireland. He did indeed win some crucial battles against the Norse-Gaels; the first recorded victory is in 856, at the battle of Glenn Foichle, six years prior to him becoming high-king. The reigning High-King at the time, Mael Sechnaill, seemed more concerned with the internal Irish power struggle, particularly in Munster, than with engaging the Norse. There is, however, one reference in 856 to him fighting against "pagans" (Vikings) with the support of the Norse-Gaels. This could be interpreted as an alliance between the Norse settlers and the established Irish society against marauders.

In 858, Máel Sechnaill finally managed to establish control over Munster, and in 859 he also made a peace settlement with Cerball mac Dúnlainge, king of Osraige (forced upon him by Cerball, who had allied himself with Amlaíb and Ímar and ravaged Míde). Máel Sechnaill now turned his attention to the north, where the growing power of Áed Findliath had become a threat against him as head of Uí Néill. In 860 he brought an army consisting of forces from all of the southern part of Ireland to Armagh. While they were camped there, Áed Findliath attacked. The outcome of the battle seem to have been some sort of draw.

By now it was Áed Findliath who sought an alliance with the Norse in Dublin. In 861 as well as 862 he plundered Míde in co-operation with Norse forces; in 862 he also had the support of Flann mac Conaing, king of Brega.

== King of Tara ==
Máel Sechnaill mac Máele Ruanaid died 20 November 862, and he was on that occasion described in the Annals of Ulster as ri h-Erenn uile, king of all Ireland. That was a title that would never be used to refer to Áed Findliath, even though he assumed the kingship of Tara following Máel Sechnaill's death, and has also been counted in the lists of High Kings of Ireland. His kingship was disputed throughout his 17-year-long reign, and he did not even have support from the southern clans of Uí Néill. The annals show that the Taillten Fair was not held in six of those 17 years, which is a strong indication of unrest.

The Norse of Dublin had, by the beginning of Áed's reign, become an important, if not very trustworthy, ally in the struggle for power in Míde. Máel Sechnaill's successor as head of Clann Cholmain and king of Míde, Lorcán mac Cathail, allied himself with Amlaib, Ímar and Auisle against Flann of Brega. Flann was a former ally of Dublin, and still Áed's most important ally in the central part of Ireland. Lorcán and his Norse allies plundered Brega in 863, and in 864 Conchobar mac Donnchada, king of Lagore (southern Brega) and presumably an ally of Flann against Lorcán, was captured and drowned near Clonard on Amlaib's order. Áed led a host to Míde, captured Lorcán and blinded him.

Áed now had some notable victories against the Norse. He defeated the Vikings at Lough Foyle in 866 and uprooted their settlements. In 866 Amlaíb and Auisle left Ireland with the larger part of the Norse forces, and, in co-operation with the Norse-Gaels from present-day Scotland, they attacked the Picts. Áed seized this opportunity, plundering and burning all the Norse bases (longphorts) in the northern part of Ireland.

In 868 Áed again was confronted by a coalition of his Irish rivals and the Norse-Gaels. According to the Annals of Ulster he defeated "the Uí Neíll of Brega, and the Laigin, and a large force of the foreigners" in a battle at a place called Cell Ua nDaigri (Killineer, County Louth, near Drogheda). Flann of Brega was killed in this battle. This battle has been depicted as a decisive victory over the Norse. Amlaib and Ímar were, however, very active in Ireland during the following years and seem to have suffered little harm to their ambition or strength. It is probably more accurate to regard this battle as a victory over the southern Uí Neíll and Leinster. In 870 Áed followed up his victory from 868 by invading Leinster with the support of his new ally Cerball of Osraige, and then invaded Leinster again in 874.

Áed Findliath died on 20 November 879, at Druim Inasclainn. in the territory of Conaille. On that occasion he was described as "king of Tara" (rex Temorie), although a poem from the annals refers to him as "over-king of the Irish" (airdri Gaidhel). He was buried at either Armagh or Dromiskin.

== Notes ==
Áed Findliath Cenél nEógain
Regnal titles
Preceded by Máel Dúin mac Áeda	King of Ailech c. 855 – 879	Succeeded by Murchad mac Máele Dúin
Preceded by Máel Sechnaill mac Máele Ruanaid	High King of Ireland; 862–879	Succeeded by Flann Sinna
