= Kings of Ailech =

Over-kings of the medieval Irish province of Ailech

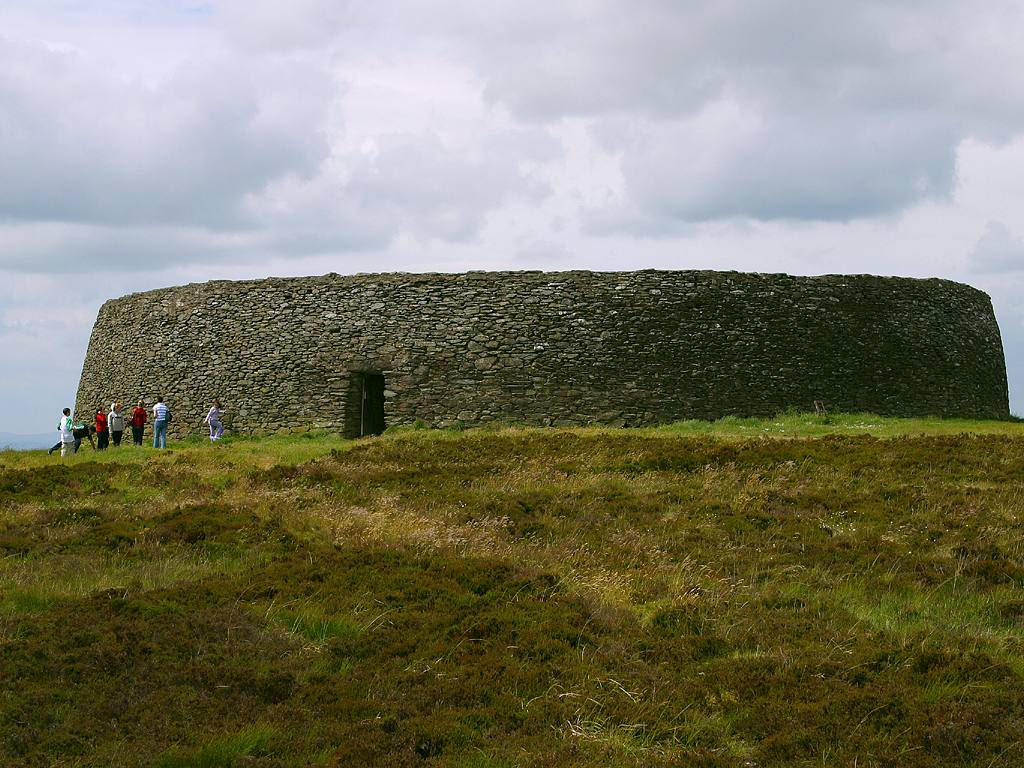
Exterior view of the Grianan of Aileach in County Donegal, the royal fort of the Kingdom of Aileach

The Kings of Ailech were the over-kings of the medieval Irish province of Ailech in north-western Ireland. It encompassed the territories of the Cenél nEógain and Cenél Conaill. After the battle of Cloítech in 789 its kings were exclusively from the Cenél nEógain. The royal fort for Ailech was the Grianan of Aileach, a hillfort on top of Greenan Mountain in modern-day County Donegal, Ireland.

== Early kings (5th–8th centuries) ==
Earlier Kings of Cenél nEógain and Ailech included:

- Eógan mac Néill Noigallach (died 465)
- Muiredach mac Eógain (died c. 489)
- Muirchertach mac Muiredaig (died 534)
- Forggus mac Muirchertaig (died 566)
- Domnall Ilchelgach mac Muirchertaig (died 566)
- Báetán mac Muirchertaig (died 572)
- Eochaid mac Domnaill (died 572)
- Colcu mac Domnaill (died 580)
- Colmán Rímid mac Báetáin (died 604)
- Áed Uaridnach mac Domnaill (died 612)
- Suibne Menn mac Fiachnai (died 628)
- Máel Fithrich mac Áedo Uaridnach (died 630)
- Ernaine mac Fiachnai (died 636)
- Crundmáel mac Suibni Menn (died c. 660)
- Ferg mac Crundmaíl (died c. 668)
- Máel Dúin mac Máele Fithrich (died 681)
- Fland mac Máele Tuile (died 700)
- Urthuile mac Máele Tuile.

== Kings between 700 and 1185 ==
The following is a list of their Kings from 700 to 1197. Some were also High Kings of Ireland:

- Fergal mac Máele Dúin 700 – 11 December 722
- Áed Allán mac Fergaile 722–743
- Niall Frossach mac Fergaile 743–770
- Máel Dúin mac Áedo Alláin 770–788
- Áed Oirdnide mac Néill 788–819
- Murchad mac Máele Dúin 819–823
- Niall Caille mac Áeda 823–846
- Máel Dúin mac Áeda 846–867
- Áed Findliath mac Néill c. 855 – 20 November 879
- Murchad mac Máele Dúin 879–887
- Flaithbertach mac Murchado 887–896
- Domnall mac Áeda 887–915
- Niall Glúndub mac Áeda 896 – 15 September 919
- Flaithbertach mac Domnaill 916–919
- Fergal mac Domnaill 919–938
- Muirchertach mac Néill 938 – 26 February 943
- Domnall mac Muirchertaig ua Néill 943–980
- Flaithbertach mac Muirchertaig meic Néill 943
- Ruaidrí ua Canannáin 943–956
- Flaithbertach mac Conchobair 956–962
- Tadg mac Conchobair 956–962
- Conn mac Conchobair 956–962
- Murchad Glun re Lar mac Flaithbertaigh 962–972
- Fergal mac Domnaill meic Conaing 980–989 (still styled as king of Aileach in his obituary in 1000)
- Áed mac Domnaill Ua Néill 989–1004
- Flaithbertach Ua Néill 1004–1031
- Áed mac Flaithbertaig Ua Néill 1031–1033
- Flaithbertach Ua Néill (again) 1033–1036
- Niall mac Máel Sechnaill 1036–1061
- Ardgar mac Lochlainn 1061–1064
- Áed Ua hUalgairg 1064–1067
- Domnall mac Néill 1067–1068
- Áed mac Néill 1068–1083
- Donnchad mac Néill 1083–1083
- Domnall Ua Lochlainn 1083 – 9 February 1121
- Conchobar mac Domnaill 1121–1128
- Magnus Ua Lochlainn 1128–1129
- Conchobar mac Domnaill 1129–1136
- Domhnall Mac Lochlainn 1136–1136
- Muirchertach Mac Lochlainn 1136–1143
- Domnall Ua Gairmledaig 1143–1145
- Muirchertach Mac Lochlainn (again) 1145–1166
- Conchobar mac Muirchertaigh Mac Lochlainn 1166–1167
- Niall Mac Lochlainn 1167–1176
- Aed In Macaem Toinlesc Ua Neill 1167–1177
- Mael Sechlainn mac Muirchertaigh Mac Lochlainn 1177–1185
- Domhnall Mac Aedh Mac Lochlainn 1185–1186
- Ruaidhri Ua Flaithbheartaigh 1186–1187
- Domhnall Mac Aedh Mac Lochlainn (again) 1187–1188
- Muirchertach Mac Muirchertaigh Mac Lochlainn 1188–1196
- Flaithbheartach Ua Maol Doraidh 1196–1197

== Kings post-1185 ==
From 1185, the Cenél nEógain ruled as Kings of Tír Eógain.

The last to actually be styled King of Ailech was Áed Buide Ua Néill (died 1283).

== See also ==
- List of Irish kings
- Irish royal families

== Sources ==
- "Cenel nEogain Kings of Ailech 700–1185", pages 194–195 in A New History of Ireland, volume IX, ed. Byrne, Martin, Moody, 1984.
- T. M. Charles-Edwards; Early Christian Ireland.
- Francis J.Byrne; Irish Kings and High-Kings.
