= Niall Glúndub =

Irish king (died 919)

High King of Ireland
- Reign: 916 - 14 September 919
- Predecessor: Flann Sinna
- Successor: Donnchad Donn

King of Ailech
- Reign: 911 - 14 September 919
- Predecessor: Domnall mac Áeda
- Successor: Fergal mac Domnaill
- Died: 14 September 919; Battle of Islandbridge
- Spouse: Gormflaith ingen Flann Sinna
- Issue: Muirchertach
- House: Niall Caille
- Father: Áed Findliath
- Mother: Máel Muire ingen Cináeda

Niall Glúndub mac Áeda (Modern Irish: Niall Glúndubh mac Aodha, 'Niall Black-Knee, son of Áed'; died 14 September 919) was a 10th-century Irish king of the Cenél nEógain and High King of Ireland. Many Irish kin groups were members of the Uí Néill and traced their descent from Niall of the Nine Hostages (Niall Noígiallach).

His mother was Máel Muire, daughter of Kenneth MacAlpin, King of Scots.

== Biography ==
Son of Áed Findliath, Niall is first recorded succeeding his brother Domnall mac Áeda as King of Ailech after the latter went into religious retirement in 911. Extending his control to neighboring kingdoms, Niall defeated the Kings of Dál nAraidi and Ulaid at the Battles of Glarryford (in present-day County Antrim) and Ballymena before his defeat by high-king Flann Sinna mac Maíl Sechnaill of the Clann Cholmáin Uí Néill at the Battle of Crossakiel (in present-day County Meath). Following Flann's death in 916, Niall succeeded him as High King of Ireland. During his reign, he reestablish the Óenach Tailteann, a traditional gathering of Irish clans. He was married to Gormflaith ingen Flann Sinna. With the support of the clans of Leth Cuinn (Northern half of Ireland), the Uí Néill eventually acknowledged his claim to the throne.

With a surge of Northmen forces the Uí Ímair launched an invasion in the south of Ireland in the years following 914 which greatly weakened the Eoghanacht of Munster and led to the establishment of a longfort at Waterford. Intent on opposing this, and coming to the assistance of Munster, Niall's forces moved south and fought a large battle against a group of Northmen in the summer of 917, ending inconclusively but with the death of many nobles and tributary kings in his following. The army of the King of Leinster which had been called in to reinforce him however was utterly devastated near St Mullins, leaving the province in a tributary position to the Northmen.

Despite his campaigns against the Northmen they continued to settle in large numbers, re-establishing their stronghold in Dublin (after a 15-year gap) and various ports on the eastern coast putting pressure on the Midland kingdom of Midhe. In an effort to bring the war to the Northmen, Niall advanced into Leinster, supported by the Uí Néill clans, the Airgíalla and the Ulaid. However, his forces were decimated by the Northmen under Sihtric Cáech as Niall was killed, along with twelve other chieftains, at the Battle of Islandbridge on 14 September 919.

Another account in the Anglo-Saxon Chronicle has Sihtric Cáech slaying his brother Niall in 921. Glúndub was succeeded as High King by Donnchad Donn mac Flainn, son of Flann Sinna, and as King of Ailech by his son Muirchertach mac Néill, "the Hector of the Western World".

== Family tree ==
    Niall Caille
  = Gormflaith ingen Donncadha
    |
    |____________________________________________________________________________
    |                                                                          |
    |                                                                          |
    Áed Findliath = Gormlaith Rapach = Land ingen Dúngaile  = Máel Muire      unnamed daughter = Conaing mac Flainn
                  |                                          |                                   |
   _______________|                                          |                                   Flann
  |          |                                               |                                   |
  |          |      (mother's identity unknown)              |                                   Gormlaith
  Domnall  Eithne  Domnall Dabaill  Máel Dub  Máel Dúin      |                                 = Flann Sinna
                                                             |                                   |
                                                             |                                   |
                                                             Niall Glúndub, d. 919. = Gormflaith ingen Flann Sinna, c.870-948.
                                                                                    |
                                                                                    | 
                                                                                 Muirchertach mac Néill, d. 943.

== Bibliography ==
- Webb, Alfred. A Compendium of Irish Biography: Comprising Sketches of Distinguished Irishmen and of Eminent Persons Connected with Ireland by Office or by Their Writings, New York: Lemma Publishing Corporation, 1970.

Niall Glúndub Cenél nEógain
Regnal titles
Preceded by Domnall mac Áeda	King of Ailech; 911–919 with Flaithbertach mac Domnaill (916–919)	Succeeded by Fergal mac Domnaill
Preceded by Flann Sinna	High King of Ireland; 916–919	Succeeded by Donnchad Donn
