= Mary Williams =

Mary Williams may refer to:

- Mary Ann Williams (1821–1874), American proponent for Memorial Day
- Mary-Anne Williams, Australian thought leader on innovation, computer scientist, roboticist, and AI researcher
- Mary Burfitt Williams (1882–1956), Australian pathologist and physician
- Mary Burrus Williams (born 1941), American novelist
- Mary Bushnell Williams (1826–1891), American author, poet, translator
- Mary Mildred Williams (1847–1911), born into slavery in Virginia
- Mary Rogers Williams (1857–1907), American artist
- Mary Gilmore Williams (1863–1938), American professor of Greek
- Mary Floyd Williams (1866–1959), American librarian and California historian
- Mary Williams (caricaturist) (1869–1960), American caricaturist who used the pseudonym Kate Carew
- Mary Wilhelmine Williams (1878–1944), historian
- Mary Williams (professor) (1883–1977), Welsh academic of modern languages
- Mary Lou Williams (1910–1981), American jazz pianist, composer, and arranger
  - Mary Lou Williams (album)
- Mary A. Williams, a 19th-century Sandy Hook pilot boat
- Mary Alice Williams (born 1949), former television anchor
- Mary Williams (Wisconsin politician) (born 1949), member of the Wisconsin State Assembly
- Mary Ellen Coster Williams (born 1953), United States Court of Federal Claims judge
- Mary Vesta Williams (1957–2011), American singer-songwriter
- Mary Williams, real name of Kate Carew (1869–1961), American caricaturist
- Mary Williams (activist) (born 1967), American social activist and adopted daughter of Jane Fonda
- Mary Elizabeth Williams, American writer and commentator
- Mary Williams (The Young and the Restless), fictional television character
- Mary Williams, former Chief Secretary of the Isle of Man
- Mary Frances Williams (born 1955), American politician
- Mary Theodore Williams (1868–1931), American Black Catholic nun
- Mary Ethel Williams Barrett (1913–1951), née Williams, American artist and art teacher
- Mary Hobart Williams (c. 1809 – c. 1886), French-Menominee Métis woman and settler in Wisconsin
- Mary Williams, character in Another Man, Another Chance
