= List of people with surname Tully =

Tully is a surname of Irish origin. The surname itself and its variants include Tally, MacTully, Tilly and Flood, all of which can derive from several different unrelated Irish families, such as Ó Maoltuile, Taithligh, Mac Maoltuile, Ó Taithligh, and Mac an Tuile. Some MacTullys changed their name to Flood as tuile is Irish for 'flood'.

Tully is also an anglicised form of the Irish word tulach or tulaigh, meaning 'hill' or 'mound', and is used in various Irish place names.

Notable people with the surname include:

- Alice Tully (1902–1993), American opera singer
- Andrew Tully (speedway rider) (born 1987), British speedway rider
- Andrew Tully (1914–1993), American writer
- B. Joseph Tully (1927–2015), American politician
- Bill Tully (1925–2016), American tennis player
- Bob Tully (1909–1981), American football coach
- Britt Tully (born 1993), Australian rules footballer
- Charlie Tully (1924–1971), Northern Irish footballer and manager
- Chris Tully (born 1982), American politician
- Colin Tully (computer scientist) (1936-2007), British computer scientist who co-developed the world’s first programmable business computer
- Colin Tully (1945–2020), Australian rules footballer and coach
- Craig Tully (born 1976), Scottish footballer and manager
- Daniel P. Tully (1932–2016), American business executive
- Darrell Tully (1917–1997), American football player and coach
- Darrow Tully (1932–2010), American newspaper publisher
- E. C. Tully (1826–1907), American politician
- Fred Tully (1907–1969), English footballer
- George Tully (American football) (1904–1980), American football player
- George Tully (architect) (died 1770), English carpenter and architect
- George Tully (fencer) (1914–1986), Canadian fencer
- Grace Tully (1900–1984), Personal Secretary to Franklin D. Roosevelt
- Heather Tully (born 1980), American politician
- Henri de Tully (1798–1846), French librettist and playwright
- Jack Tully (1885–1966), Australian politician
- James Tully (Irish politician) (1915–1992), Irish politician
- James Tully (philosopher) (born 1946), Canadian philosopher
- James Tully (Australian politician) (1877–1962), Australian politician
- Jasper Tully (1859–1938), Irish Nationalist politician
- Jeff Tully, American medical cybersecurity researcher
- Jim Tully (1886–1947), American writer
- Jim Tully (footballer) (1883–1949), English footballer
- Joan Tully (1907–1973), Australian agricultural scientist
- John A. Tully (born 1947), Australian historian and novelist
- John C. Tully, American theoretical chemist
- John Tully (American football) (born 1952), American football player and coach
- John Tully (Irish politician) (1904–1977), Irish politician
- Judd Tully, American art historian
- Kelley Tully, American politician from Vermont
- Kevin Tully (born 1952), English footballer
- Kivas Tully (1820–1905), Irish-Canadian architect
- Laurie Tully (1917–1981), Australian politician
- Mark Tully (1935–2026), British-Indian journalist
- Mary Jean Crenshaw Tully (1925–2003), American women's rights activist
- Mary Rose Tully (1946–2010), American activist
- May Tully (1880s–1924), Canadian actress, writer, director and producer
- Michael J. Tully Jr. (1933–1997), American politician
- Mike Tully (born 1956), American pole vaulter
- Montgomery Tully (1904–1988), Irish film director and writer
- Nicole Tully (born 1986), American runner
- Patrick Tully, Irish Gaelic footballer and coach
- Pauline Tully, Irish politician
- Peter Tully (1947–1992), Australian artist
- Pinckney R. Tully (1824–1903), American businessman and politician
- Pleasant B. Tully (1829–1897), American politician
- R. Brent Tully (born 1943), American astronomer
- Richard Walton Tully (1877–1945), American playwright
- Roger Tully (1928–2020), English dancer and teacher
- Russell Tully (1949–2013), Australian rules footballer
- Shawn Tully, American business journalist
- Stephen Tully (politician), American politician
- Steve Tully (born 1980), English footballer
- Susan Tully (born 1967), English television actress, producer and director
- Sydney Strickland Tully (1860–1911), Canadian painter
- Tanner Tully (born 1994), American baseball player
- Ted Tully (1930–2003), Canadian football player
- Thomas Tully (1620–1676), English Calvinist priest;
- Tim Tully (born 1954), American neurobiologist
- Tom Tully (writer) (died 2013), British writer
- Tom Tully (1908–1982), American actor
- William Alcock Tully (1830–1905), Irish politician
- William J. Tully (1870–1930), American politician
- William Tully (diver) (1930s–1976), Australian diver

== See also ==
- Tully (given name)
- Tully (disambiguation)
- Tulli, a surname
