= Jacobs Hill =

Protected area in Massachusetts, US

Coordinates: 42.6752°N 72.2028°W

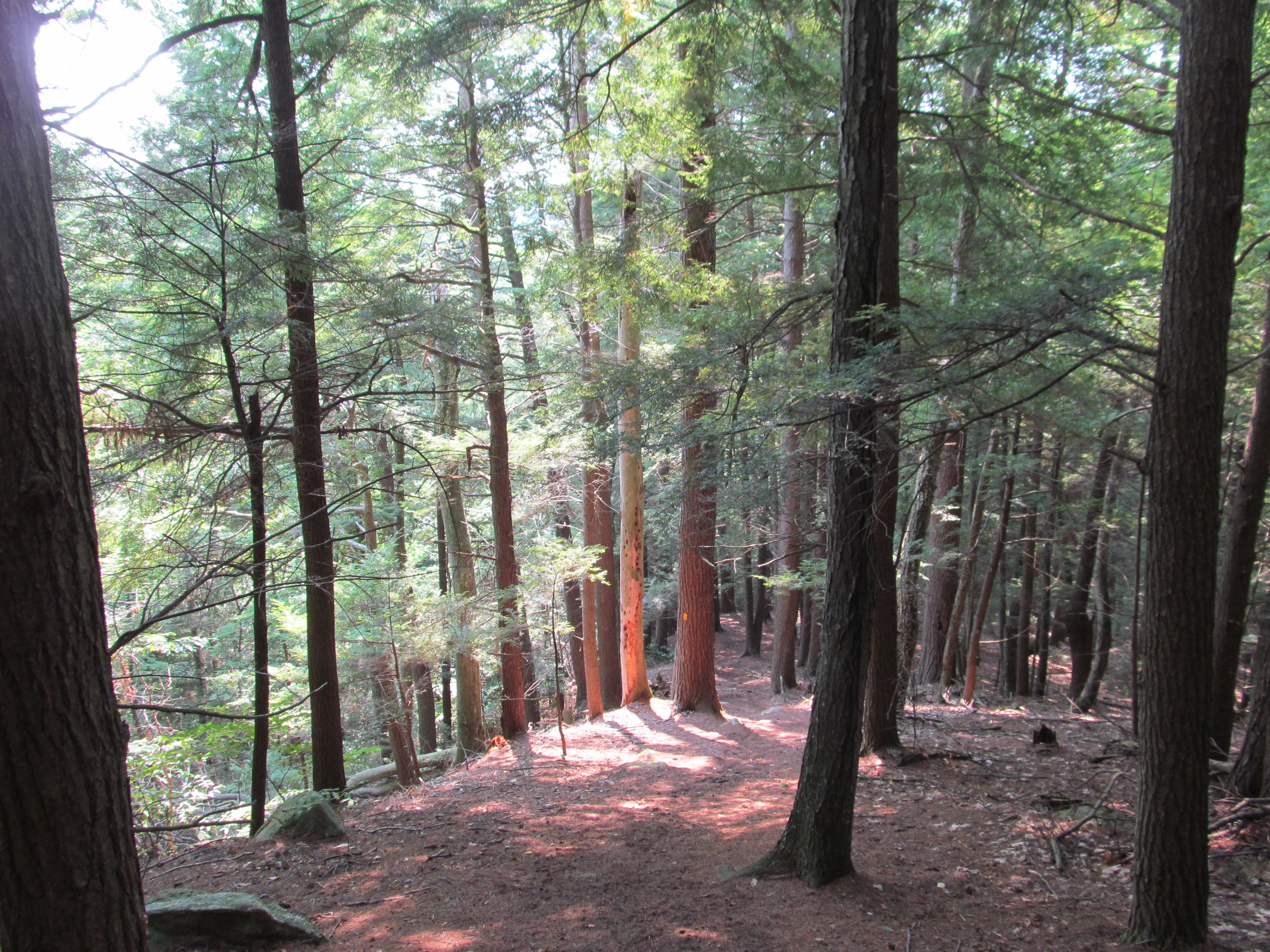
- Tully Trail
- Interactive map of Jacobs Hill
- Established: 1951
- Operator: The Trustees of Reservations
- Website: Jacobs Hill

Jacobs Hill is a 173-acre (70 ha) open space preserve in Royalston, Massachusetts acquired in 1975 by the land conservation non-profit organization The Trustees of Reservations. The preserve includes scenic vistas, ledges, woodlands, a northern bog, and Spirit Falls, a 30 foot (9.1 m) waterfall. The 22-mile (35 km) Tully Trail passes through the property. Views from the ledges include the Berkshires as well as nearby Long Pond and the Tully River Valley, Tully Mountain, and Mount Grace.

== History ==
Acreage was purchased by the Trustees of Reservations in 1975 out of anonymous funds; additional parcels were acquired in 1978 and 1994.

== Recreation and conservation ==
The preserve is open to fishing, walking, picnicking, hunting (in season), cross country skiing, and hiking. A trailhead is located off Massachusetts Route 68 .5 miles (0.80 km) from Royalston center.

Jacobs Hill is part of a larger contiguous area of protected open space, connected by the Tully Trail and including the United States Army Corps of Engineers' Tully Lake flood control project, The Trustees of Reservations' Royalston Falls and Doane's Falls properties, and Massachusetts state forest land. Tully Lake Campground, a 35-site walk-in and tent-only facility jointly managed by the Army Corps of Engineers and the Trustees of Reservations, is located along the Tully Trail to the south.
