= Tholl (surname) =

Tholl is a surname. Notable people with the surname include:

- Bonnie Tholl (born 1969), American former softball player
- John Tholl (born 1944), American politician

== See also ==
- Thill (surname)
- Tol (surname)
- Tull (surname)
- Thiel (surname)
