= Tully =

Tully may refer to:

== People ==
- Tully (surname), origins and history of the Tully surname in Ireland
  - List of people with surname Tully
- Tully (given name), a unisex given name derived from the surname

Others

- Marcus Tullius Cicero, or Cicero, a Roman philosopher, politician, lawyer and orator
- Tully, pen name of Alexander Hamilton in editorials denouncing the instigators of the Whiskey Rebellion

== Places ==
=== Australia ===
- Tully (Parish), New South Wales, a civil parish of Yungnulgra County
- Tully, Queensland, a town in the Cassowary Coast Region
- Tully Falls, Queensland
- Tully River, Queensland, Australia

=== France ===
- Tully, Somme, a commune in France

=== Ireland (Republic) ===
- Tully, a civil parish in Dublin, Republic of Ireland
- Tully, County Galway, a village on the Renvyle Peninsula
- Tully, County Kildare, a civil parish in County Kildare, Republic of Ireland
- Tully, County Offaly, a townland spanning Ardnurcher and Kilmanaghan civil parishes, barony of Kilcoursey, County Offaly, Republic of Ireland
- Tully Mountain (Ireland), County Galway

=== United Kingdom ===
- Tully, County Fermanagh, a townland in County Fermanagh, Northern Ireland
- Tully, County Londonderry, a townland in County Londonderry, Northern Ireland
- Tully, County Tyrone, a townland in County Tyrone, Northern Ireland
- Tully Castle in County Fermanagh, Northern Ireland

=== United States ===
- Tully (town), New York, United States
- Tully (village), New York
- Tully Lake, Massachusetts, a reservoir and flood control project
- Tully Mountain, Massachusetts, United States
- Tully Township, Marion County, Ohio
- Tully Township, Van Wert County, Ohio
- Tully Trail, a hiking trail in Massachusetts

== Arts, entertainment, and media ==
- Tully (2000 film), American drama by Hilary Birmingham set in rural Nebraska
- Tully (2018 film), American comedy-drama about motherhood
- Tully (band), an Australian progressive rock band 1967–72
- House Tully, one of the great houses in George R.R. Martin's fantasy series A Song of Ice and Fire and its adaptations

== Other uses ==
- Tullamore Dew, often referred to as "Tully", a brand of Irish whiskey
- Tully Monster, a fossil
- Tully–Fisher relation, an observation about spiral galaxies
- Tully's Coffee, an American coffee brand

== See also ==
- Tull (disambiguation)
- Tulli (disambiguation)
