= Doane's Falls =

Waterfalls in Royalston, Massachusetts, USA

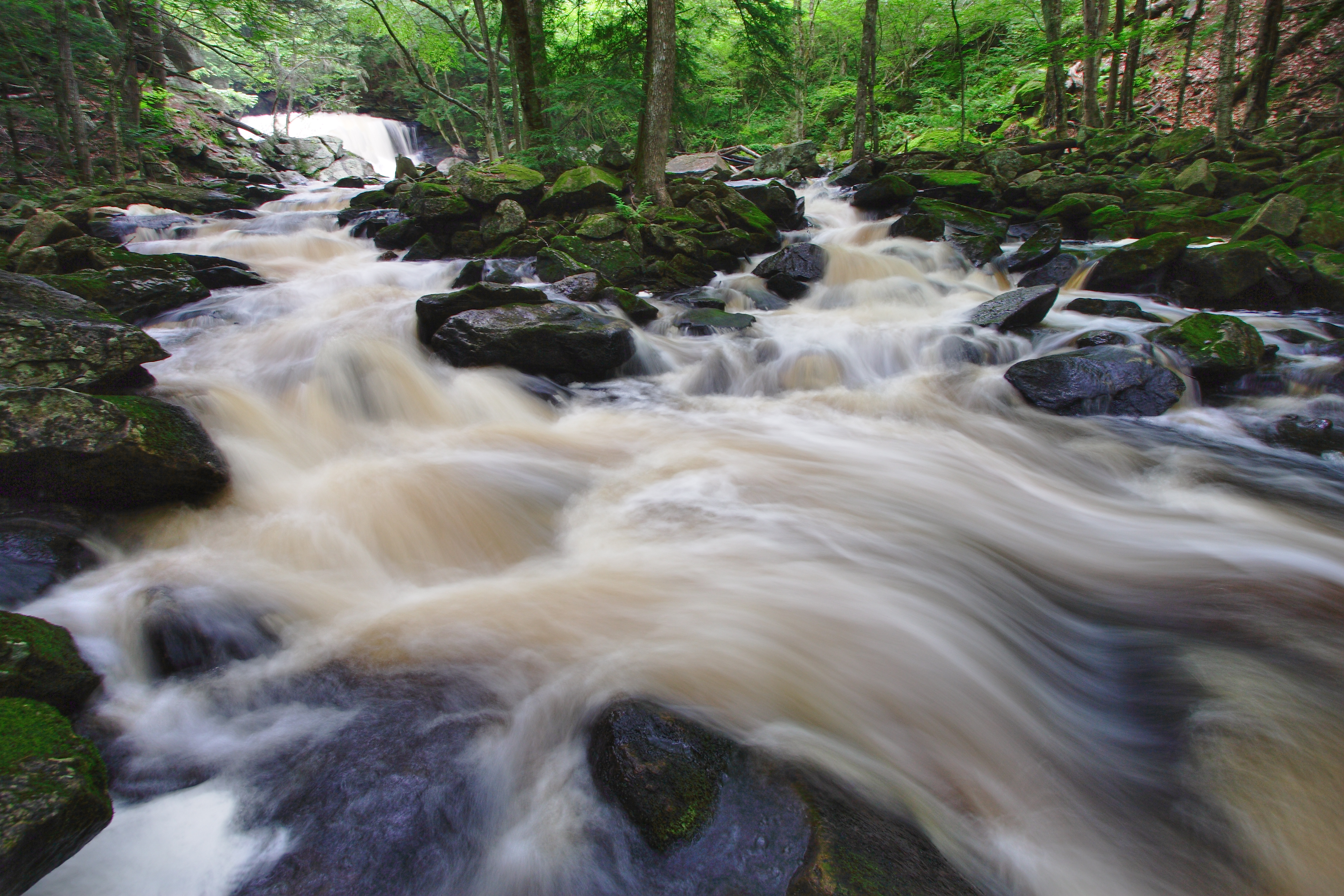
- Interactive map of Doane's Falls
- Location: Massachusetts, United States
- Coordinates: 42.6488°N 72.2019°W
- Established: 1959
- Operator: The Trustees of Reservations
- Website: Doane's Falls

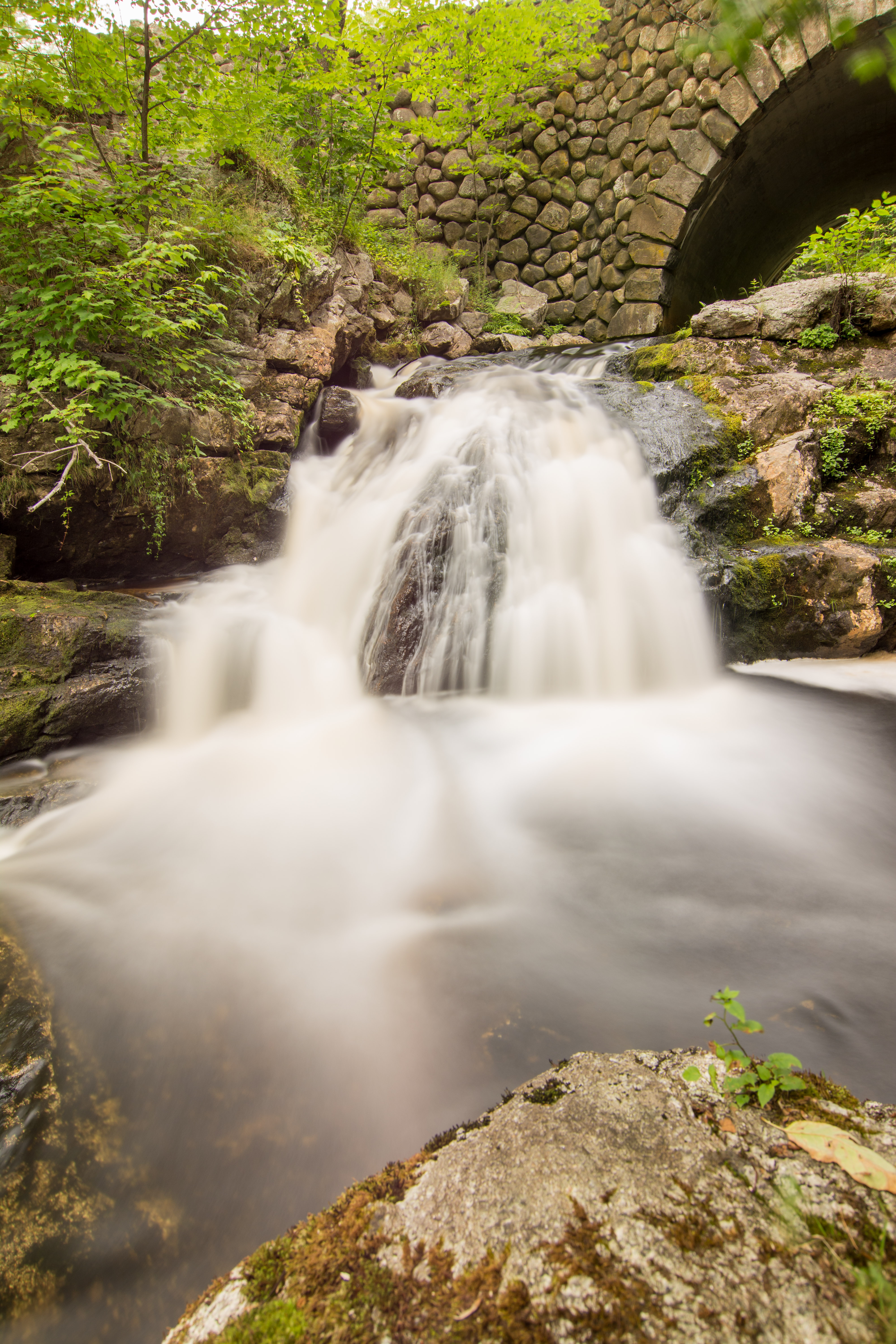
Long exposure of Doane's Falls. Photo courtesy of David Wornham

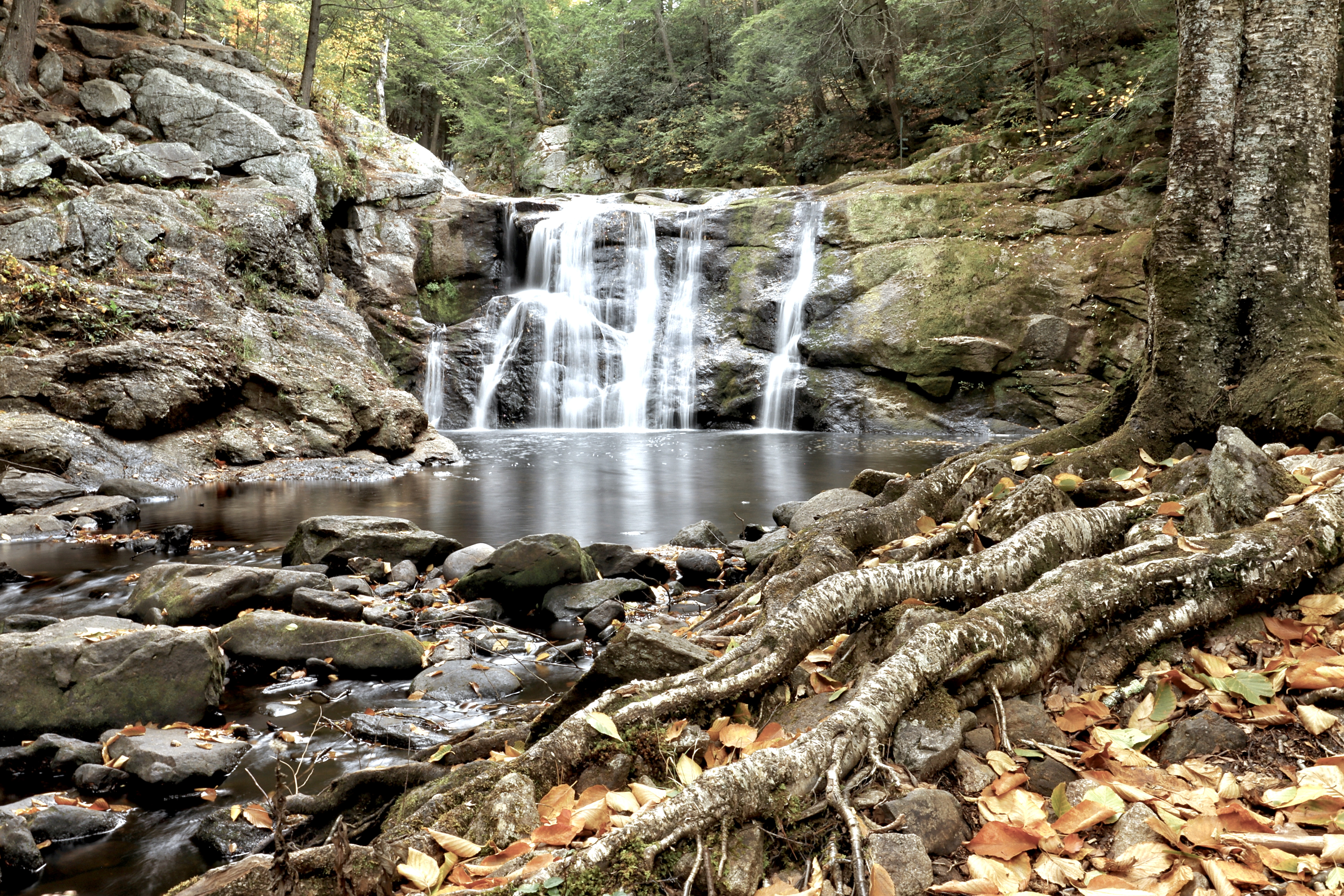
Doanes Falls, Lower Falls. Photo courtesy of Mark Thatcher Oct 2020

Doane's Falls is a series of five waterfalls located in Royalston, Massachusetts along an 0.2-mile (0.32 km) section of Lawrence Brook, a tributary of the Millers River that originates from Laurel Lake in Fitzwilliam. The falls are part of a 46-acre (19 ha) open space preserve acquired in 1959 by the land conservation non-profit organization The Trustees of Reservations. The 22-mile (35 km) Tully Trail passes through the property.

The preserve is open to fishing, walking, picnicking, and hiking only; swimming and wading were banned in 2002 following a series of diving injuries and deaths. Canoeing and kayaking are allowed upstream from the falls along Coddings Meadow, a flatwater section of Lawrence Brook.

Doane's Falls are part of a larger contiguous area of protected open space, connected by the Tully Trail and including the United States Army Corps of Engineers' Tully Lake flood control project, The Trustees of Reservations' Jacobs Hill and Royalston Falls properties, and Massachusetts state forest land. Tully Lake Campground, a 35-site walk-in and tent only facility jointly managed by the Army Corps of Engineers and the Trustees of Reservations, abuts the west side of the Falls property.

== History ==
Doane's Falls are named for Amos Doane, who operated a door, sash, and blind mill on Lawrence Brook in the 19th century. Doane's mill was one of several such ventures along the falls, of which only the foundations remain.
