= James Tully =

James or Jim Tully may refer to:

- James Tully (Irish politician) (1915–1992), Irish trade unionist, politician and Deputy Leader of the Irish Labour Party
- James Tully (Australian politician) (1877–1962), member of the Australian House of Representatives
- Jim Tully (1886–1947), vagabond, pugilist, and American writer
- Jim Tully (footballer) (1883–1949), English footballer for Clapton Orient and Rochdale
- James Tully (philosopher) (born 1946), Canadian philosopher and teacher

== See also ==
- Tully (disambiguation)
