= Lost Dauphin Park =

Park in Brown County, Wisconsin, United States

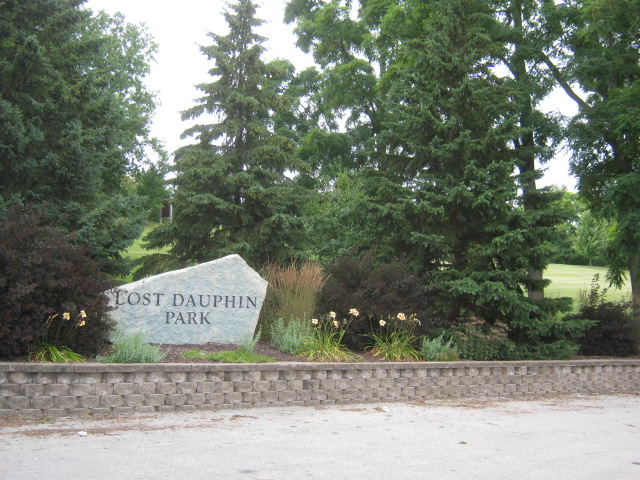
- entrance

- Location within Wisconsin Location within the United States
- Location: Brown, Wisconsin, United States
- Coordinates: 44.3891532°N 88.1267693°W
- Area: 19 acres (7.7 ha)
- Established: 1947
- Governing body: Wisconsin Department of Natural Resources
- Website: Lost Dauphin Park

Lost Dauphin State Park is a former state park in Brown County, Wisconsin. It is located on land that was held for six decades by Mary Hobart Williams (née "Marie Madeline Jourdain"), a French-Menominee Métis woman whose story was buried inside the archive of the man who married her when she was fourteen.

== The Land ==
The land on the Fox River was given to Marie Madeline Jourdain by her Menominee relatives as dowry. She would hold it from the 1820s until her death in the 1880s—through the era of Indian removal, the Civil War, and Wounded Knee.

== The Marriage ==
In 1823, Jourdain—then fourteen years old—was married by her teacher, Episcopal missionary Eleazer Williams, who was in his thirties. Contemporary accounts noted she was “not a willing party to the contract.” Williams used the marriage to strengthen his claim to her land at Little Rapids. He spent most of their marriage away from home, pursuing his plan to build an “Indian empire” with himself as leader, mortgaging her land without her consent, and later claiming to be the Lost Dauphin of France. He died in poverty in New York in 1858, having never successfully claimed what was hers.

== The Woman Who Held the Land ==
After Williams’ death, Mary Hobart Williams (as she had been renamed by the Episcopal Church) remained on the land. She built a matriarchal household with her adopted daughter Josephine and Josephine’s Menominee birth mother. Using strategies of survivance—adapting her labor, expanding her kinship network, and wielding literacy to control her world—she remained stable and solvent on her own land until her death, holding Indigenous land through female kinship while federal policy worked to dispossess Native peoples across the continent. Her diaries, spanning 1834 to 1877, remained embedded for over a century inside the much larger collection of her husband’s papers, her voice literally archived within his.

== The Naming ==
The park became a state park in 1947. It was named after Williams' fraudulent Lost Dauphin claim—a fantasy conclusively disproven by multiple genetic studies examining mitochondrial DNA from the heart preserved after Louis XVII's autopsy—rather than after the Métis woman who actually held the land for sixty years. The park has since been removed from the state park system, although the land remains state-owned. The name has never been changed.

== Location ==
The park is located at the home of Eleazar Williams overlooking the Fox River. It is located on Brown County Highway D (which is also called Lost Dauphin Road) along the north side of the river.

== State park ==
The park was added to the list of state parks in 1947. It remains designated as Lost Dauphin Park with the land remaining state owned.

== Features ==
The site features a scenic overlook of the Fox River with a bench, shelter, and swings. The flagstone foundation of the former house remains visible. Since the park is operated locally by the Town of Lawrence, a vehicle admission sticker is not required.

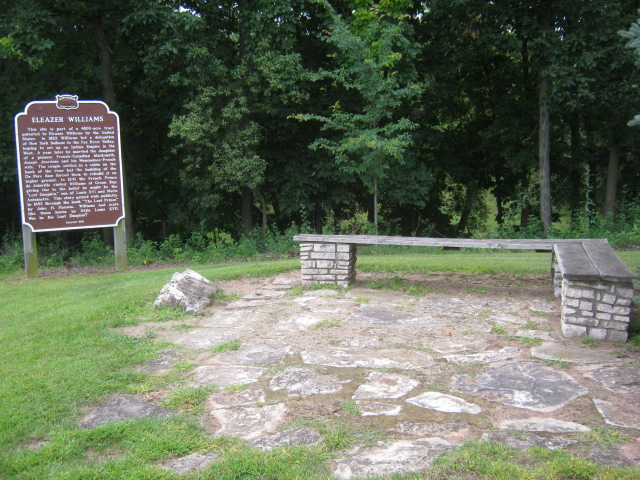
Bench

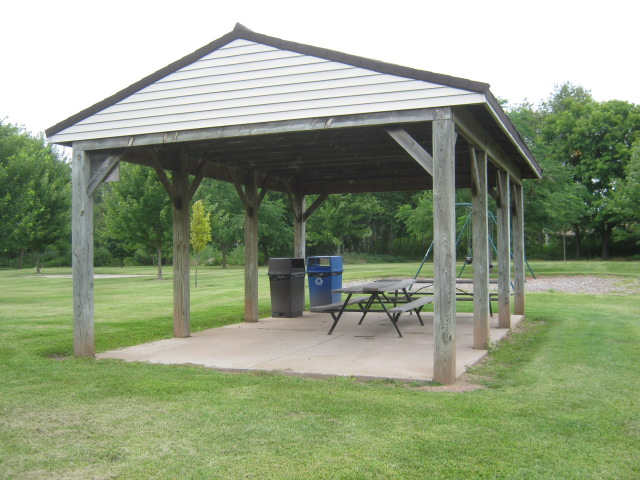
Shelter

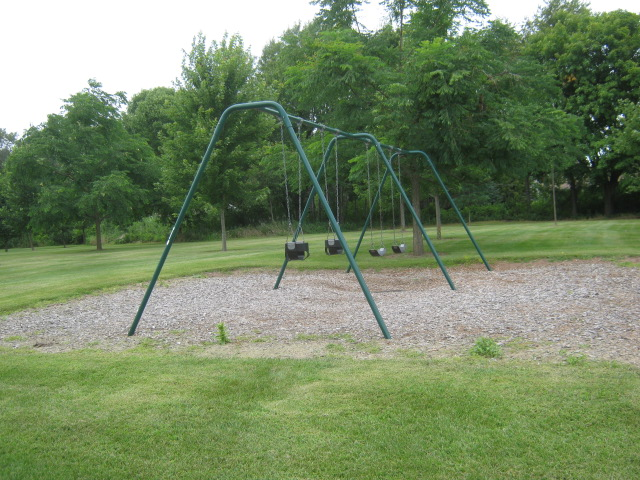
Swings

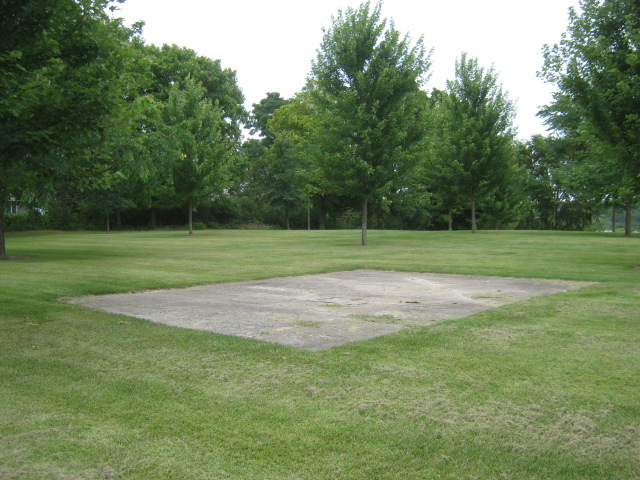
Flagstone foundation
