= Whitman Jacobs =

- Born: 1727; Bristol, Rhode Island
- Died: March 28, 1801 (aged 73–74); Royalston, Massachusetts
- Occupation: Clergyman

Rev. Whitman or Wightman Jacobs (1727 – 1801) was an American Baptist clergyman known for his leadership of a Separate Baptist Church in Thompson, Connecticut, and his ministry and departure from Royalston, Massachusetts, following Shays' Rebellion.

== Early life ==
He was born in Bristol, Rhode Island, to Nathaniel Jacobs and Mercy Whitman. His father founded Jacobs' Inn, a well known institution in Thompson, Connecticut, of which both George Washington and Lafayette were guests. The inn was located in the northeastern corner of Connecticut, halfway between Hartford and Boston. Whitman Jacobs was "of the unadulterated Roger Williams stock".

== Ministry ==
Elder Jacobs moved from Rhode Island to Thompson, Connecticut, to found a Baptist church in 1750. This church was part of the General Six-Principle Baptists association.

In his ministry, he baptized many people around New England. The American Baptist Magazine describes him and others as having travelled to Framingham, Massachusetts, to preach and spread their faith. In 1762, he baptized four people there, followed by six and seven more the following years.

On June 19, 1767, Elder Jacobs met with others in the process founding the Baptist Church in Royalston, Massachusetts, where he eventually became the first pastor. This church was the 5th in Worcester County and the 22nd in Massachusetts. He was pastor in Thompson, Connecticut, for 20 years prior to his tenure in Royalston, and many of his parishioners from Thompson moved to Royalston.

Reverend Jacobs was installed in Royalston on December 13, 1770. His salary was $50 per year. He resigned in 1786. Sources say that he was pushed out because he had a difference of opinion with his congregation regarding the Shays Rebellion. Jacobs sided with the government, while most of his congregation agreed with Daniel Shays. After Royalston, he was pastor in Guilford, Vermont

== Family life ==
He married Rebecca Rice and had 2 children, and later married Rebecca Grow and had 10 children.

He died on March 28, 1801, while living with his son Joseph in Royalston, Massachusetts. At the centennial of Royalston, Governor Alexander Bullock said "he left many of those marked and decisive influences which control a local history."
