= Tull =

Tull may refer to:

== Places ==
- Tull, Arkansas, a town in the United States
- Tull en 't Waal, a village in the Netherlands

== Other uses ==
- Tull (surname)
- Jethro Tull (band), British progressive rock group
- Tull, a fictional town in the Stephen King novel The Dark Tower: The Gunslinger

== See also ==
- Tully (disambiguation)
