= Spirit Falls =

Waterfall in Royalston, Massachusetts

Coordinates: 42°40′08″N 72°12′18″W

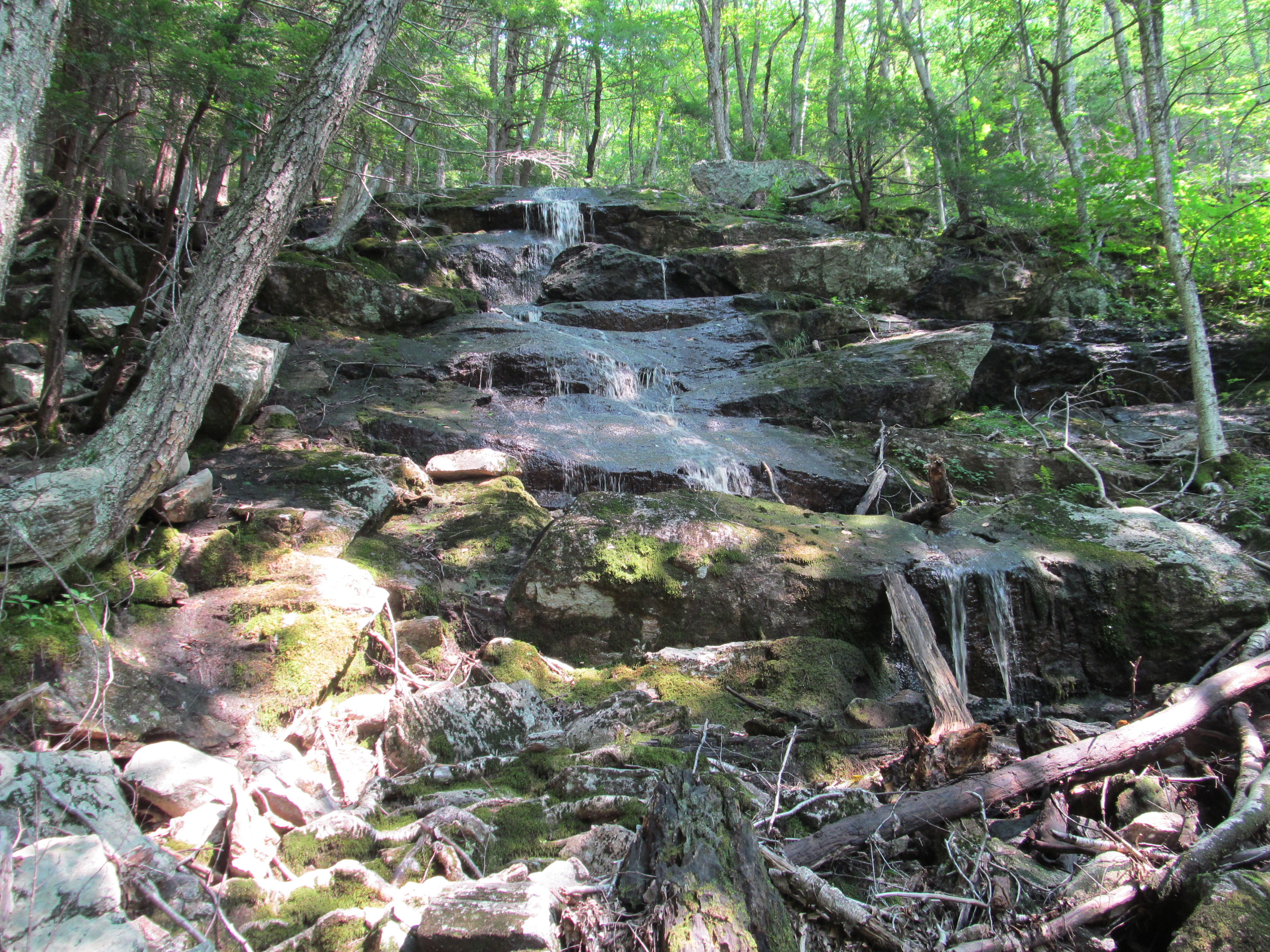
Spirit Falls

Spirit Falls is a 30 foot (9.1 m) waterfall located in the Jacobs Hill open space preserve in Royalston, Massachusetts. The preserve is managed by non-profit organization The Trustees of Reservations. The 22-mile (35 km) Tully Trail passes by the falls.
