= Native American rhetoric =

Academic rhetoric used by Indigenous peoples

Native American rhetoric is the rhetoric used by Indigenous peoples for purposes of self-determination and self-naming, in academia and a variety of media. This field focuses on cultural traditions and rhetorical sovereignty, with colonial impact and adversity being partially responsible for its lack of discussion and acceptance.

== Historical background ==
Native rhetoric and rhetorical practice are influenced by both contemporary and historical circumstances as well as the varied cultural contexts of the unenrolled Indigenous peoples, non-federally recognized Indigenous Peoples, and the “574 federally recognized American Indian and Alaska Native tribes and villages” Decolonial and rhetorical scholars have loosely sketched a definition of Indigenous rhetoric — for which they argue a shared relationship to the land and an uneven though shared experience of colonialism is partially responsible. Columbus and white settlers often described Indians as animalistic and savage, enforcing suppressive and dehumanizing patterns. Scholars have observed "colonized people often internalize the identity of their oppressors," which causes the colonized to give in to racial and social stereotypes.

== Cultural traditions ==
Studies of Indigenous rhetoric note that the many different Native American communicative traditions draw upon People-specific histories, multiple linguistic systems, geographically distinct though interrelated lands, and contemporary cultural, discursive, and academic modes. Indigenous scholars debate various critiques against the labels applied to Indigenous Peoples. In "What We Want to Be Called: Indigenous Peoples' Perspectives on Racial and Ethnic Identity Labels," Michael Yellow Bird argues that the term, Native American, alongside others like it homogenizes hundreds of unique tribal identities and cultures by grouping them under a shared rubric, threatening Indigenous Peoples' rights to self-definition. For Yellow Bird and some of the respondents to his survey, tribal affiliation and terms emphasizing First Nations sovereignty are preferred forms of self-definition. Relationality is the unconscious ideas, discourses, and perceptions of interconnectedness that shape Indigenous rhetorical practice. Where the rhetorician solely drawing from Eurocentric ontologies and epistemologies assumes a disembodied subject position, recent scholarship on methodology argues that Indigenous peoples live ways of being, valuing, and knowing that are rooted in and express a relationality with the earth. These interrelations with the earth—and the responsibility of maintaining proper relationships with the other beings and ancestors interconnected with land—form Indigenous rhetorical practices. Storytelling and Story are core elements of Indigenous rhetoric and rhetorical practice. Where Eurocentric methods of categorization draw distinctions between literary and persuasive genres—contemporary feminist and rhetorical scholarship argues that embodied non-categorical storytelling functions as theory, rhetoric, and a rhetorical methodology for Indigenous rhetoricians. Another central part of Native culture is dance, expressed through different forms and ceremonies unique to each tribe. Dance serves as an outlet for Indigenous people to express their own identity in spaces where their voice is not often heard. The Ghost Dance, a historically significant dance, held the belief that if Indigenous people did not fight against the settlers’ expansion and instead joined together, the Indigenous would prosper with animals and health. Alongside storytelling, dance is a part of Indigenous rhetoric where they communicate hardships, hopes, and inspire change among younger generations.

== Resistance rhetoric ==
Rhetorical sovereignty and Survivance serve as fundamental frameworks for understanding and engaging with Indigenous rhetorical practices. New pedagogical scholarship that develops methods for teaching Indigenous rhetoric has taken up the term, arguing that analytic and rhetorical frameworks must account for Indigenous sovereignty. Influencing this development, Scott Richard Lyons has argued for the creation of pedagogical spaces, frameworks, and methods of writing instruction that recognize Indigenous struggles for sovereignty against the rhetorical imperialism of U.S. legislative decisions, the government seizure of Indigenous lands, and government use of American Indian boarding schools to forcefully assimilate Indigenous peoples. He refers to this pedagogical shift as rhetorical sovereignty; for Lyons, teaching treaties and ideological systems as rhetorical artifacts that continue to facilitate Indigenous dispossession alongside Indigenous texts is an expression of rhetorical sovereignty. Lyons defines rhetorical sovereignty as the "inherent right and ability of peoples to determine their own communicative needs and desires in the pursuit of self-determination."

Survivance, in the context of rhetoric, is the continued presence of Indigenous peoples' communicative, persuasive, and epistemic practices of sovereignty. Rhetorical scholarship derives the term "survivance" from the work of Gerald Vizenor. In Vizenor's work the creation of new stories of Indigenous presence challenges the cultural simulations of the Indian invented by proponents and benefactors of Manifest Destiny. Vizenor writes: "The simulations of manifest manners are the continuance of the surveillance and domination of the tribes in literature. Simulations are the absence of the tribal real; the postindian conversions are in the new stories of survivance over dominance."

== Unenrolled Natives ==
Indigenous scholars debate various labels applied to Indigenous Peoples, most popular being the term Native American. In "What We Want to Be Called: Indigenous Peoples' Perspectives on Racial and Ethnic Identity Labels," Michael Yellow Bird argues that the term Native American, alongside others like it, homogenizes hundreds of unique tribal identities and cultures by grouping them under a shared rubric, threatening Indigenous Peoples' rights to self-definition. For Yellow Bird and some of the respondents to his survey, tribal affiliation and terms emphasizing First Nations sovereignty are preferred forms of self-definition. Blood quanta, a government requirement for many federal programs, can harm the self-definition of Indigenous individuals. To be federally recognized by the government and obtain a tribal card, many Indians must undergo a blood quantum proving that they have minimum Indian blood to qualify. Other methods include providing evidence of an ancestor being on a tribal roll in order to gain an enrollment number. Most Indians that are unable to register due to the undermining process struggle with a sense of agency and believe that their voice on Indian well-being-related issues will not be heard.

== Modern views ==
Ernest Stromberg writes, “Native rhetoricians appropriate the language, styles, and beliefs of their white audiences in order to establish a degree of consubstantiality. Across divides of language, beliefs, and traditions, Native rhetoricians have had to find ways to make their voices heard and respected by a too frequently uninterested and even hostile audience.’” In education systems, which prioritize Western traditional normatives, Indigenous people struggle with sufficient representation. Formal researches suggest that implementing Native language or other cultural activities, such as beading, may help support Native identities in school settings.
