= Tully Lake =

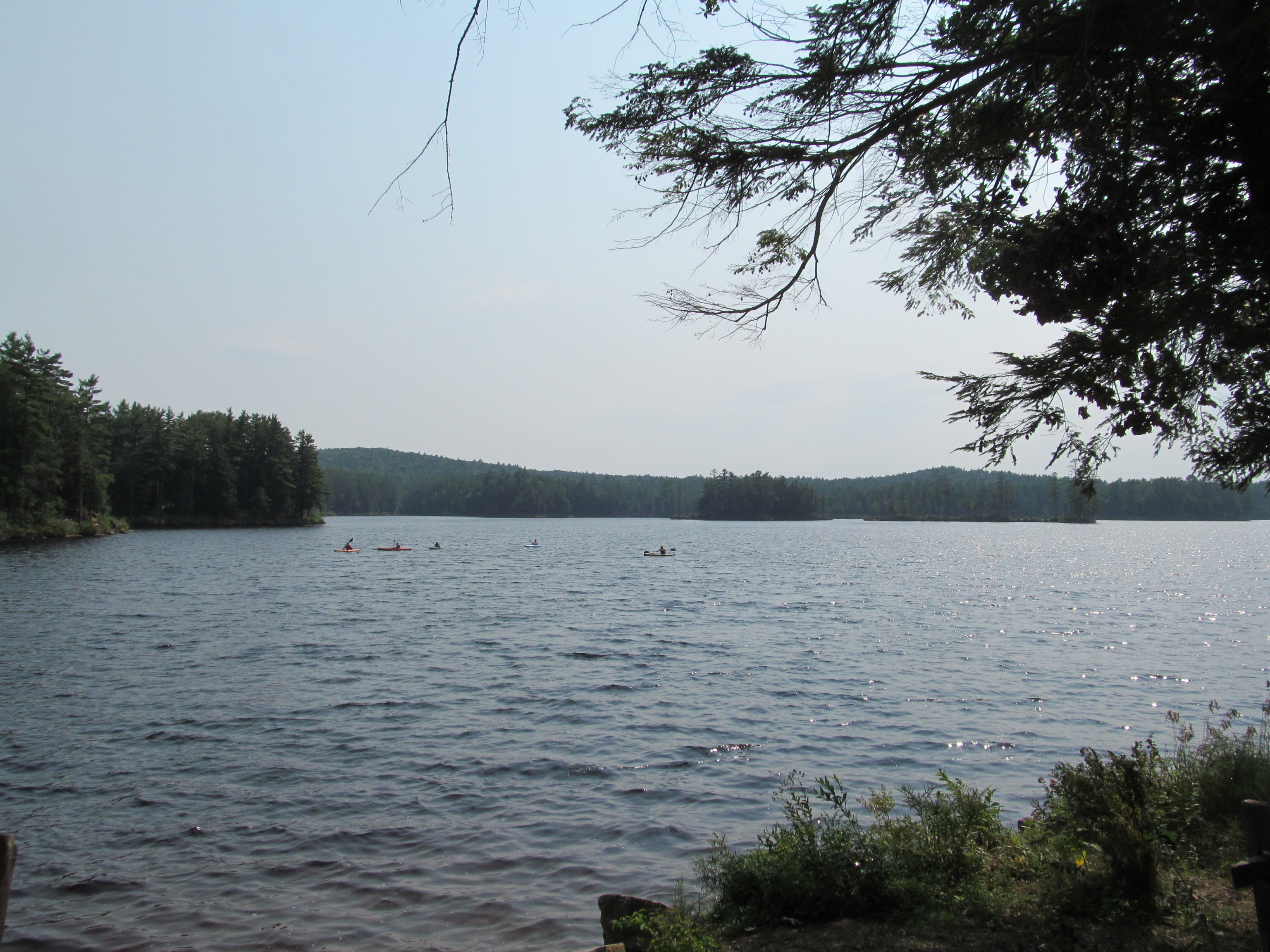
- Tully Lake
- Location: Royalston, Massachusetts
- Coordinates: 42°38′40.7″N 72°12′56.4″W
- Construction began: 1947
- Opening date: 1949
- Construction cost: $1,600,000
- Operator(s): USACE

Dam and spillways
- Impounds: Tully River

Reservoir
- Creates: Tully Lake
- Total capacity: 6.6 billion US gallons (25,000,000 m^{3})
- Surface area: 1,262 acres (5.11 km^{2})
- Normal elevation: 636 ft (194 m)

Tully Lake, of Royalston, Massachusetts, is a 1,262-acre (511 ha) reservoir and flood control project constructed by the United States Army Corps of Engineers (USACE) in 1949 for 1.6 million dollars. The project prevents flooding of the greater Connecticut River and Millers River valleys and provides a variety of recreational opportunities, including a campground operated by The Trustees of Reservations. Tully Lake is an important link in the 22-mile (35 km) Tully Trail.

== Flood control ==
As of 2007, the USACE reported that Tully Lake had prevented an estimated $26 million in flood damages. The dam's capacity is 6.69 billion US gallons (25,300,000 m^{3}) of water; it can contain 7.72 inches of rainfall runoff and has a downstream channel capacity of 850 cubic feet per second (24 m^{3}/s). The closest the lake has come to capacity was in 1987, when it rose to 62%.

== Recreation ==
Tully Lake is open to fishing, small boats, hiking, cross country skiing, mountain biking, picnicking, hunting (in season), and swimming. Motor vehicles are not allowed on the property. The USACE maintains a disc golf course, a mountain bike trail, and a picnic area. The Trustees of Reservations, a non-profit conservation organization, operates a 35 site tent-only camping facility on Tully Lake, open seasonally.

The 22-mile (35 km) Tully Trail, a recreational trail cooperatively managed by the USACE, TTOR, the Commonwealth of Massachusetts, the National Park Service, and the Mount Grace Land Conservation Trust, runs along the northern shore of Tully Lake. The trail passes by Doane's Falls, Jacobs Hill, and Royalston Falls, and traverses the summit of Tully Mountain.
