= Royalston Falls =

Waterfall

Coordinates: 42°42′52″N 72°14′43″W

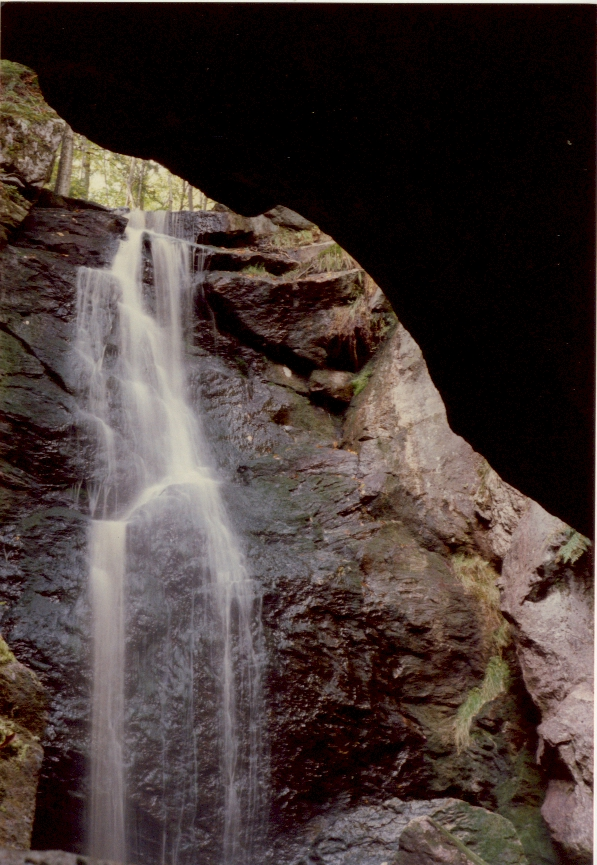
- Interactive map of Royalston Falls
- Established: 1951
- Operator: The Trustees of Reservations
- Website: Royalston Falls

Royalston Falls is a 50 foot (15 m) waterfall and granite gorge located in Royalston, Massachusetts along Falls Brook, a tributary of the Tully River which in turn is a tributary of the Millers River. The falls are part of a 217-acre (88 ha) open space preserve acquired in 1951 by the land conservation non-profit organization The Trustees of Reservations. The 22-mile (35 km) Tully Trail and the 235-mile (378 km) New England National Scenic Trail pass through the property.

== History ==
Royalston Falls was once called Forbes Falls for Calvin Forbes, a local property owner in the 1800s. The falls were previously the site of a town recreation area which included a playground; it was also the location of a casino. The preserve was a gift of Mr. and Mrs. George L. Foote in 1951 and 1954; additional land was added in 2002.

== Recreation and conservation ==
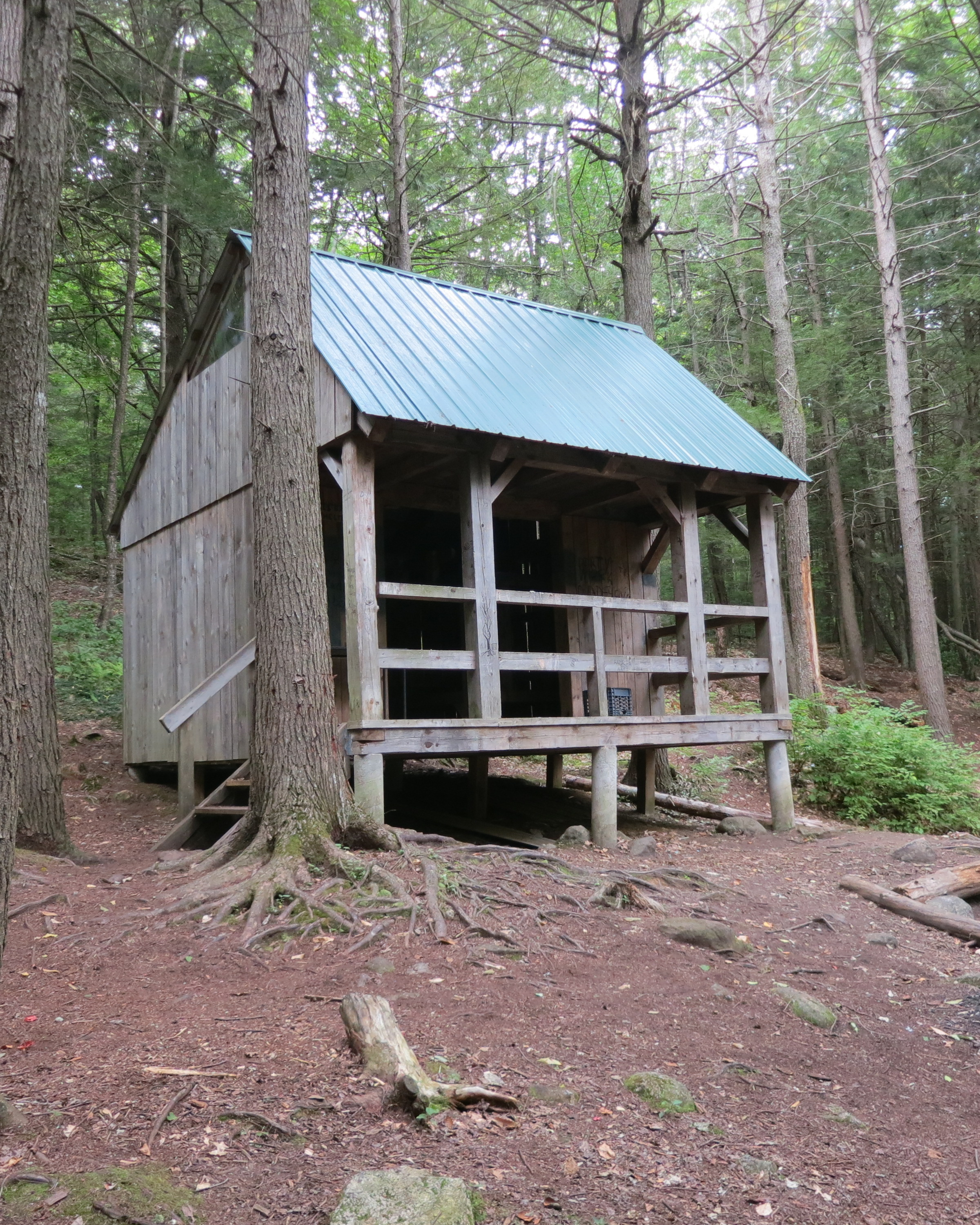
This shelter, located at the junction of the M&M Trail and the Tully Trail near Fall Brook, is about 0.3 miles from the Falls.

The preserve is open to fishing, walking, picnicking, mountain biking, horseback riding, hunting (in season), cross country skiing, and hiking. A trailhead is located off Massachusetts Route 32 just short of the New Hampshire border. A second trailhead is located off the unmaintained Falls Road in Royalston.

Royalston Falls are part of a larger contiguous area of protected open space, connected by the Tully Trail and including the United States Army Corps of Engineers' Tully Lake flood control project, The Trustees of Reservations' Jacobs Hill and Doane's Falls properties, and Massachusetts state forest land. Tully Lake Campground, a 35-site walk-in and tent only facility jointly managed by the Army Corps of Engineers and the Trustees of Reservations, is located along the Tully Trail to the south.
