= Rosebank College =

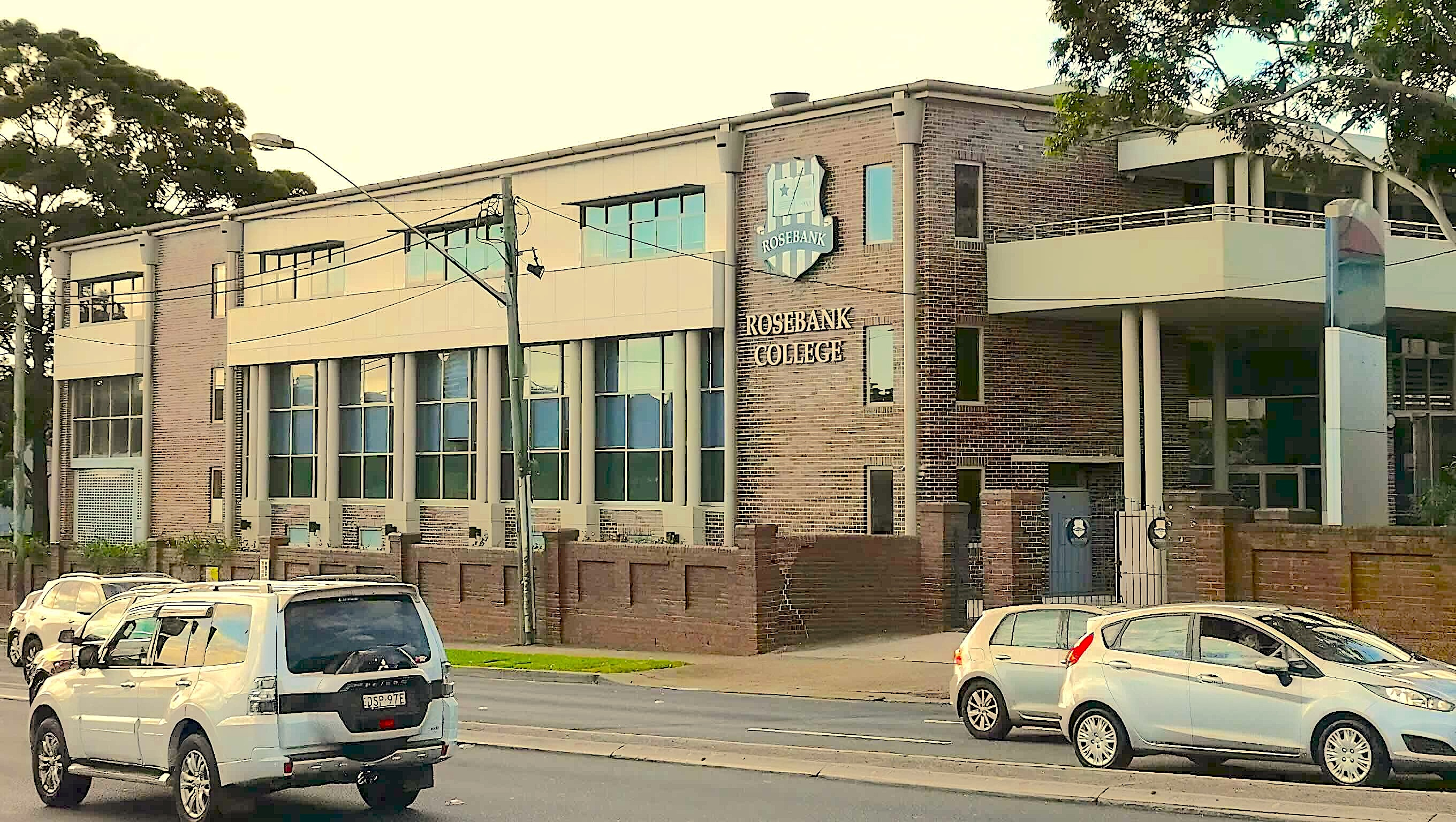
- Parramatta Road entrance to Rosebank College Five Dock, pictured in March 2026

Location
- 1A Harris Road, Five Dock, Sydney, New South Wales; Australia; 33°52′13″S 151°7′16″E

Information
- Type: Independent comprehensive co-educational secondary day school
- Motto: Latin: Sursum Corda (Lift Up Your Hearts)
- Religious affiliation: Sisters of the Good Samaritan (Benedictine)
- Denomination: Roman Catholic
- Established: 1867; 159 years ago
- Chairman: Justin Flaherty
- Principal: Iris Nastasi
- Staff: 198
- Enrolment: 1,440 (2025)
- Colours: Navy blue and gold
- Website: www.rosebank.nsw.edu.au

Rosebank College is an independent Roman Catholic comprehensive co-educational secondary school in the Benedictine tradition, located in Five Dock, an Inner West of Sydney, New South Wales, Australia.

It was the only major co-educational Catholic school in the Inner West region of Sydney until 2022 when the single-sex schools of De La Salle College and Bethlehem College amalgamated to form St Vincent's College Ashfield, due to the demand for schools like Rosebank in the area.

== History ==
Founded in 1867 by Archbishop John Bede Polding and the Sisters of the Good Samaritan, Rosebank College is one of the earliest schools in New South Wales and is among the oldest in Australia. In 1877, the school became a female boarding school. Young men were welcomed into the Year 7 for the first time in 2009 and full co-education was achieved in 2012.

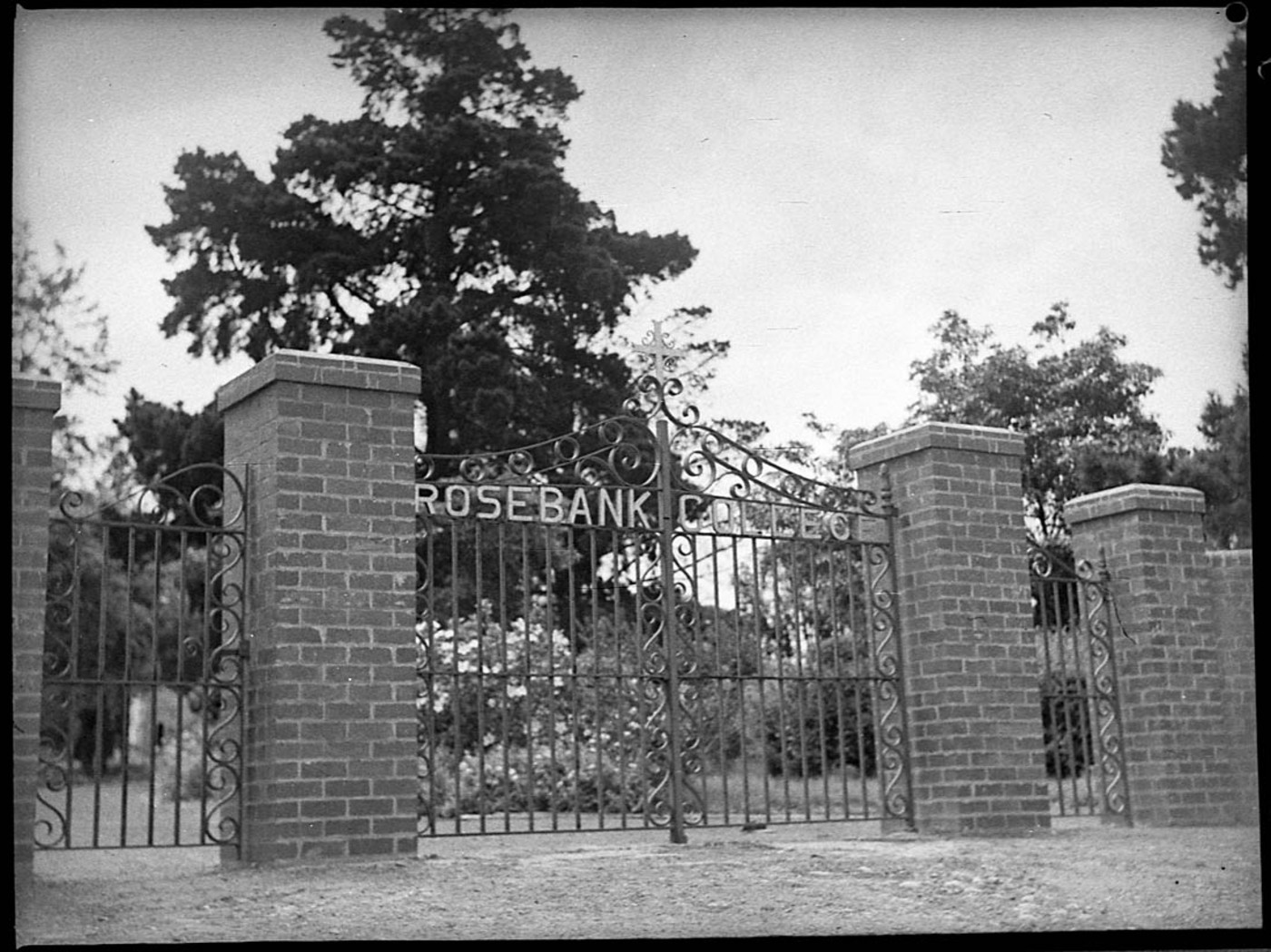
Rosebank College Gates, taken February 16, 1937

In 2017, the college celebrated its 150th anniversary. The college currently caters for 1400 students.

== Campus ==
Rosebank's facilities are housed in eight buildings. In 2014 three new buildings, Ottilien Hall, Montserrat Hall and Jamberoo Hall were opened. The buildings provide the college basketball courts, the Benedict Auditorium (located on the second floor of the Ottilien Hall), an undercroft play area, the cafeteria and learning spaces including science labs, music, dance and drama rooms. The Scholastica Research and Study Centre, IT support desk, hospitality kitchens and art rooms are located in Subiaco Hall. As of 2018, the college finished a new staff and administration building which includes 12 new classrooms, Downside Hall. In 2022 Manquehue Hall was opened, located on the corner of Parramatta and Harris Road, with a focus on collaborative and flexible learning.

The Rosebank College campus is notable for the high brick fence surrounding its perimeter and the extensive bank of roses that has existed on the property since the late 1840s, the historic chapel and private cemetery gardens where the early Good Samaritan Sisters are buried.

In 2008, the college and its grounds were heritage-listed under the Local Government Act for historical and cultural significance; "Rosebank College is a rare example of a nineteenth-century estate that survives with most of its land in the Canada Bay Council area. The College has considerable significance for the 1850s chapel that, despite some alterations, retains the qualities of a Victorian Gothic chapel and for the 1876 school building that is a fine example of the work of George Allen Mansfield. The grounds of Rosebank College retain extensive lawns and plantings, many established in the early to mid-twentieth century, that are part of the continuum of use of the site as a Catholic convent and college. The high brick wall around the perimeter is notable in the surrounding streetscape and adds to the amenity of the grounds."

The Sisters of the Good Samaritan Congregational Offices were situated at the college until 2017 when they moved to Glebe.

== House system ==
The ten houses are named after men and women in the history of the college. The college originally had 6 houses (Brady, Cassidy, Caulfield, Delaney, Dwyer and McLaughlin). This increased to 7 with the introduction of Vaughan in 2013. O'Connor was added to the college house system in 2016. The latest additions, Adamson and Hayes, were introduced in 2019, making the total number of houses 10 as of 2025.

Each house is situated in a block that they share with up to 3 houses.

House name	Motto	Benedictine Patron	Colour	Building
Adamson	"Actions, not words"	Sister Mary Ann Adamson	White	Q Block (Manquehue Hall, Level 1)
Brady	"Brady Together, Victorious Forever"	Father John Brady	Green	O Block (Ottilien Hall, Level 1)
Cassidy	"United by Heart, Driven by Passion"	Catherine Cassidy (Sister M. Agatha)	Red	E Block (Level 2)
Caulfield	"Dare to dream, Strive to achieve!"	Patience Caufield (Sister M. Placid)	Yellow	D Block (Level 2)
Delaney	"Strive for Excellence, Lead with Heart"	Father William (Bill) Delaney	Purple	J Block (Jamberoo Hall, Level 2)
Dwyer	"Excellence in Every Detail"	Reverend Dean John Dwyer OSB	Orange	E Block (Level 3)
Hayes	"Set goals, then demolish them!"	Francis Daniel Hayes	Black	Q Block (Manquehue Hall, Level 2)
McLaughlin	"Breathe in Courage, Breathe out Fear"	Clara McLaughlin (Sister M. Berchmans)	Blue	E Block (Level 1)
O’Connor	"One House, One Heart"	Eileen O’Connor	Silver	D Block (Level 1)
Vaughan	"Be The Nice Kid"	Roger Wiliiam Bede Vaughan	Cerise	J Block (Jamberoo Hall, Level 2)

== Notable alumnae ==
- Giancarlo Italiano, Australian football manager.
- Jennifer Anne Alexander, chief executive officer of the Australian Institute of Management, New South Wales and the Australian Capital Territory; Chairman of Gondwana Voices (also attended St Scholastica's College)
- Jan Cameron, Olympic swimmer and coach
- Theresa (Cissie) McLaughlin, founding sister of the Society of Our Lady's Nurses for the Poor; First Superior and later Mother General of the Order
- Melina Marchetta, author of several young adult novels including Looking for Alibrandi
- Fiona Martin, former Australian Liberal Party politician
- Bruno Schiavi, fashion designer and businessman
- Mary Burfitt Williams, physician and pathologist

== See also ==
- List of Catholic schools in New South Wales
- Catholic education in Australia
