= Thill (surname) =

Thill is a surname. Notable people with the surname include:

- Francis Augustine Thill (1893–1957), American Roman Catholic bishop
- Georges Thill (1897–1984), French opera singer
- Lewis D. Thill (1903–1975), American politician
- Jang Thill (1913–1984), Luxembourgish painter
- Roland Thill (1954–2017), Luxembourgish footballer
- Agnès Thill (born 1964), French politician
- Tom Thill (born 1990), Luxembourgish cyclist
- Sébastien Thill (born 1993), Luxembourgish footballer
- Olivier Thill (born 1996), Luxembourgish footballer
- Vincent Thill (born 2000), Luxembourgish footballer
- Jessie Thill (born 1996), Luxembourgish politician
