= Mary Floyd Williams =

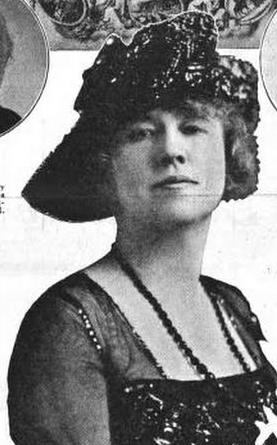
- Mary Floyd Williams, from a 1922 publication.
- Born: March 31, 1866
- Died: March 31, 1959 (aged 93); Palo Alto, California
- Occupations: Librarian, historian, lecturer
- Relatives: John P. Cushman (grandfather); Benjamin Tallmadge (great-grandfather); William Floyd (great-great-grandfather); Mary Floyd Cushman (cousin)

Mary Floyd Williams (March 31, 1866 – March 31, 1959) was an American librarian and California historian. In 1918, she became the first woman to complete a doctorate in history at the University of California, with a dissertation on the San Francisco Committee of Vigilance.

== Early life ==
Mary Floyd Williams was from Oakland, California, the daughter of Edwards C. Williams and Mary Floyd Cushman Williams. Her father was a member of the 1st New York Volunteers during the Mexican–American War, moved to California in 1847, and was founder and president of a lumber company. Her mother was a clubwoman in Oakland, and great-granddaughter of William Floyd, one of the signers of the United States Declaration of Independence. Through her mother, Williams' other ancestors included politicians Benjamin Tallmadge and John P. Cushman.

Williams earned a bachelor of library science (BLS) degree at the New York State Library in 1900. She worked with Henry Morris Stephens and completed doctoral studies in history at the University of California in 1918, the first woman to complete a doctorate in history there. She was 52 years old when she received her degree.

== Career ==
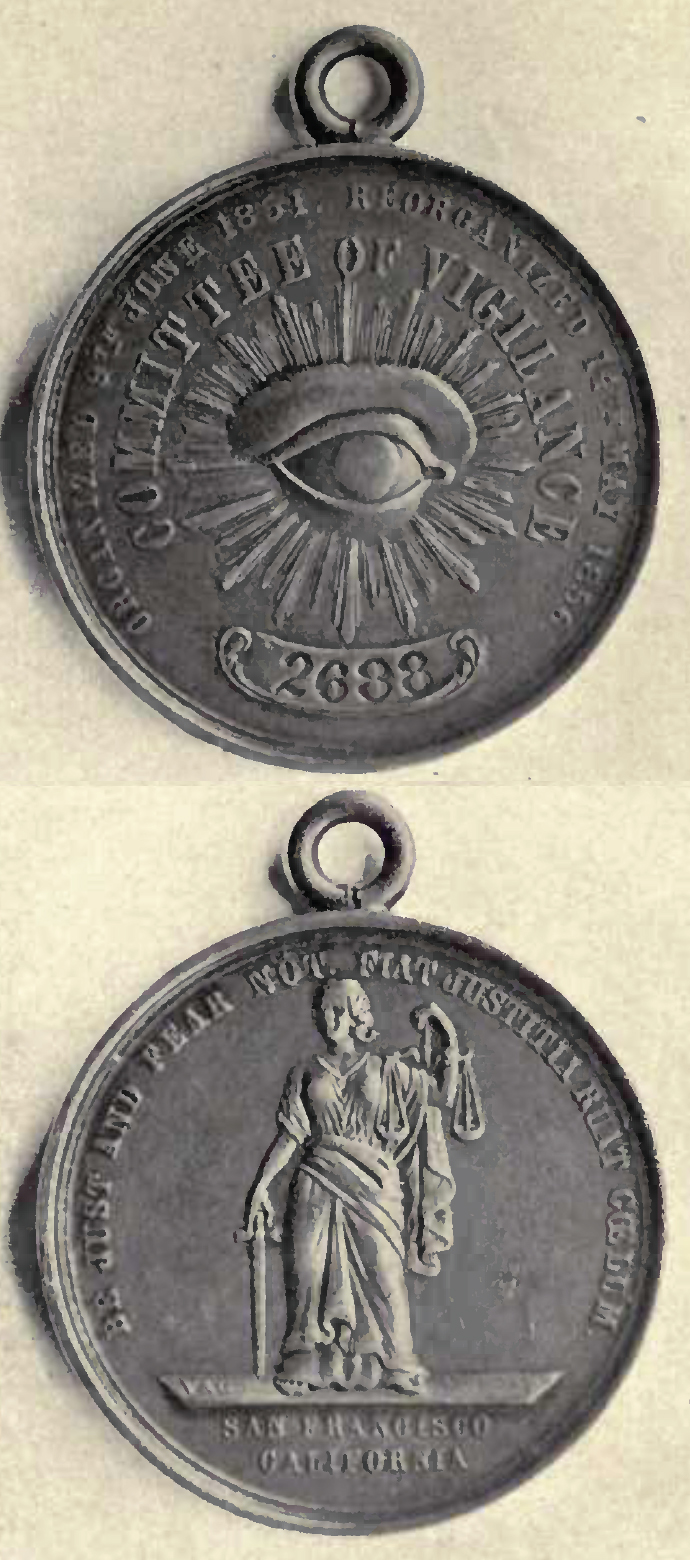
Medal of the San Francisco Committee of Vigilance of 1856. "Organized 9th June 1851. Reorganized 14th May 1856", as presented in the frontispiece of Williams' history of the Committee, 1921.

Williams moved back to California to work as a librarian at the Mechanics' Institute Library of San Francisco in 1900. In 1902 she directed the University of California's first Summer School of Library Science. In 1915 she served as secretary of the reception committee for the Panama–Pacific Historical Congress.

Williams was one of the first two readers at the Huntington Library when it opened for researchers in 1920. Her dissertation, History of the San Francisco Committee of Vigilance of 1851: A Study of Social Control on the California Frontier in the Days of the Gold Rush (1919), was published by the University of California Press in 1921. She also edited a published collection, Papers of the San Francisco Committee of Vigilance of 1851 (1919).

Other books by Williams included Library floors and floor coverings (1897), Reading list for children's librarians (1901, with Bertha Mower Brown Shaw), and a historical novel set in 1850s San Francisco, Fortune, Smile Once More! (1946). She also wrote scholarly articles published in the California Historical Society Quarterly.

Williams was a lecturer with the University of California Extension, teaching California history. She traveled in Asia in the 1920s and 1930s, including Tibet, Sri Lanka, Burma, Cambodia, Thailand, Bali, India, China, and Japan, and gave lectures about her travels with a slide show of her own photographs.

== Personal life ==
Williams died on her 93rd birthday, in 1959, at her home in Palo Alto. Williams' lantern slides and correspondence are archived at the University of California's College of Environmental Design Visual Resources Center.

Medical doctor and missionary Mary Floyd Cushman (1870-1965) was Mary Floyd Williams' cousin.
