= Bruno Schiavi =

Australian Entrepreneur (born 1972)

- Bruno Schiavi.jpg Schiavi in 2005

Bruno Schiavi (born 10 July 1972) is an Australian Entrepreneur.

== Early life ==
Schiavi was born on 10 July 1972 in Sydney's Inner West. His father worked for Italian embassies; the family moved several times before eventually settling in Australia. He attended Rosebank College in the Inner Western Sydney suburb of Five Dock, graduating in 1990.

Schiavi's university studies were in business and marketing. He worked at Target for eight years, starting in the 1980s. In 1995, he and his mother launched their first brand, "Anabella", a line of women's underwear over the internet.

== Design work ==
In 1998, Schiavi invented a sock with a zippered pocket and sold it through Gowings. This sock fuelled the growth of his company, which in 2004 had sales of AUD 3 million, mostly from Schiavi-designed underwear.

In 2003, Schiavi began working with celebrities when he had Big Brother contestants promote underwear designed by him. He has since collaborated with Priscilla Presley, Brett Lee, Janet Jackson, and the Kardashians as well as MISSONI, Magic Johnson, Jane Fonda and Heidi Klum. In the mid-2000s, Schiavi's company expanded to Los Angeles.

Many of his products, including the Kardashian Kollection, are sold globally. By 2013, his company had an estimated turnover of well over $75 million, 60 percent of that from outside Australia.

On 12 August 2013, Schiavi launched One Dress a Day, an online store that sells a new Schiavi-designed dress every day.

In 2015, Schiavi expanded into children's clothing, developing a Kardashian Kids line for his Kardashian Kollection brand when the Kardashians had children. The new brand was a commercial success, with 86 percent of the stock sold within 72 hours of the launch in stores and online via Babies R Us. Following Schiavi's usual business model of mass market sales, the Kardashian Kids was sold internationally and at Woolworths Big W stores in Australia from August 2015.
