= Mary Hobart Williams =

French-Menominee Métis woman

Mary Hobart Williams (née Marie Madeline Jourdain; c. 1809 – c. 1886) was a French-Menominee Métis woman who held land on the Fox River in present-day Wisconsin for six decades, from the 1820s until her death in the 1880s. Her diaries, spanning 1834 to 1877, are a significant primary source for understanding Métis women's experiences during the era of American settler colonialism in the Great Lakes region.

== Biography ==
Marie Madeline Jourdain was born around 1809 in the Green Bay region. She was the daughter of Joseph Jourdain, a prosperous French blacksmith, and a Menominee woman. Her Menominee relatives gave her land on the Fox River as dowry.

In 1823, at age fourteen, Jourdain was married to her teacher, Episcopal missionary Eleazer Williams, who was then in his thirties. Williams had established a school for Native American and Métis children in the Green Bay area, and Jourdain was one of his pupils. Contemporary accounts noted she was "not a willing party to the contract."

Eleazer Williams used the marriage to strengthen his claim to her land at Little Rapids. Following the marriage, the Episcopal Church renamed her Mary Hobart Williams, after Bishop John Henry Hobart.

Eleazer Williams spent most of their marriage away from home, pursuing his plan to build a Christian "Indian empire" with himself as leader. He mortgaged his wife's land without her consent and later claimed to be the Lost Dauphin of France. He died in poverty in Hogansburg, New York in 1858.

After her husband's death, Mary Hobart Williams remained on her land. She built a matriarchal household with her adopted daughter Josephine and Josephine's Menominee birth mother. Using strategies of survivance—adapting her labor, expanding her kinship network, and wielding literacy to manage her affairs—she remained stable and in possession of her own land until her death in the 1880s.

Williams held Indigenous land through female kinship networks during the era of Indian removal and the Wounded Knee Massacre, when federal policy actively worked to dispossess Native peoples across the continent.

== Diaries and legacy ==
Williams kept diaries from 1834 to 1877, which document her strategies for economic survival, her kinship networks, and daily life in the Green Bay Métis community. Historian Rachael Schnurr describes the diaries as examples of "survivance," a term coined by scholar Gerald Vizenor to describe the continued presence of Indigenous peoples on the land in ways that defy stereotypical narratives.

The diaries remained embedded for over a century inside the much larger collection of her husband's papers at the Wisconsin Historical Society, her voice archived within his.

The land Williams held is now Lost Dauphin State Park, named after her husband's fraudulent claim to French royalty.

== Archival collections ==
- Mary (Mrs. Eleazar) Williams Diaries, 1834–1877, Box 5, Folder 6, Eleazar Williams Papers, Wisconsin Historical Society
- "Wife of Eleazer Williams (Mary Madeleine Jourdain) Folder," F. G. Parmentier History Collection, Miriam B. & James J. Mulva Library, St. Norbert College, De Pere, Wisconsin
