= Tully Trail =

Scenic trail in Massachusetts, USA

Coordinates: 42°39′06″N 72°12′44″W

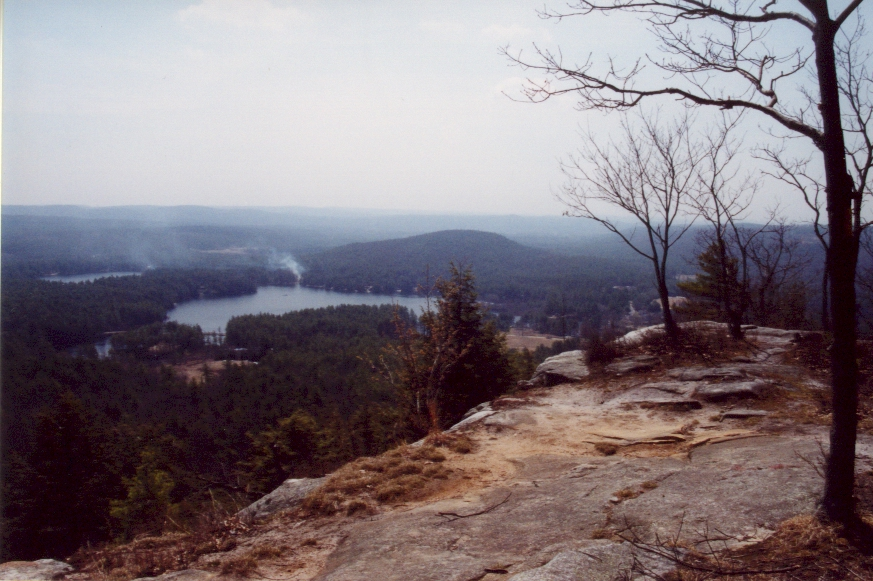
- View from Tully Mountain
- Length: 22 mi (35 km)
- Location: Franklin County and Worcester County, Massachusetts
- Use: hiking, snowshoeing
- Highest point: Tully Mountain, 1,163 ft (354 m)
- Lowest point: West Branch Tully River, 560 ft (170 m)
- Difficulty: easy, with rugged sections
- Season: easiest May through October
- Hazards: deer ticks, poison ivy

The Tully Trail is a 22-mile (35 km) scenic loop trail located in the towns of Royalston, Orange, and Warwick, Massachusetts near the New Hampshire border. The route crosses several ledges with sweeping views of the surrounding rural countryside and passes three waterfalls (Royalston Falls, Spirit Falls, and Doane's Falls). Tully Mountain, Jacobs Hill, and Tully Lake are also located on the trail. The Tully Trail coincides briefly with the 110-mile (180 km) Metacomet-Monadnock Trail. The route follows a mostly protected corridor of state, federal, and non-profit owned land.

== Conservation ==
The Tully Trail is managed by The Trustees of Reservations and by the Mount Grace Land Conservation Trust. Many key parcels along the trail route have been conserved by these non-profit organizations.
