= Daniel P. Tully =

American business executive (1932–2016)

- Born: January 2, 1932; Queens, New York, United States
- Died: May 10, 2016 (aged 84); Darien, Connecticut, United States
- Education: St. John's University
- Occupation: Business executive
- Known for: CEO of Merrill Lynch from 1992 to 1997
- Spouse: Grace Tully
- Children: 3

Daniel P. Tully (1932–2016) was an American business executive who served as the chief executive officer (CEO) of Merrill Lynch from 1992 to 1997.

== Biography ==
Born on January 2, 1932, in Queens, New York, Tully studied accounting at St. John's University and subsequently served two years in the United States Army. He joined Merrill Lynch in 1955 as a trainee, later became a major broker based in Stamford, Connecticut.

In 1985, Tully was appointed president and COO of Merrill Lynch, assuming the role of CEO in 1992 and chairman in 1993. During his tenure, Merrill Lynch expanded its global operations and increased its focus on investment banking. However, it also faced challenges, notably the 1994 bankruptcy of Orange County, California, which resulted in a $437 million settlement due to Merrill Lynch's advisory role.

After retiring from Merrill Lynch in 1997, Tully co-founded Fieldpoint Private Bank and Trust in 2008.
