= Mary Burfitt Williams =

Australian physician and pathologist (1882–1956)

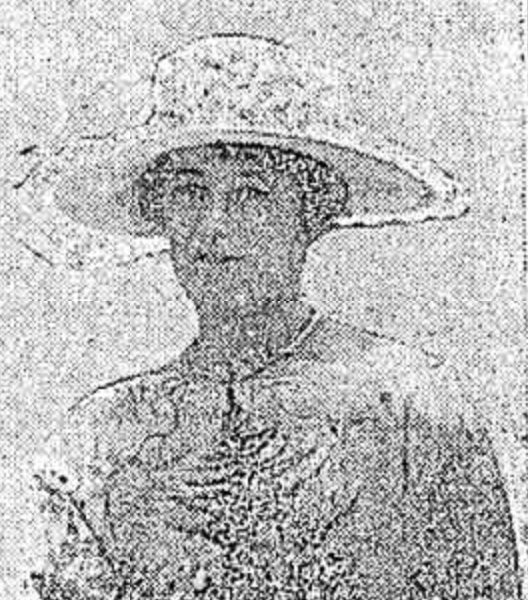
- Williams on her wedding day, 1921
- Born: Mary Boyd Burfitt; 9 November 1882; Redfern, New South Wales, Australia
- Died: 30 November 1956 (aged 74); Bellevue Hill, New South Wales, Australia
- Burial place: Waverley Cemetery
- Education: University of Sydney

Mary Boyd Burfitt Williams (9 November 1882 – 30 November 1956) was an Australian pathologist and physician. She was the first pathologist at Lewisham Hospital in Sydney and later a physician in Macquarie Street.

== Early life and education ==
Mary Boyd Burfitt was born on 9 November 1882, daughter of Annie (née Fitzmaurice) and auctioneer and historian Charles Trimby Burfitt. She was one of seven children, of whom two brothers became doctors and the third a solicitor. She was educated at Rosebank College in Five Dock, matriculating in 1902. She completed a BA and BSc at the University of Sydney, before graduating with first class honours in Bachelor of Medicine in 1909 and a Master of Surgery from the same university in 1910. As part of her degree she studied pathology and, with fellow student Elsie Dalyell, wrote a paper which was presented at a medical conference in Victoria.

== Career ==
Williams and Dalyell found employment at the Royal Prince Alfred Hospital (RPAH) in 1910. She was working as a pathologist at RPAH in 1912, being the first female senior resident there, and at Lewisham Hospital in 1914. Despite some resistance, she was appointed residency status at Crown Street Women's Hospital where she gained experience in obstetrics. She opened a general practice in Glebe in 1912 until 1924 when she moved into rooms in Macquarie Street. She maintained the role of honorary physician at Lewisham Hospital until 1938.

Williams was elected president of the University Catholic Women's Society in 1924, a year after it was inaugurated. She was an active member of the movement which led to the establishment of Sancta Sophia College, a residential college for Roman Catholic women at the University of Sydney in 1929. She sat on the Council of the college from its inception through to 1953.

== Personal ==
Williams married fellow doctor Grosvenor Williams on 19 January 1921 at St James' Church in Glebe. Their three sons also became medical doctors and two were lecturers at the University of Sydney.

She died on 30 November 1956 at Bellevue Hill and is buried at Waverley Cemetery.
