= Jacobs' Inn =

Jacob's Inn was a notable 18th-century inn located in Thompson, Connecticut.

The inn was founded by Nathaniel Jacobs, who was born in Hingham, Massachusetts in 1683. He bought two large properties in Thompson in for $5400 in 1742, and stayed there for the rest of his life. He was an important member of the Congregational Church He died in 1772 at age 90, and the inn was taken over by his son John Jacobs after his death. John Jacobs was known as 'Landlord Jacobs.' The Inn was called a Halfway House because it was approximately halfway between Hartford and Boston.

The inn was notable because both George Washington and the Marquis de Lafayette spent time there. Washington once wrote in his journal that he apparently did not enjoy a breakfast that he had at the inn. Once, Washington's coach left the inn without him, but he was able to overtake it on foot. Also notably, Lafayette left his masonic apron at the Inn, and it was passed down through the Jacobs family.
