= Roland Thill =

Luxembourgish footballer

Personal information
- Full name: Roland Thill
- Date of birth: 25 November 1954
- Place of birth: Luxembourg
- Date of death: 25 March 2017 (aged 62)
- Place of death: Luxembourg
- Position: Midfielder

Senior career*
Years	Team	Apps	(Gls)
1974–1983	Progrès Niederkorn		

International career
1974–1975	Luxembourg	3	(0)
- * Club domestic league appearances and goals

Roland Thill (25 November 1954 – 25 March 2017) was a Luxembourgish footballer who played as a midfielder and made three appearances for the Luxembourg national team.

== Career ==
Thill made his international debut for Luxembourg on 8 December 1974 in a friendly match against Belgium B, which finished as a 1–8 loss in Luxembourg City. He earned three appearances in total for Luxembourg, earning his final cap on 22 April 1975 in a friendly against the Netherlands Olympic team, which finished as a 1–2 loss.

== Personal life ==
Thill died on 25 March 2017 at the age of 62.

== Career statistics ==
=== International ===
Luxembourg
Year	Apps	Goals
1974	1	0
1975	2	0
Total	3	0
