= Tully (surname) =

Family name of Irish origin

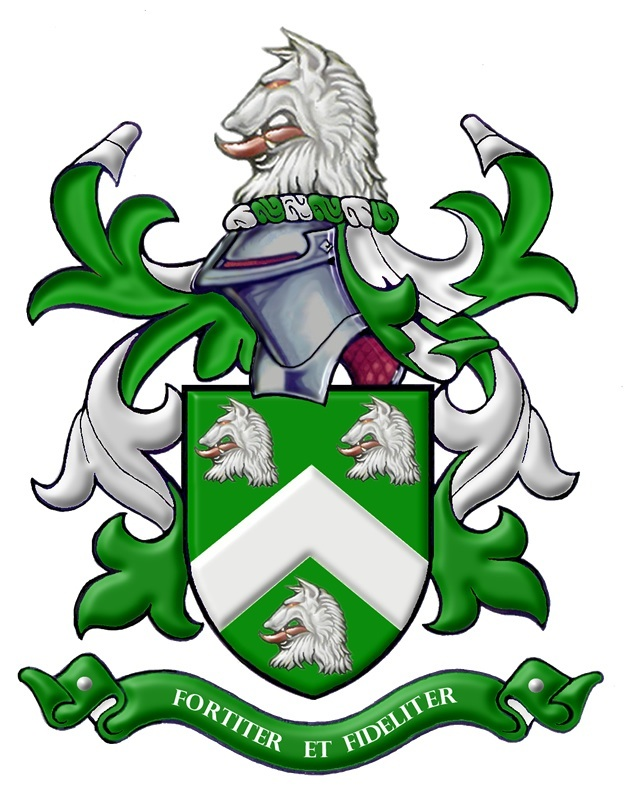
- Tully of Galway Coat of Arms
- Pronunciation: tul-lee
- Language: Irish

Origin
- Meaning: devoted to the will (i.e. of God) or quiet, peaceful
- Region of origin: Ireland

Other names
- Related names: Tally, Tilly, MacTully, MacTilly, MacAtilla, O'Multilly, O'Multully, MacCantully, and Flood

Tully is a surname of Irish origin, with spelling variations that include Tally, Talley, Tilly, MacTully, MacTilly, MacAtilla, O'Multilly, O'Multully, MacCantully, and Flood. These names are anglicisations of the following Irish names: Ó Taithligh, Ó Maoltuile, Mac Maoltuile, Mac Taichligh, and Mac an Tuile. Mac an Tuile is a corruption of Mac Maoltuile, and has also been anglicised as Flood due to "tuile" in Irish meaning "flood".

== Ulster ==
According to John O'Hart, the Tully's, in the form of the Muintir Taithligh (extended-family of Tully), were chiefs of the Hy-Laoghaire of Lough Lir. This district was near the barony of Lurg, close to Lough Erne, County Fermanagh, Northern Ireland. MacLysaght states that "Tally" and "Tully" are anglicisations of a sept called O'Taithligh located near Omagh, County Tyrone, and that they were erenaghs of Devenish, which lies in western County Fermangh. Woulfe connects these two as being the same also citing that their name originates from Ó Taighligh (also spelt as Ó Taichligh) meaning "descendant of Taithleach", with Taithleach meaning "quiet, peaceful".

The Annals of Tigernach make mention of a Fland mac Máele Tuile who was the son of Maeltuile Ua Crunnmaeil. Fland is cited as chief of the Cenél nEógain and belonged to the Cenél Feradaig. Maeltuile was the son of Crundmáel mac Suibni, who had also been chief of the Cenél nEógain.

The Clan Tully Association's pursuivant, Andrew Tully, claims that the Clan O'Maoltuile can be traced back as chiefs of Lough Lir through Maolfreach, who was also chief of the Cenél nEógain and belonged to the Cenél maic Ercae. Though Maolfreach is recorded as having died in 630 AD, whereas O'Hart states the Muintir Taithligh were chiefs in the 12th century.

Ironically, Maolfreach's son, Máel Dúin mac Máele Fithrich, was slain by Fland mac Máele Tuile in 681 at the Battle of Bla Sléibe (in modern County Londonderry).

== Connacht and Breifne ==
Tully is also an anglicisation of O Maoltuile and Mac Maoltuile, the name of a medical family that lived in present-day County Roscommon, which lies in the ancient province of Connacht. Mac Maoltuile is also shortened as Mac Tuile. Here it is also anglicised amongst other names as O'Multilly, O'Multully, MacAtilla, M'Cultully, M'Cuntully, and M'Ethwille. It has also been anglicised as Flood due to a corruption of the original name to Mac an Tuile, with "tuile" meaning flood.

The MacTully's are described as being the hereditary physicians of the O'Connor's of Connacht and the O'Reilly's of Kingdom of Breifne. One of these Mac Tuile's is stated by an eye-witness as being present at the inauguration of Cathal O'Conor, the last king of Connacht, of which he was his physician.

O'Dugan and Keating also make mention of the MacTaichligh or MacTilly's, who they state as being chiefs in the 12th century of a district in the parish of Drung, in the barony of Tullygarvey, County Cavan, which was a part of Breifne. Here they were subordinate to the O'Rourkes and O'Reillys.

== Clan Tully Association ==
Badge of the Chumann Chlainne Uí Mhaoiltuile

The Clan Tully Association, or Chumann Clann ua Maoltuile, was set up in 2009 to help rally support from Tully's worldwide with the intent of reviving the Tully clanship. This was followed by a clan constitution that was submitted to a meeting of Tully representatives from across the world. Upon its ratification, it was stated that it was the first Clan Tully meeting since "fourteen centuries ago. It was convened on a monastic island in Loch Erne Ireland."

The association's objectives include promoting the interests and welfare of Tullys worldwide, bringing them closer together, as well as the perpetuation of Gaelic culture. Along with other objectives, it seeks to research and document the history of the Tullys and raise awareness of the clan.

The current chairperson of the Clan Tully Association's clan council as of 2009 is Tyler M. Tully of the United States.

The Clan Tully Association claims that all Tullys descend from Maoltuile, the younger brother of Maoldoon, sons of Maolfreach. This claim is partially backed up by the Irish Liber Hymnorum which states "And from Mael-tuile son of Mael-fith . . are the race of Mac Mael-tuile". John O'Hart also notes a Maoltuile as the son of Maolfreach.

== See also ==
- Tully (disambiguation)
- Tully (given name)
