= Tully (given name) =

Tully is a unisex, given name derived from the surname.

Notable people with the name include:

- Tully Banta-Cain (born 1980), American football player
- Tully Bevilaqua (born 1972), Australian basketball player
- Tully Blanchard (born 1954), American professional wrestler and manager
- Tully Craig (1895–1963), Scottish footballer and manager
- Tully Filmus (1903–1998), American painter
- Tully Friedman (born 1942), American businessman
- Tully Jensen (born 1963), American model and actress
- Tully Kearney (born 1997), British Paralympic swimmer
- Tully Kingdon (1835–1907), British Anglican bishop
- Tully Marshall (1864–1943), American actor
- Tully McCrea (1839–1918), United States Army general
- Tully Satre (born 1989), American blogger
- Tully Scott (1857–1924), American judge
- Tully Sparks (1874–1937), American baseball player

Nickname

- Marcus Tullius Cicero (106–43 BC), Roman statesman and lawyer, is sometimes nicknamed Tully

== See also ==
- Tully (disambiguation)
- Tully (surname)
