= Tully Mountain =

Mountain in Massachusetts

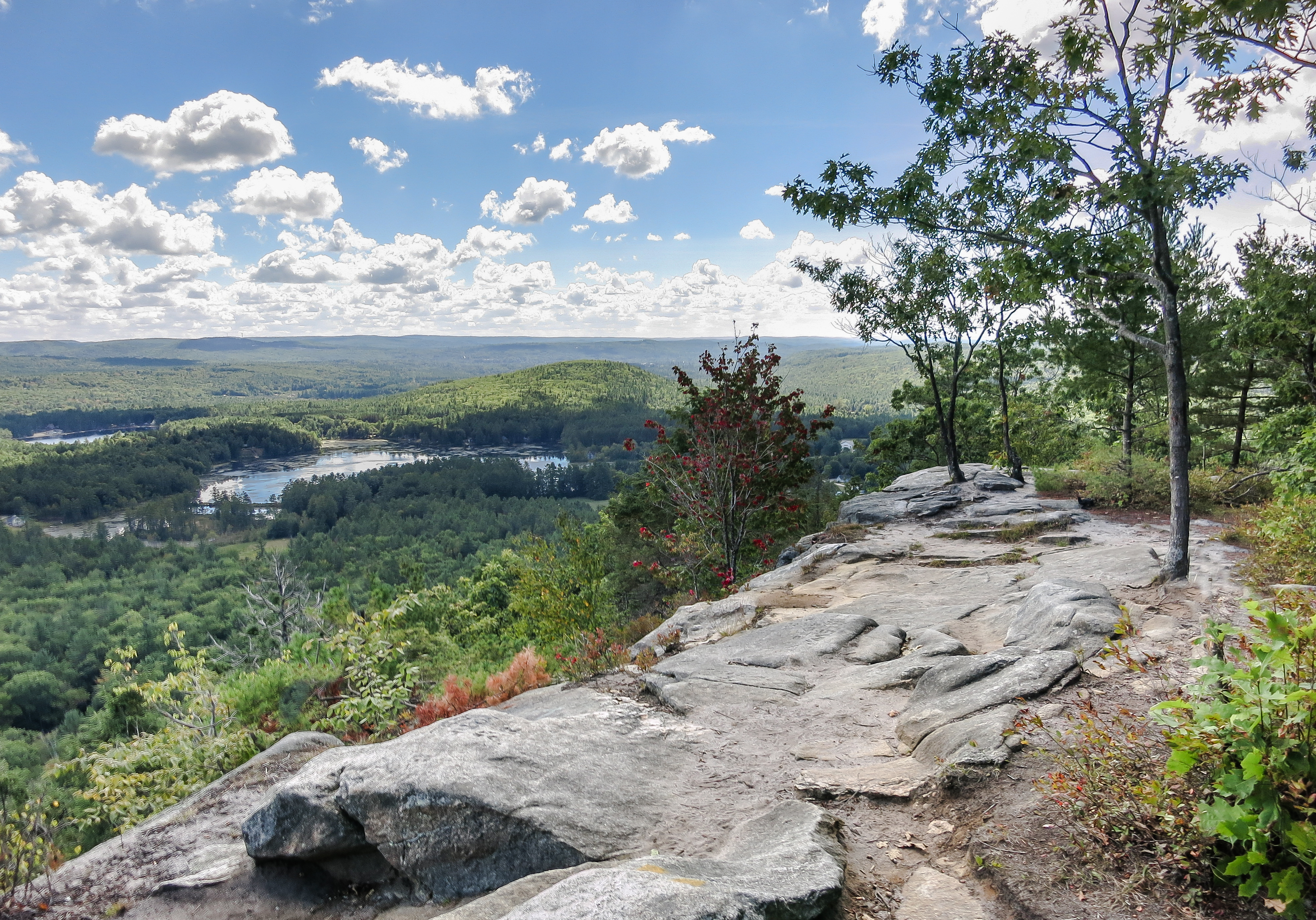
- Southeast View from Tully Mountain

Highest point
- Elevation: 1,163 ft (354 m)
- Prominence: 499 ft (152 m)
- Coordinates: 42°38′52″N 72°14′58″W

Geography
- Location: Orange, Massachusetts
- Parent range: Central Massachusetts highlands

Geology
- Rock age: 200 million years
- Mountain type(s): Metamorphic rock; monadnock

Climbing
- Easiest route: Tully Trail

Tully Mountain, 1,163 ft (354 m), is a prominent, steep-sided monadnock located in north central Massachusetts in the town of Orange. It is part of the Tully Mountain Wilderness Management Area. An exposed east facing ledge on the summit provides views of the Millers River valley, Mount Monadnock, Mount Wachusett, and the Wapack Range. The 22-mile (35 km) Tully Trail traverses the mountain.

There exists a Tully Mountain (Ireland) that, at 1168 feet above sea level, is almost identical in elevation to the Tully Mountain in Massachusetts.

The mountain drains into the Tully River, then into the Millers River, then to the Connecticut River and Long Island Sound.

The mountaintop is forested, except for a rocky outcropping (a monadnock) that faces due east, and a second granite "ledges" facing due west; the rocky prominence of Tully Mountain is visible from surrounding small towns and is a defining characteristic of this small mountain. The form of the mountain is known as "ramp and pluck", as taught by science teacher Robert Coyle, Athol Junior High School. The rocky eastern popular vantage point is the "practical" summit of the mountain, as the geological summit is wooded, unmarked, and without views. The vista, looking afar from the steep ledge, features Mount Monadnock (Jaffrey, NH, the peak of which is 16 miles NE); the bump of Gap Mountain, which can be seen just in front of Mount Monadnock; to the left of Mount Monadnock and distant is Mount Sunapee; Mount Kearsarge (Merrimack County, New Hampshire) is visible (55 miles away); Mount Cardigan is the shadowed mountain distant to the left/north of Mount Kearsarge; the tallest mountain in the distant southeast is Mount Wachusett, which is 22 miles away; also visible is the church steeple of Royalston, MA at 3.7 miles away, and three bodies of water: Tully Lake (due east, with views of automobile traffic across the dam), Packard Pond (including its private beach), and the lily-padded Tully Pond (south east). Mount Washington and the Presidential Range is not visible from Tully Mountain due to distance and being obscured by elevations in between.

With spyglass magnification of 15x-20x or more (high powered binoculars, spotting scope), the distant Quabbin Reservoir Observation Tower (24 miles south) is visible on the horizon line when peering far right/southward (over the ascent from the cemetery). Visible in the near south-eastern view is the town of Athol, Massachusetts, with its uptown (spires include the Congregational church (4.4 miles away) and the Athol Historical Society); the uptown Main Street coming directly toward the viewer (automobile headlights), the stoplight at foot of Pleasant Street; further south is downtown (Starretts and Union Twist Drill smokestacks), the former Athol High/Junior High (now senior citizen housing) and various steeples of downtown churches, such as the Athol-Orange Baptist Church with the large brick casket factory behind. Peering northward from Tully Mountain, one can see people atop Mount Monadnock silhouetted at the skyline. Mount Kearsarge's antenna tower and smaller tower can be viewed on a clear day (55 miles away) north-east.

The mountain actually has twin "peaks" topographically, having a smaller 856-ft elevation to its south, near Fryeville Road, Mayo Road, and Tully Pond, which is sometimes referred to as Little Tully Mountain. Little Tully Mountain is clearly visible from Tully Mountain, but is seldom climbed as it is forested.

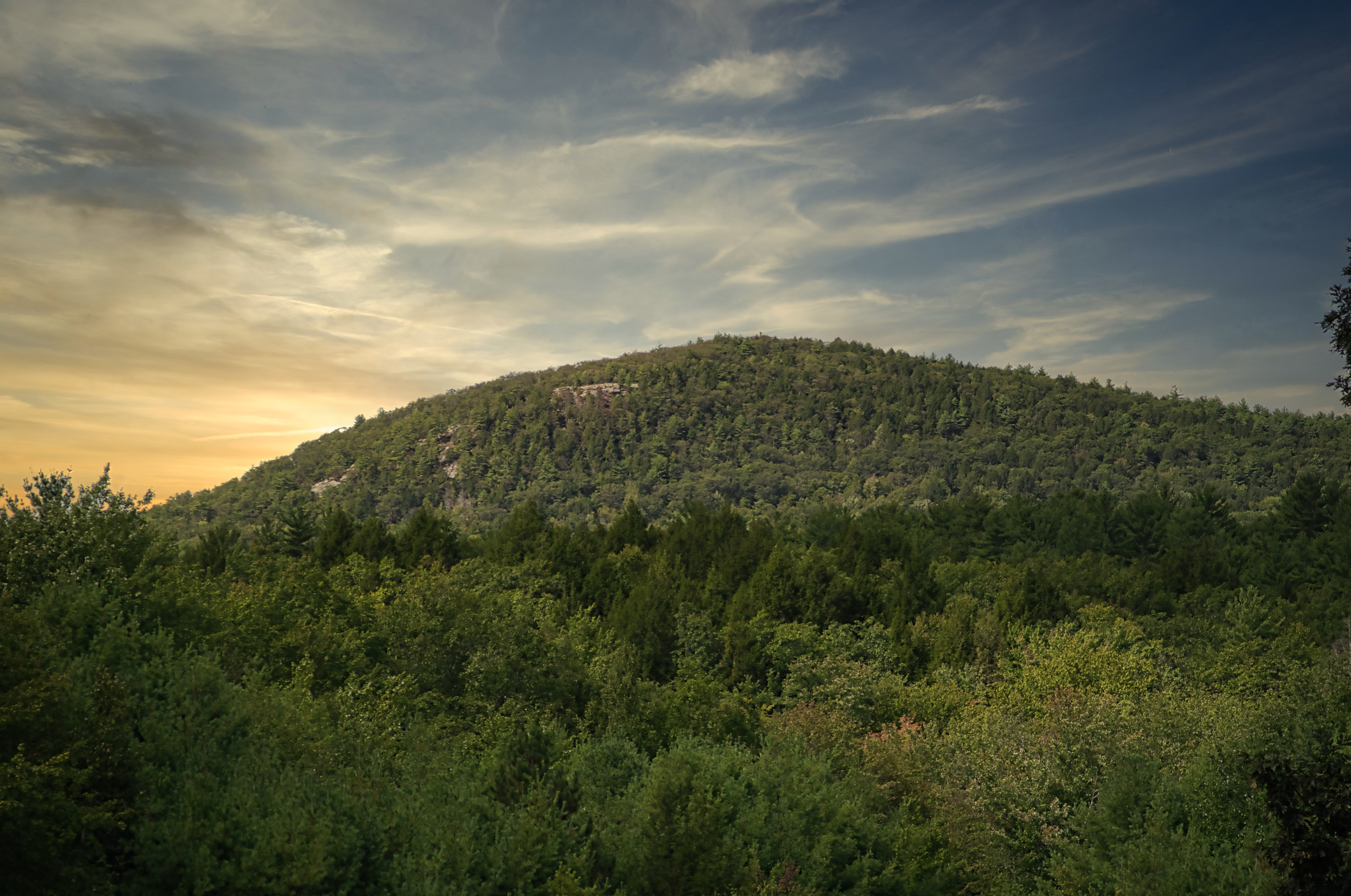
Tully Mtn. from Tully Lake

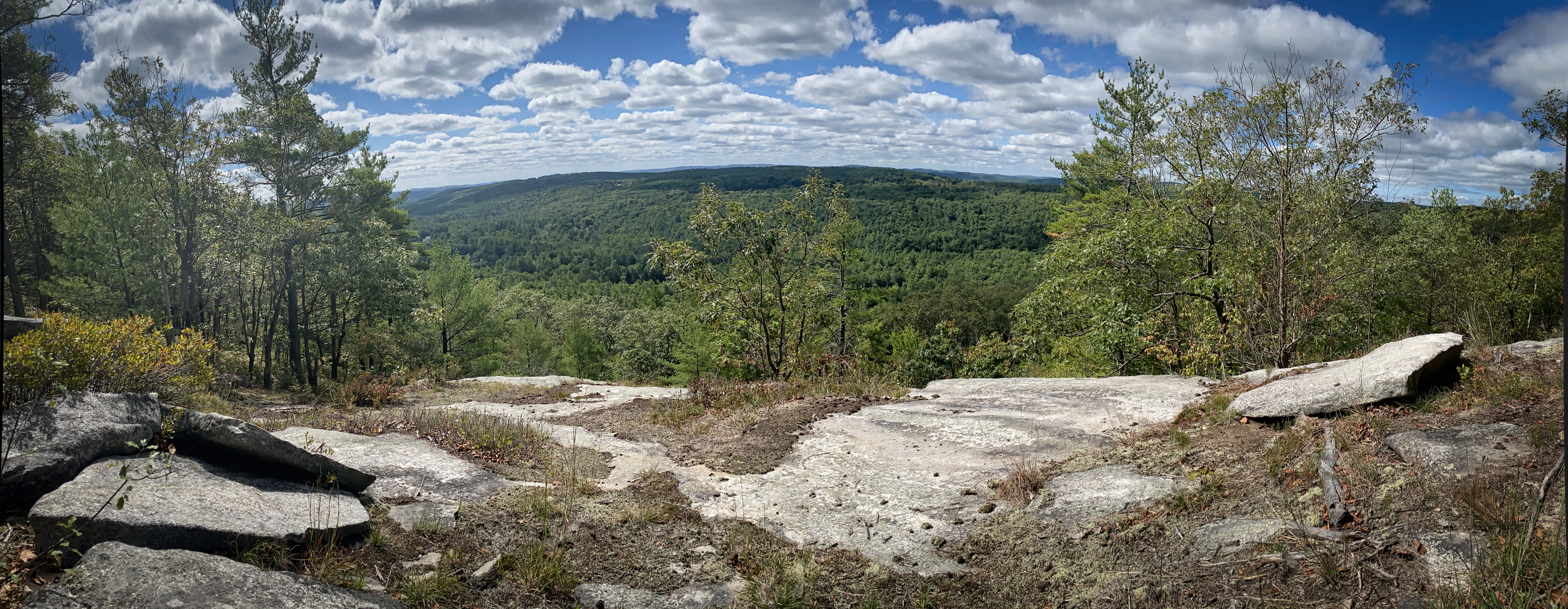
Westerly View via Thatcher Ledges

On the west side and near the top of Tully Mountain is an open granite area, larger than the more common eastward observation point, called Tully Ledges or "Thatcher Ledges" after a local that discovered the obscure vantage point in 1968. Clearly viewed on any satellite map, it is accessed from the cemetery trail only a hundred yards or so from the top of the trail and to the left/west. It is not a well-marked pathway and is seldom hiked. The Thatcher Ledges provides views to the west, including homes in North Orange, and some mountains and antenna in western Massachusetts. However, the views are not long and open due to the hills immediately in front of the observer, principally Temple Hill (over 1000 feet); Mount Greylock cannot be observed. The rocky ledges are a fine place for solitude, nature observation, picnicking, and birdwatching. The granite is sloped and often damp, easily turning a twisted ankle or errantly placed boot into a significant tumble down the rocky face. Extreme caution is mandatory, and hiking Thatcher Ledges after rain or ice is not suggested.

At least one documented injury with rescue occurred on Tully Mountain in May, 2018, when a 25-year-old hiker lost his footing on a wet trail and could not get himself out of the woods after he had rolled down a hill 15–20 feet and then fell off a ledge another 10–12 feet, landing on his back. He was able to call 911 for help. Orange Fire & Rescue and the Western Mass Regional Technical Rescue Team responded, a medical helicopter was denied due to weather, so the rescue team set up a rope system to get the man out of the woods before he was sent to UMass-Worcester to be treated for his injuries.

In August, 2020, authorities were alerted to a fire just below the eastward observation point of the mountain. Fire crews from local fire departments, Massachusetts Forest Fire Control, and the Massachusetts Department of Fisheries and Wildlife responded and controlled the fire, the cause of which remains under investigation. Due to the steep, treacherous terrain, the Massachusetts Air National Guard responded and made several water drops with a Blackhawk helicopter, drawing water from Tully Pond.

Access to hike up the mountaintop of Tully Mountain is typically by one of three routes: (a) Cemetery Route from a pathway starting near the over-wintering vault at the Tully Cemetery, just south of Tully mountain, or (b) Tully Brook Route from a small unmarked dirt parking area off Tully Road, adjacent to the bridge over the Tully River, just west of the mountain; this pathway follows a completely level and wide cart-path and logging operation around the base of the mountain for about 3/8ths of a mile, and then ascends along a yellow blazed trail, or (c) Mountain Road Route from a defined parking area at the terminus of Mountain Road near the eastern base of the mountain on the side of the open observation face, allowing a slow pathway ascent and views of your parked vehicle from the observation point; one can walk the wide path in a slow winding ascent (this is the easiest, gentlest route up the mountain), or can cut directly across the field from the parking lot to a defined path that quickly connects with the cemetery ascent route (the steepest, fastest route up the mountain). From this parking lot, voices are heard as they carry down the mountain from the observation monadnock. The slow ascent trail is 0.9 miles long and winds along a classic New England stone wall which runs along a pasture and a bog before turning direction through the forested approach to the summit. The parking lot is at 709 feet altitude, and the total altitude gain of the hike is 422 feet to the east observation area.

Although there are blue and yellow blazes, there are no defined trailhead signs, and there is no fee to use the area. The sign at the parking area indicates No Camping. Total hiking time one-way to the vista is approximately 20–30 minutes, making this a common destination for hikers of all ages, active families, among others.
