= Mary Floyd Cushman =

American medical doctor and missionary

- Born: July 24, 1870; Royalston, Massachusetts
- Died: 1965 (aged 94–95); Laconia, New Hampshire
- Education: Boston University School of Medicine
- Occupations: physician, Christian missionary
- Years active: 1893–1953
- Organization: American Board of Commissioners for Foreign Missions

Mary Floyd Cushman (July 24, 1870 – 1965) was an American physician and Christian missionary. She served as the Maine State Medical Board’s first female member and later as a medical missionary in Angola for 20 years.

== Early life, education, and family ==
Cushman was born to John Paine Cushman and Caroline M. Cushman in Royalston, Massachusetts. Her father was the minister of the Trinitarian Parish in Castine, Maine, beginning in 1885 when Cushman was 15. Cushman went to college at Eastern State Maine Normal School in Castine, Maine, now Maine Maritime Academy. She graduated with honors in 1888 and continued her education, studying medicine at the Boston University School of Medicine. In 1892, she earned her Medical Degree. Cushman cared for her elderly mother for 20 years prior to becoming a missionary.

== Career ==
=== Practice in Maine, US (1893–1922) ===
Cushman worked as a doctor in both hospital and private practice from 1893 to 1922 in Massachusetts and Maine. During this time, Cushman was appointed as the first woman member of the Maine State Medical Board.

=== Missionary service (1922–1953) ===
In 1922, Cushman moved to Angola, West Africa, to serve as a medical missionary by the American Board of Commissioners for Foreign Missions. She was 52 years old. During her time in West Africa, Cushman established a hospital in Chilesso, Angola. She served most of the general population of Angola, taking far trips for extreme cases, and having many sick people travel to her for treatment. One of her notable acts as a missionary was working on staffing the hospital solely with the indigenous people of the area that she had trained. She was recognized as a transitional missionary who focused on "equitable" views of traditional Angolan culture rather than the negative views of early missionaries. She also encouraged the people there to provide more advanced education for their children, so that they could run the hospital themselves.

Cushman also worked to promote the advancement of Christianity in her area of Angola. She worked alongside the church already there, encouraging the members and witnessing to her patients and others she came across.

In 1944, Cushman published a book she had written about her experiences called Missionary Doctor: The Story of Twenty Years in Africa. The book discusses the Angolan people and their customs and includes descriptions of medical practices Cushman learned from the people there. Cushman was a firm believer in using effective medical practices from other cultures and picked up several ideas from the people there to use in her own practice.

== Later life and legacy ==
In 1953, at the age of 83, Cushman returned to the United States. She died in Laconia, New Hampshire in 1965 at the age of 95.

In 2003, the Maine Medical Society established the Mary Floyd Cushman Award in her honor. Nominations are based on performing medical volunteer work as a doctor in the United States or internationally.

The Trinitarian Congregational Parish in Castine, Maine, maintains the Dr. Mary Cushman Circle to raise funds to continue to support missionary service locally and internationally.

== Selected works ==
- Missionary Doctor: The Story of Twenty Years in Africa, 1944
