= Tull (surname) =

Tull is a surname. Notable people with the surname include:

- Davis Tull (born 1991), American football player)
- Edmund Tull (1870–1911), Hungarian artist
- Fisher Tull (1934–1994), American musician
- Jethro Tull (agriculturist) (1674–1740), English agricultural pioneer
- Mustafa Wahbi et Tull (1897–1949), Jordanian poet
- Patrick Tull (1941–2006), British actor
- Renetta Garrison Tull, American electrical engineer
- Thomas Tull (born 1970), American businessman and film producer
- Walter Tull (1888–1918), British football player and soldier

Fictional characters:

- Vernon Tull and Cora Tull, a fictional couple in the William Faulkner novel As I Lay Dying
