= Survivance =

Critical term in Native American studies

Survivance is a critical term in Native American studies.

== History ==
Survivance was originally a legal term, but fell out of use in the 18th century. It was also borrowed from the French term survivance in other contexts.

== Usage ==
The term survivance was first employed in the context of Native American studies by the Anishinaabe cultural theorist Gerald Vizenor, in his 1992 article “Manifest Manners: The Long Gaze of Christopher Columbus” in the journal boundary 2 and became more widely known from his 1993 book Manifest Manners: Narratives on Postindian Survivance. There he explains that "Survivance is an active sense of presence, the continuance of native stories, not a mere reaction, or a survivable name. Native survivance stories are renunciations of dominance, tragedy and victimry". Vizenor makes the term, which is deliberately imprecise, the cornerstone of his analysis of contemporary Native American literature, culture and politics. Several critics (e.g. Alan Velie) have analysed the term as a portmanteau of "survival and endurance," and others (e.g. Jace Weaver) have read it as a portmanteau of "survival + resistance," but there does not seem to be any evidence that Vizenor had such a specific combination in mind. Rather, by changing the suffix from -al to -ance, he insists on an active survival, in which contemporary Native American peoples go beyond merely subsisting in the ruins of tribal cultures to actively inheriting and refashioning those cultures for the postmodern age. The Cherokee-descent poet Diane Glancy demonstrates the ways that an imprecise term can inspire creativity by reconfiguring it: "Poetry is rebound. A turn of writing. (Sur)vivance: Sur – a survival outside survival. Vivance – the vitality of it."

Vizenor frequently defines "survivance" in opposition to "victimry", some commentators note. Karl Kroeber writes that Vizenor's "work aims to repair a peculiarly vicious consequence of genocidal attacks on native of the Americas: an inducing in them of their destroyers' view that they are mere survivors. By accepting this imposed definition of themselves as victims, natives complete psychologically the not-quite-entirely-successful physical genocide." Similarly, Joe Lockard calls it "the condition of self-reliant or communal survival without the social or personal indulgence of victimization."

The word has become a term of art in contemporary Native American studies, used far beyond the context of Vizenor's own work. It is now also an interactive video game, and is used in captions for the National Museum of the American Indian, as well as being employed numerous times in titles of books and academic articles.

== Similar terms ==
The word was subsequently utilized in the 20th century by francophone Canadians as "La Survivance", from the French "survivance" (relict) and also employed by the French theorist Jacques Derrida to denote a spectral existence that would be neither life nor death, and migrated into English thence from French.
