= Royalston, Massachusetts =

- Town
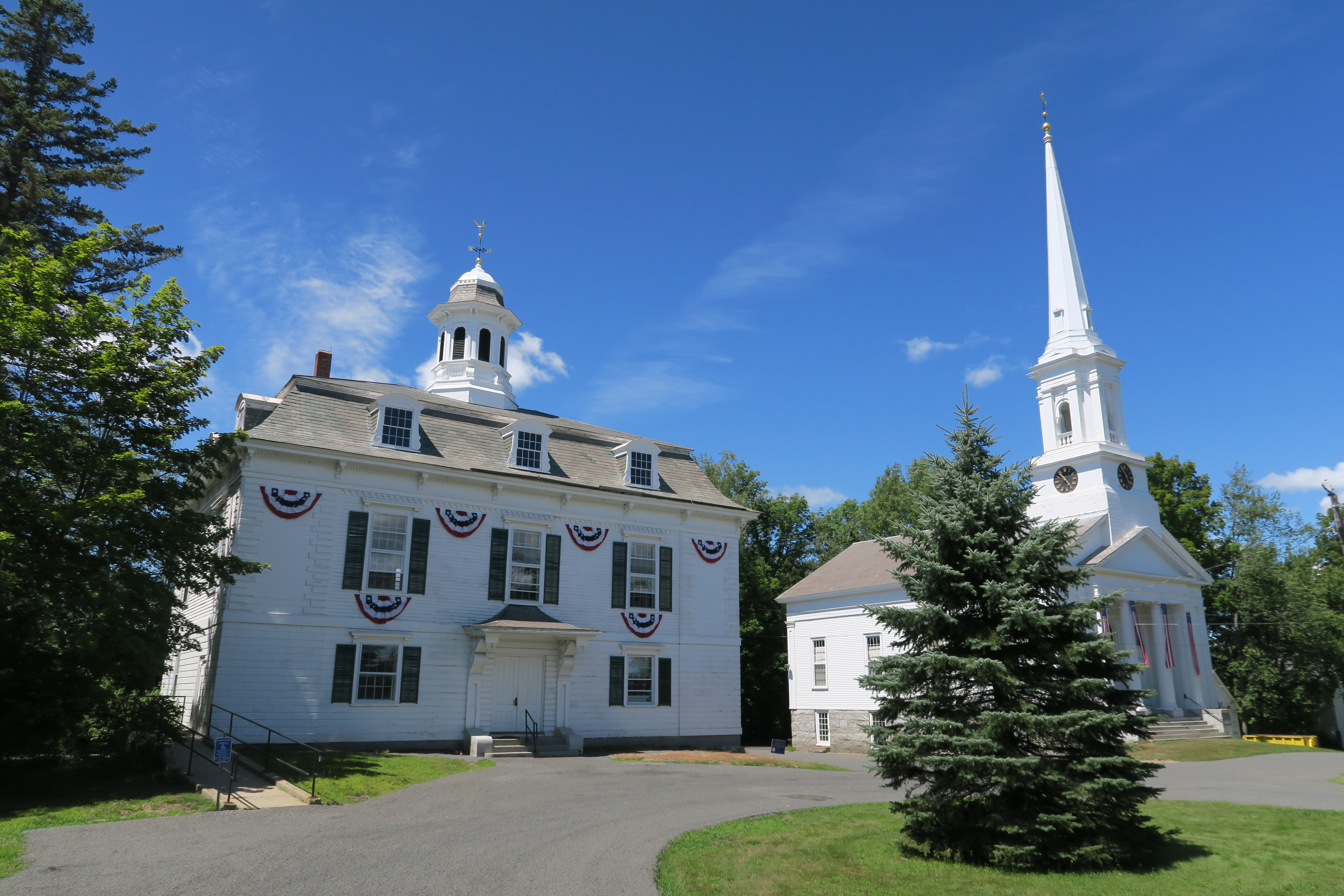
- Town Hall and First Congregational Church

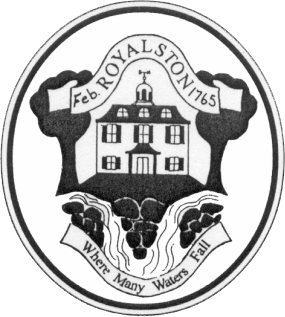
- Seal
- Nickname: "Where Many Waters Fall"
- Location in Worcester County and the state of Massachusetts.
- Coordinates: 42°40′39″N 72°11′18″W
- Country: United States
- State: Massachusetts
- County: Worcester
- Settled: 1762
- Incorporated: 1765

Government
  - Type: Open town meeting

Area
  - Total: 42.5 sq mi (110.0 km^{2})
  - Land: 41.9 sq mi (108.5 km^{2})
  - Water: 0.58 sq mi (1.5 km^{2})
- Elevation: 1,014 ft (309 m)

Population (2020)
  - Total: 1,250
  - Density: 29.8/sq mi (11.5/km^{2})
- Time zone: UTC-5 (Eastern)
  - Summer (DST): UTC-4 (Eastern)
- ZIP code: 01368
- Area code: 351 / 978
- FIPS code: 25-58580
- GNIS feature ID: 0619488
- Website: http://www.royalston-ma.gov/

Royalston is a town in Worcester County, Massachusetts, United States. The population was 1,250 at the 2020 census.

== History ==
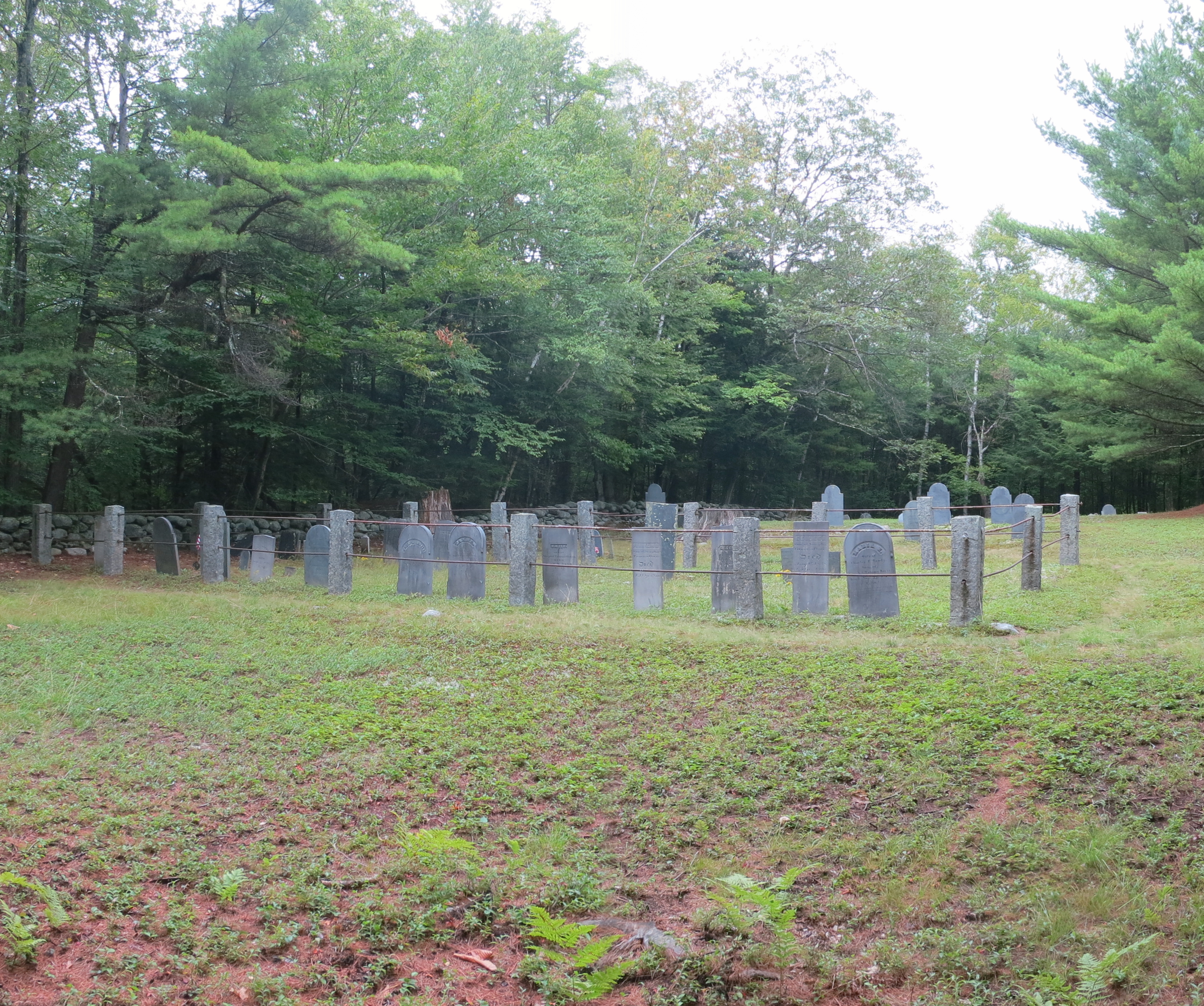
Newton Cemetery, one of several Royalston cemeteries – this one is located near the trailhead to Royalston Falls.

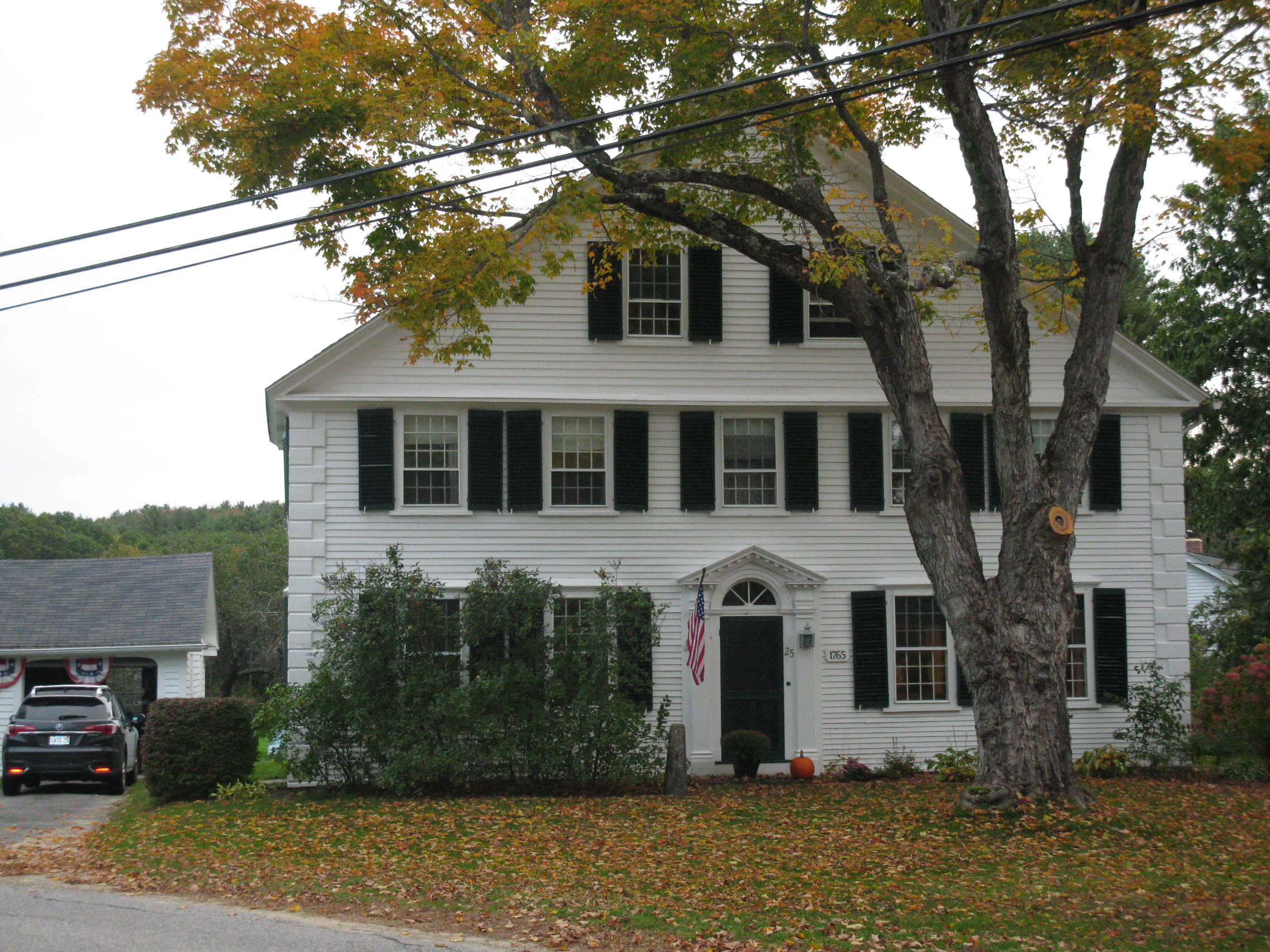
Royalston Historic District

Royalston is a small town in the North Quabbin area of northwestern-central Massachusetts. It was named after Isaac Royall, a slaveholder and businessperson from Medford, Massachusetts who founded the town in a land deal in 1765. Most of the town's land is forest and wetlands, and there are several reservations and wildlife management areas. Two reservations are the Tully Lake flood protection dam area in the very southwestern part of the town, and the Royalston Falls reservation in the northern section.

The largest population center in the town is the village of South Royalston in the southeastern corner of the town. The historic center of Royalston is home to a small village that contains a very well preserved classic colonial New England town center and common. The center of town contains the town hall, post office, congregational church, and the town's library.

== Geography and transportation ==
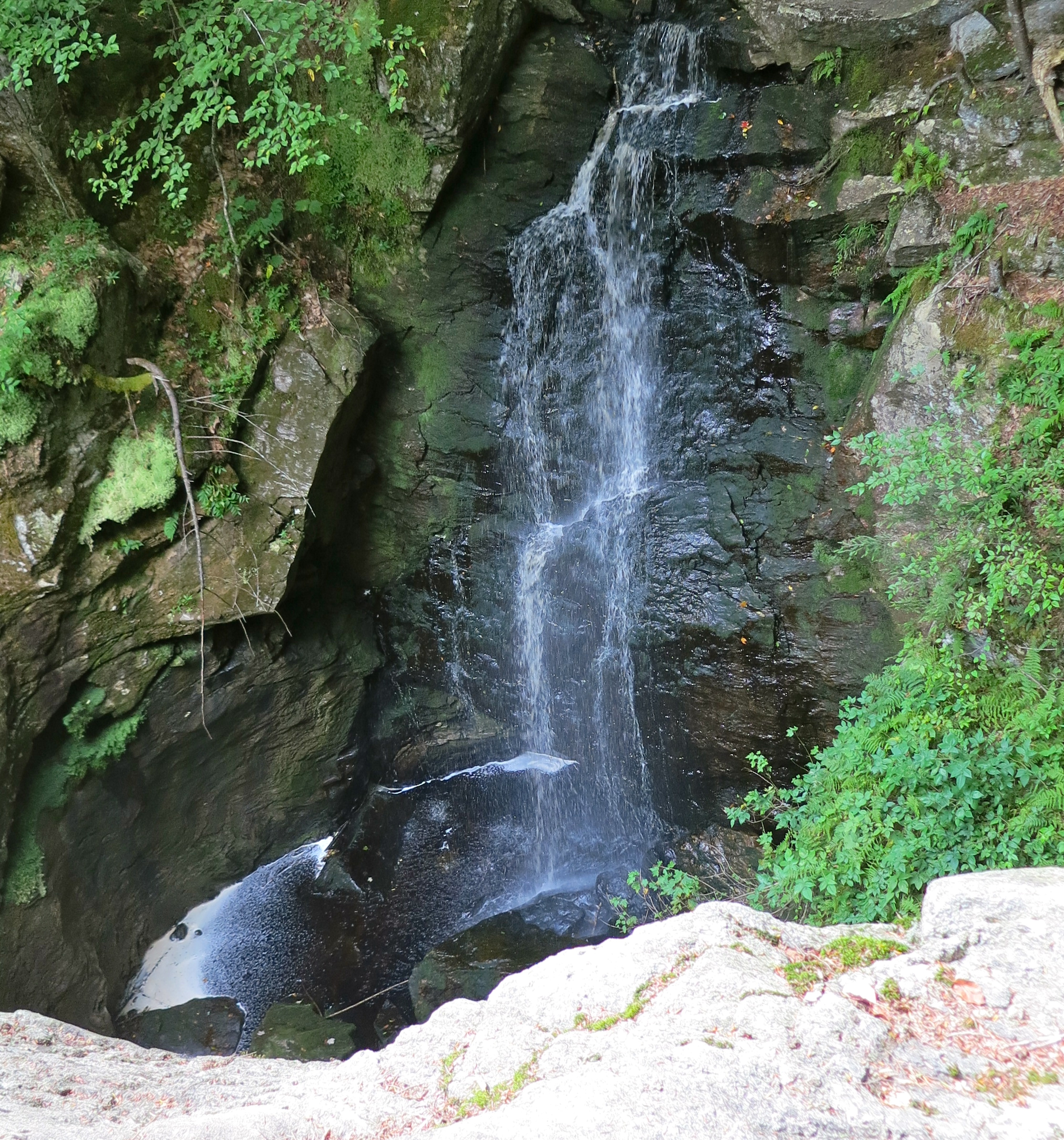
Royalston Falls are reached on a 0.8 mile descending pathway from the trailhead on Route 32.

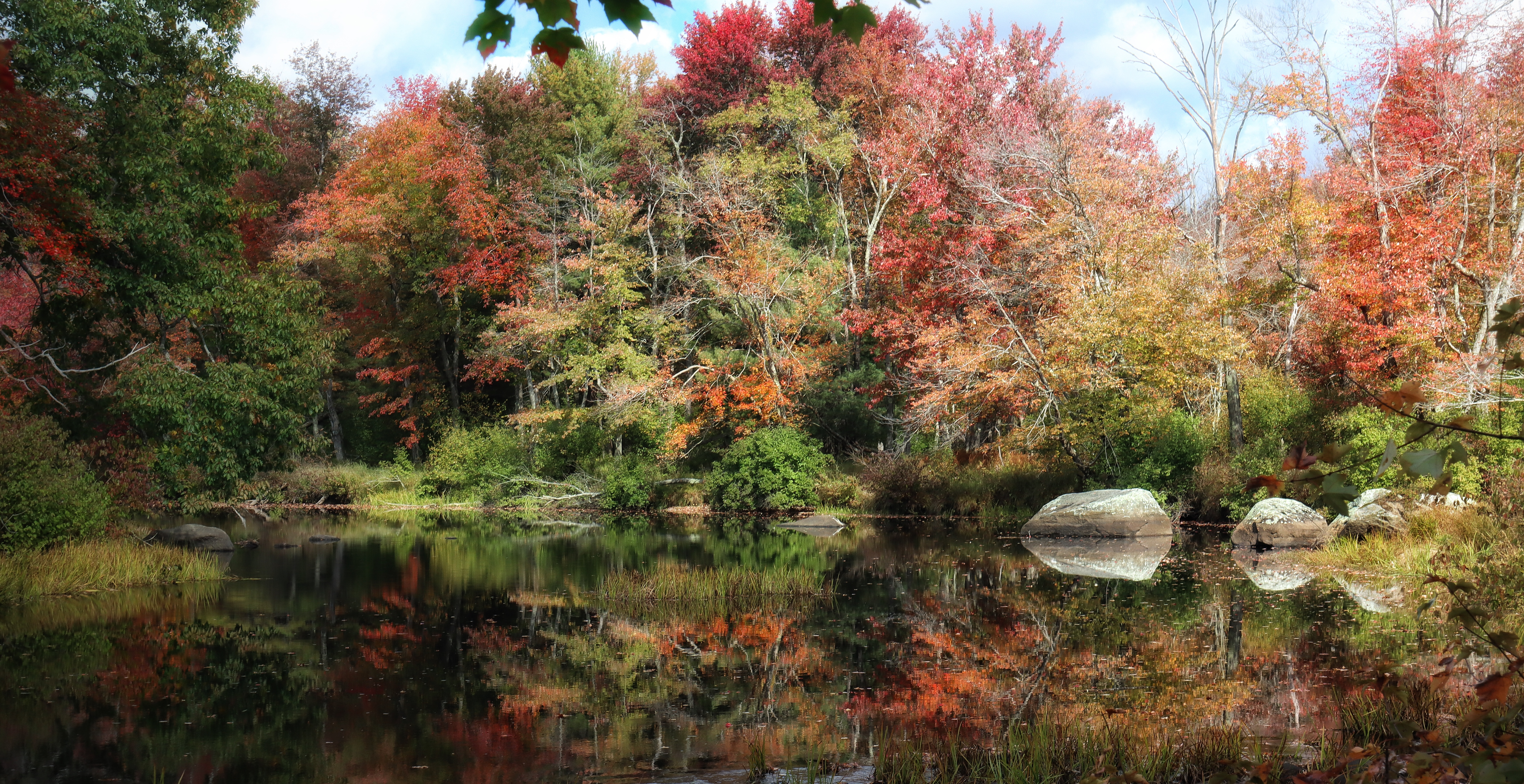
Millers River from Main Street – South Royalston Thatcher

According to the United States Census Bureau, the town has a total area of 42.5 square miles (110 km^{2}), of which 41.9 square miles (109 km^{2}) is land and 0.6 square miles (1.6 km^{2}), or 1.39%, is water. Royalston is located in the northwestern part of central Massachusetts, on hilly land. The town center lies near Frye Hill, which quickly slopes downward just west of the town center, into the Tully River valley. The Tully River empties through Long Pond and Tully Lake before flowing into the Millers River in neighboring Athol, downstream from where that river flows through the southeast corner of town. Several other brooks cross through the town, with some of the land along these brooks being marshlands. To the northwest, White Hill (1,361') rises near the Warwick town line, and is the highest point in the town. Notable is the Royalston Falls located off of Route 32 near the New Hampshire border. Royalston is home to several wildlife management areas, including Birch Hill, Millers River, Lawrence Brook and Fish Brook, the first two of which cover three substantial portions of the eastern half of town. The town also has two portions of state forest near West Royalston.

Royalston is the northwestern corner of Worcester County, bordered by Franklin County to the west and Cheshire County, New Hampshire, to the north. It is bordered by Athol to the south, Phillipston and Templeton to the southeast, Winchendon to the east, Richmond and Fitzwilliam, New Hampshire to the north, and Warwick and Orange in Franklin County to the west. The town center lies 24 miles (39 km) west-northwest of Fitchburg, 38 miles (61 km) northwest of Worcester and 68 miles (109 km) northwest of Boston. The town is mostly divided into three villages, the central village, West Royalston and South Royalston.

Royalston does not have any interstates or other highways passing through town, the nearest being Route 2 to the south, most easily reached through Phillipston and Templeton. Route 32 passes through the western part of town, heading north before becoming New Hampshire Route 32. Route 68 also passes through the town, from South Royalston through the central village to West Royalston, where it terminates at Route 32. The Springfield Terminal rail line passes through South Royalston along the south banks of the Millers River, but there is no public transportation means on this rail or otherwise. The nearest small airport is Orange Municipal Airport in Orange, with the nearest national air service being at Manchester-Boston Regional Airport in New Hampshire.

== Demographics ==
Historical population
Year	Pop.	±%
1790	1,130	—
1850	1,546	+36.8%
1860	1,486	−3.9%
1870	1,354	−8.9%
1880	1,192	−12.0%
1890	1,030	−13.6%
1900	958	−7.0%
1910	792	−17.3%
1920	819	+3.4%
1930	744	−9.2%
1940	795	+6.9%
1950	838	+5.4%
1960	800	−4.5%
1970	809	+1.1%
1980	955	+18.0%
1990	1,147	+20.1%
2000	1,254	+9.3%
2010	1,258	+0.3%
2020	1,250	−0.6%
2023*	1,276	+2.1%
* = population estimate. Source: United States census records and Population Estimates Program data.

As of the census of 2000, there were 1,254 people, 449 households, and 330 families residing in the town. The population density was 29.9 inhabitants per square mile (11.5/km^{2}). There were 526 housing units at an average density of 12.6 per square mile (4.8/km^{2}). The racial makeup of the town was 98.64% White, 0.08% African American, 0.56% Asian, 0.16% from other races, and 0.56% from two or more races. Hispanic or Latino of any race were 1.12% of the population. 15.8% were of French, 13.0% English, 11.2% Irish, 10.5% French Canadian, 8.5% American, 7.3% Finnish and 7.2% Italian ancestry according to Census 2000.

There were 449 households, out of which 36.1% had children under the age of 18 living with them, 61.7% were married couples living together, 7.1% had a female householder with no husband present, and 26.5% were non-families. 20.5% of all households were made up of individuals, and 7.1% had someone living alone who was 65 years of age or older. The average household size was 2.79 and the average family size was 3.27.

In the town, the population was spread out, with 29.1% under the age of 18, 5.8% from 18 to 24, 29.9% from 25 to 44, 25.4% from 45 to 64, and 9.8% who were 65 years of age or older. The median age was 38 years. For every 100 females, there were 107.3 males. For every 100 females age 18 and over, there were 110.2 males.

The median income for a household in the town was $44,444, and the median income for a family was $51,818. Males had a median income of $36,328 versus $27,361 for females. The per capita income for the town was $18,297. About 5.4% of families and 8.7% of the population were below the poverty line, including 10.1% of those under age 18 and 6.5% of those age 65 or over.

== Government ==
State government
State Representative(s):	Susannah Whipps (I)
State Senator(s):	Jo Comerford (D)
Governor's Councilor(s):	Tara Jacobs (D)
Federal government
U.S. Representative(s):	James P. McGovern (D-2nd District),
U.S. Senators:	Elizabeth Warren (D), Ed Markey (D)

== Library ==
The public library in Royalston was established in 1880. Phinehas Newton donated funds for a library building in 1910. In fiscal year 2008, the town of Royalston spent 2.46% ($45,220) of its budget on its public library—approximately $32 per person, per year ($42.17 adjusted for inflation to 2022).

== Education ==
The town's only public school is the Royalston Community School, a public elementary school located east of the town center on the road to Winchendon. Education at the school is provided through Grade 6. For middle and high school students the town is part of the Athol-Royalston Regional School District. There is also an independent school, called The Village School, located on South Royalston Road. It serves students from Royalston and surrounding towns, serving preschool through grade 6. The new school building on South Royalston Road at the former Camp Caravan property, opened in September 2018.

== Natural attractions ==
Royalston's natural surroundings which include three waterfalls: Royalston Falls, Doane's Falls and Spirit Falls. Outdoor recreation options can be found at Tully Lake, which is managed by the Army Corps of Engineers. Kayaking, hiking trails, a mountain bike trail and even a disc golf course are available in this area. The Trustees of Reservations also manages the Tully Lake Campground on the shores of Tully Lake.

== Notable people ==
- Alexander Bullock, politician
- Mary Floyd Cushman, doctor
- Lysander Cutler, politician
- Elmer H. Fisher, architect
- Joseph Lee Heywood, cashier
- Horace Jacobs, physician
- Whitman Jacobs, clergyman
- Abner Jones, minister
- Asahel Peck, politician
- Hamilton S. Peck, politician
- George C. Richardson, politician
- Malcolm Rogers, curator
- Nancy Amelia Woodbury Priest Wakefield, poet

== See also ==
- List of places in the United States named after people
