= Kings of Dál nAraidi =

The Kings of Dál nAraidi were rulers of one of the main kingdoms of Ulster and competed with the Dál Fiatach for the overlordship of Ulaid.

The dynasty resided at Ráith Mór, east of Antrim in the Mag Line area and emerged as the dominant group among the Cruthin of Ulaid. In the sixth and seventh centuries the Cruthin were a loose confederation of petty states with the Dal nAraidi emerging as the dominant group in the 8th century.

== Kings of Dál nAraidi and Cruthin ==
List of the Kings of Dál nAraidi;

- Cáelbad mac Cruind Ba Druí
- Sárán mac Cóelbad
- Condlae mac Cóelbad
- Fíachna Lonn mac Cóelbad (flourished 482)
- Eochaid mac Condlai (d. 553)
- Aed Brecc (d. 563)
- Báetán mac Echach
- Áed Dub mac Suibni (d. 588)
- Fiachnae mac Báetáin (Fiachnae Lurgan) (d. 626)
- Congal Cáech (Cláen) mac Scandail (d. 637)
- Lochéne mac Finguine (d. 646)
- Scandal mac Bécce (d. 646)
- Eochaid Iarlaithe mac Lurgain (d. 666)
- Máel Cáich mac Scannail (d. 666)
- Cathassach mac Lurgain (d. 668)
- Dúngal Eilni mac Scandail (d. 681)
- Cathassach mac Máele Cáich (d. 682)
- Ailill mac Dúngaile Eilni (d. 690)
- Áed Aired (d. 698)
- Cú Chuarán mac Dúngail Eilni (d. 708)
- Lethlobar mac Echach (d. 709)
- Fiachra Cossalach (d. 710)
- Dubthach mac Congail
- Eochaid mac Echach (d.715)
- Indrechtach mac Lethlobair(d.741)
- Cathussach mac Ailello (d.749)
- Flathróe mac Fiachrach (d.774)
- Cináed Ciarrge mac Cathussaig (d.776)
- Tommaltach mac Indrechtaig (d.790)
- Bressal mac Flathroe (d.792)
- Eochaid mac Bressail (d.824)
- Cináed mac Eochada (d.832)
- Flannacán mac Eochada (died 849)
- Lethlobar mac Loingsig (d.873)
- Cenn Etig mac Lethlobuir (d.900)

The later rulers of the Dál nAraidi adopted the dynastic surname Ua Loingsig (Ó Loingsigh), anglicized Lynch.

== See also ==
- Kings of Ulster
