= Dál nAraidi in Tuaiscirt =

Dál nAraidi in Tuaiscirt, also known as Dál nAraidi of the North, was a Dál nAraidi petty-kingdom and dynasty located in the over-kingdom of Ulaid, in medieval Ireland. It derived from a branch of the ruling Uí Chóelbad dynasty of Dál nAraidi Magh Line that had conquered the petty kingdom of Eilne at some point in the 7th century. The last known king of Dál nAraidi in Tuaiscirt is recorded in 883, with the territory having been taken over by the 10th century by the Uí Tuirtrí.

== History ==
In the mid-7th century the Dál nAraidi of Magh Line, ruled by the Uí Chóelbad dynasty, conquered Eilne (alias Mag Eilne) to their northwest and a branch of their dynasty seems to have settled there. This branch of the Uí Chóelbad descended from Fiachra Cáech (d. 608), brother of Fiachnae Lurgan, king of Dál nAraidi and over-king of Ulaid.

Dungal Eilni, great-grandson of Fiachra Cáech and king of Dál nAraidi, was possibly the first of this branch to be based in Eilne. The Dál nAraidi were still resisting encroachment by the Cenél nEógain branch of the Northern Uí Néill; however, in 681, Dúngal Eilni, along with his ally, Cenn Fáelad, king of Cianachta Glenn Geimin in northern County Londonderry, were killed at Dún Ceithern (modern-day Giant's Sconce in parish of Dunboe, west of River Bann) by Máel Dúin mac Máele Fithrich of the Cenél Meic Ercae of Cenél nEógain.

Eventually, this branch of the Magh Line Dál nAraidi became known as the Dál nAraidi in Tuaiscirt (Dál nAraidi of the North) and Dál nAraidi Mag nEilne. The first reference to Dál nAraidi in Tuaiscirt can be found in the Annals of Ulster under the year 824.

Between 646 and 792, the Dál nAraidi in Tuaiscirt held the overkingship of Dál nAraidi seven times, with two of that number becoming overkings of Ulaid. Cathussach mac Ailello, king of Eilne and Dál nAraidi, and claimed as having ruled the over-kingdom of Ulaid for sixteen years, was killed at Ráith Beithech (Rathveagh, County Antrim) in 749. Eochaid mac Bressal, who died in 832, was the last known king of the Dál nAraidi in Tuaiscirt to hold the over-kingship of the Dál nAraidi. The last known king of Dál nAraidi in Tuaiscirt is recorded in 883.

The church (or monastery) of Cuil Raithin on the shore of the River Bann lay in Eilne and was said to have been founded by Cairbre, who subsequently became its bishop. According to the Tripartite Life of St. Patrick, written in the 9th century, the Dál nAraidi had granted this church to Saint Patrick.

The Airgíallan dynasty of Uí Tuirtrí that lay west of the River Bann had been active east of it from as early as 776, and by the 10th century had taken control of Eilne.

== Territorial extent ==
Dál nAraidi in Tuaiscirt is said to have corresponded to the later baronies of Dunluce Lower and North East Liberties of Coleraine, and appears to correspond to the trícha cét of An Tuaiscert. It also became an Anglo-Norman cantred called Twescard, which later would absorb the cantred of Dalrede (based on Dál Riata), with these two combined cantreds forming the basis for the rural deanery of Twescard. A sub-division of in Tuaiscirt called Cuil an Tuaiscirt, meaning the "nook/corner" of Dál nAraidi in Tuaiscirt, was located in the northwest of the petty-kingdom near Coleraine. Its territory formed the basis of the later barony of North East Liberties of Coleraine.

== Bibliography ==
- Byrne, F.J. (1964). "Clann Ollaman Uaisle Emna". Studia Hibernica (4). Liverpool University Press: 54–94.
- Charles Edwards, T.M. (2006). The Chronicle of Ireland, Volume 1. Liverpool University Press. ISBN 9780853239598.
- Cosgrove, Art, ed. (2008). A New History of Ireland, II Medieval Ireland 1169-1534. Oxford University Press. ISBN 978-019-953970-3.
- McCone, Kim (1984). "Clones and Her Neighbours in the Early Period: Hints from Some Airgialla Saints' Lives". Clogher Record. 11 (3). Clogher Historical Society: 305–325. doi:10.2307/27695892. JSTOR 27695892.
- MacCotter, Paul (31 October 2014). Medieval Ireland. Territorial, Political and Economic Divisions. The Heritage Council. ISBN 9781846825576.
- Maney, Laurance (2004–2005). ""I Wonder What the King Is Doing Tonight" Looking for Arthur in All the Wrong Places". Proceedings of the Harvard Celtic Colloquium. 24/25. Department of Celtic Languages & Literatures, Harvard University: 54–72.
- Cormac McSparron; Brian Williams; Cormac Bourke (2009). The excavation of an Early Christian rath with later medieval occupation at Drumadoon, Co. Antrim. Royal Irish Academy.
