= Scandal mac Bécce =

Irish regional king, died 646

Scandal mac Bécce (died 646) was a Dal nAraide king of the Cruithne in Ulaid (Ulster). He was the grandson of Fiachra Cáech (died 608), the brother of Fiachnae mac Báetáin (died 626), a king of all Ulaid.

In the 6th and 7th centuries the Dal nAraide were part of a confederation of Cruithne tribes in Ulaid (Ulster) and were the dominant members. Scandal was an ancestor of the branch of this family which settled in Mag nEinli, a plain between the Bann and Bush in County Antrim. His son Dúngal Eilni mac Scandail (died 681) bore a byname associated with this plain. This plain had been conquered by the Dal nAraide by the middle of the seventh century.

The chronology of the Kings of Dál nAraidi is difficult to ascertain between the Battle of Mag Roth in 637 and the plague of 666. Scandal is omitted from the king lists in the Book of Leinster and the Laud Synchronisms. Scandal is called King of the Cruithne in his death obit in the annals however. he may have ruled from 637 to 646.

Scandal was involved in attacks on the Irish territory of Dál Riata in northeast County Antrim and its church Armoy. The Irish lands of Dál Riata were under attack by the Dal nAraide since the Battle of Mag Roth. The annals record that Scandal was killed but do not mention how.

Scandal mac Bécce's genealogy is recorded in Leabhar na nGenealach as; "Oilill s. Cumascach s. Flannagán s. Eochaid s. Breasal s. Flaithrí s. Fiachra Cos-salach s. Dúnghalach s. Scannal s. Béice s. Fiachra Crach, who is Teallán s. Baodán s. Eochaidh.".
