= Lethlobar mac Echach =

Lethlobar mac Echach (died 709) was a Dál nAraide king of the Cruthin in Ulaid, an over-kingdom in Ireland. He was the son of Eochaid Iarlaithe mac Lurgain (died 666), a previous king. He belonged to the main ruling dynasty of the Dál nAraide known as the Uí Chóelbad based in Magh Line. He ruled from 708 to 709.

He succeeded to the throne upon the assassination of Cú Chuarán mac Dúngail Eilni (died 708) of the Eilne branch of the family in 708. The annals record his death at the battle of Dul in Magh Eilne, between the rivers Bush and Bann in modern County Antrim, Northern Ireland. The victors are not named, one possibility is the Dal Fiatach who had just acquired the kingship of Ulaid.

Lethlobar's daughter Barrdub was said to be a wife of Bécc Bairrche mac Blathmaic (died 718) a Dál Fiatach King of Ulaid. His son Indrechtach mac Lethlobair (died 741) was a king of Dál nAraidi.
