= Dál mBuinne =

Dál mBuinne, alias Dál mBuain, meaning the "portion of Buinne", was a medieval Irish Cruthin petty-kingdom that was part of Dál nAraidi of Magh Line in the over-kingdom of Ulaid. Their eponymous ancestor was Buinn, son of the legendary Ulaid king Fergus mac Róich. It consisted in whole or part of a trícha cét. Dál mBuinne is Anglicised as Dalmunia and Dalboyn, the latter of which became the name of a medieval deanery.

Dál mBuinne contained the royal site of Dún Eachdach (Eochaidh's fort, modern-day Duneight in County Down), which had been established by the Dál Fiatach by the 9th century. In 1010 AD according to the Annals of the Four Masters, Flaithbertach Ua Néill of the Cenél nEógain led an incursion into Ulaid and burnt Dún Eachdach. South of Dún Eachdach lies the Ravernet river, which formed the boundary between Dál mBuinne and Uí Echach Cobo.

Dál mBuinne also contained the royal inauguration site of Cráeb Telcha (modern-day Crew Hill near Glenavy, County Antrim), which at first appears to have been used as such by the Dál nAraidi before its take over by the Dál Fiatach by the 9th century.

St. Patrick's slave master Míliuc mac Buan (also called Milchú) was a chief of the Dál mBuain.

== Branches ==
The following are giving as branches of the Dál mBuinne: the Galini, possibly of Leinster origin descending from the Galeóin; the Cenél nErnain; and the Dál Cuirb—also known as Dál Corb na hUamadh (Dál Cuirb of the cave) and Dál Coirbin—one of the five primtuatha (chief families) of Dál mBuinne. The Uí Coltarain (Coulter) sept were located in Dál Cuirb.

== Saints and ecclesiastical foundations ==
According to one tradition, Míliuc mac Buan's daughter Brónach had the following children: St. Fursa who spread Christianity throughout the British Isles; Mo Chaoi (Anglicised as Mahee, a pet form of St. Caolán), who founded Nendrum Monastery on Mahee Island in Strangford Lough. He is recorded as having died in 496; Colmán Comraire of Uisneach; Colmán Muilinn, founder of the church of Daire Chaechain in Dál Riata; Bishop Mac Erca, attributed as possible founder of the church of Domnuch Mór Maige Coba, County Down; and his sister Damnat, founder of the church of Cell Damhnata (Caldavnet) in Sliabh Beagh, County Monaghan.

This pedigree stemming from Brónach is stated as being entirely fictional, the common denominator being that all had links to St. Patrick, and that their linking may have been to place them all into a particular ecclesiastical-religious context.

== Deanery of Dalboyn ==
In the papal taxation of 1306 the following parishes are given as being in the rural deanery of Dalboyn: Aghagallon, Aghalee, Ballinderry, Blaris, Derryaghy, Drumbo, Drumbeg, Glenavy, Hillsborough, Lambeg, Magheragall, and Magheramesk.

The Irish districts that composed the deanery in the 16th-century where Derryvolgie, Kilultagh, and Kilwarlin. Kilultagh (from Irish: Coill Ultach, meaning "wood of the Ulster") was the largest of these and is suggested as being conterminous to Dál mBuinne. The medieval deanery of Dalboyn is now represented by the modern rural deaneries of Hillsborough and Lisburn.

The deanery is said to have extended from Glenavy in the north to Hillsborough in the south, and from Spencer's Bridge near Moira to Drum Bridge near Belfast.

== Bibliography ==
- Getty, Edmund (1855). "Notices of the Round Towers of Ulster". Ulster Journal of Archaeology. First Series. 3: 110–116.
- Hamann, Stefanie (2012). "St Fursa, the genealogy of an Irish saint—the historical person and his cult". Proceedings of the Royal Irish Academy, Section C. 112: 147–187.
- Hogan, James (1928–1929). "The Tricha Cét and Related Land-Measures". Proceedings of the Royal Irish Academy, Section C. 38: 148–235.
- MacCotter, Paul. Medieval Ireland. Territorial, Political and Economic Divisions. The Heritage Council. ISBN 9781846825576.
- MacDonald, Philip (2008). "Archaeological Evaluation of the Inaugural Landscape of Crew Hill (Craeb Telcha), County Antrim". Ulster Journal of Archaeology. Third Series. 67: 84–106.
- Meissner, John L. Gough (1932–1934). "The Place of S. Patrick's Captivity". Proceedings of the Royal Irish Academy, Section C. 41. Royal Irish Academy: 131–140.
- Orpen, Goddard H. (1913). "The Earldom of Ulster. Part II. Inquisitions Touching Carrickfergus and Antrim". The Journal of the Royal Society of Antiquaries of Ireland. Sixth Series. 3 (2): 133–143.
- Schlegel, Donald M. (2002). "Reweaving the Tapestry of Ancient Ulster". Clogher Record. 17 (3): 689–750.
