= Lethlobar mac Loingsig =

Lethlobar mac Loingsig (died 873) was a Dál nAraidi king of Ulaid, in medieval Ireland. He was the grandson of Tommaltach mac Indrechtaig, a previous king of Ulaid. He belonged to the main ruling dynasty of the Dál nAraidi known as the Uí Chóelbad based in Magh Line. He ruled as king of the Dál nAraidi from 824/849-873 and as leth-ri (co-king) of Ulaid from 857 to 871 and sole king of Ulaid from 871 to 873.

== Background ==
Lethlobar first appears in the annals in the year 828 when he inflicted a battle-route on the Vikings. He is called king of Dál nAraidi regarding this event and Lethlobar follows Eochaid mac Bressail (d.824) as king in the king lists in the Book of Leinster. However two other kings of the Dál Araidi appear in the Annals of Ulster, Cináed mac Eochada (died 832) and Flannacán mac Eochada (died 849). These last two kings as well as Eochaid mac Bressail are however referred to as kings of Dál nAraidi in the north and they belonged to a sept descended from Fiachra Cossalach (died 710) who may have been related to the northern Eilne branch. There was a branch of the Dal nAraidi in west County Down in the south, the Uí Echach Cobo, but they were always referred to as Kings of Coba (or Cuib) in the annals. Whether Lethlobar was king earlier or not he was definitely king from 849 on.

In 857 the Dál Fiatach king of Ulaid, Matudán mac Muiredaig died and Lethlobar became king in a joint-kingship with Cathalán mac Indrechtaig of the Leath Cathail branch of the Dál Fiatach. Cathalán was assassinated at the instigation of the high king Áed Findliath of the Northern Uí Neill in 871 and Lethlobar became sole king. At his death notice in the annals he is referred to as an old man.

His son Cenn Étig mac Lethlobuir (died 900) was also a ruler of all Ulaid and succeeded him as King of Dál nAraidi. His daughter Barrdub was married to Áed mac Eochocáin (died 919), a Dál Fiatach king of Ulaid.
