= Cathassach mac Lurgain =

Cathassach mac Lurgain (or Cathassach mac Fíachnai) (died 668) was a Dal nAraide king of the Cruithne in Ulaid (Ulster). He was the son of Fiachnae mac Báetáin (died 626) a king of all Ulaid and possible high king and brother of Eochaid Iarlaithe mac Lurgain (died 666), a King of the Dal nAraide. He ruled from 666 to 668.

He belonged to the main ruling dynasty of the Dal nAraide known as the Uí Chóelbad based in Mag Line, east of Antrim town in modern county Antrim. In the 6th and 7th centuries the Dal nAraide were part of a confederation of Cruithne tribes in Ulaid (Ulster) and were the dominant members.

In 668 he clashed with the Ulaid (Dal Fiatach) at that time ruled by Blathmac mac Máele Cobo (died 670) and was slain at the battle of Fertas (near Belfast).
