= Fiachnae mac Áedo Róin =

Fiachnae mac Áedo Róin (died 789) was a Dál Fiatach ruler of the over-kingdom of Ulaid in Ireland. He reigned from 750 to 789. He was the son of Áed Róin (died 735) and brother of Bressal mac Áedo Róin (died 750), previous kings. This family had their base in modern-day County Down, Northern Ireland.

== Background ==
His father had been slain in battle in 735 by the High King of Ireland Áed Allán (died 743) of the Cenél nEógain and the kingship of Ulaid passed to the rival Dál nAraidi of southern County Antrim in the person of Cathussach mac Ailello (died 749). However, in 749 Cathussach was killed at Ráith Beithech (Rathveagh, modern County Antrim) probably in the interest of the Dál Fiatach and Fiachnae's brother, Bressal, became king. Bressal himself was killed in 750 but the Dál Fiatach retained the kingship. The historian Professor Byrne, however, believes that it is probable there was an interregnum in Ulaid between the reigns of Áed Róin and Fiachnae.

== Reign ==
Fiachnae restored the fortunes of the Dál Fiatach during his long reign. In 759, he became involved in a dispute among the churchmen of Armagh. Fiachnae supported the abbot Fer-dá-Chrích versus a priest named Airechtach who had the support of Dúngal mac Amalgado of the Uí Néill of Brega. Fiachnae defeated them at the Battle of Emain Macha, near Armagh, and Dúngal and his ally Donn Bó mac Con Brettan, king of Fir Rois, were slain.

In 761 Fiachnae defeated the Uí Echach Cobo (a branch of the Dál nAraidi) of the west part of County Down in the Battle of Áth Duma, where their king Ailill mac Feidlimid was slain. The Uí Echach Coba were to suffer another defeat in 776, this time at the hands of the Airthir (an Airgialla tribe of modern County Armagh).

The Dál nAraidi proper engaged in internecine civil wars in 776 and 783. In one of these conflicts in 776, Fiachnae's son Eochaid gave support to the claimant Tommaltach mac Indrechtaig (died 790), and they defeated and slew the king of Dál nAraidi, Cinaed Ciarrge mac Cathussaig, and his ally Dúngal, king of the Uí Tuirtri (an Airgialla tribe west of Lough Neagh) in the Battle of Drong.

The power of Fiachnae was such that the high king Donnchad Midi (died 797) sought a conference with him at Inis na Ríg in eastern Brega. However, mutual distrust prevented Fiachnae from coming ashore and Donnchad from going out to sea to meet him. The purpose of the meeting may have been to delimit spheres of influence. Donnchad may have been seeking to settle affairs involving the Uí Echach Coba and Airthir and the border region of the Conailli Muirtheimne (in modern County Louth).

== Expansion of Dál Fiatach influence ==
The expansion of the Dál Fiatach northwards to the shores of Lough Neagh began in his reign, and this cut off the Dál nAraidi proper from their kinsmen the Uí Echach Coba in the south. Fiachnae also gave his patronage to Bangor, traditionally a Dál nAraidi monastery. He also converted Downpatrick into a royal monastery (or this was done by his father). The first recorded abbot of Downpatrick in the annals has a death notice in 753.

His sons Eochaid mac Fiachnai (died 810) and Cairell mac Fiachnai (died 819) were Kings of Ulster. Another son, Loingsech mac Fiachnai (died 800) was abbot of Downpatrick. Fiachnae's nephew Diarmait Ua Áedo Róin (died 825) was a Céli Dé (Culdee) church reformer and founded the monastery of Diseart Diarmad (Castledermot, modern County Kildare) in 812, renewing the ties of Bangor with Leinster.
