= Cathalán mac Indrechtaig =

King of Ulaid

Cathalán mac Indrechtaig (died 871) was a Dál Fiatach king of Ulaid, which is now Ulster, Ireland. He belonged to a branch of the Dal Fiatach called the Leth Cathail centered in the Lecale barony of modern County Down. He ruled from 857 to 871 as leth-rí (half-king or co-ruler) of Ulaid.

His grandfather Tommaltach mac Cathail (died 789) had made a bid for the crown but was defeated and slain in battle by Eochaid mac Fiachnai (died 810) of the main Dal Fiatach branch. His father, Indrechtach mac Tommaltaig, is only mentioned in the Annals of Innisfallen which state that he was a co-ruler of Ulaid. This is not confirmed by other annals or king lists however.

Cathalán succeeded to the throne of Ulaid in 857 as co-ruler with Lethlobar mac Loingsig (died 873) of the Dál nAraidi sept of modern County Antrim. Though not listed in the king lists, the annals award him the title of co-ruler at his death notice. He was killed treacherously at the instigation of the high king Áed Findliath (died 879) of the northern Uí Néill.

He had a son named Cummascach. His brother Máel Mocheirge mac Indrechtaig (died 896) was also a leth-rí of Ulaid.
