= Bressal mac Áedo Róin =

Bressal mac Áedo Róin (died 750) was a Dál Fiatach ruler of the over-kingdom of Ulaid in Ireland. He reigned from 749 to 750. He was the son of Áed Róin (died 735), a previous king. This family had their base in modern-day County Down, Northern Ireland.

His father had been slain in battle in 735 by the High King of Ireland Áed Allán (died 743) of the Cenél nEógain and the kingship of Ulaid passed to the rival Dál nAraidi of southern County Antrim. However, in 749 the Dál nAraidi king of Ulaid Cathussach mac Ailello was killed at Ráith Beithech (Rathveagh, modern County Antrim) probably in the interest of the Dál Fiatach and Bressal became king. Bressal himself was killed in 750 but the Dál Fiatach retained the kingship.

The king list in the Book of Leinster places his reign immediately after his father's and state he ruled for one year. This is the chronology followed by the later and more synthetic Annals of the Four Masters which state that he was killed at Dun Celtchair (near Downpatrick). The historian Professor Byrne believes that it is probable there was an interregnum in Ulaid between the reigns of Áed Róin and Bressal's brother Fiachnae mac Áedo Róin (died 789).
