= Áed Róin =

Ruler in the Kingdom of Ulaid

Áed Róin mac Bécce Bairrche (died 735) was the Dál Fiatach ruler of the over-kingdom of Ulaid in Ireland. He reigned from 708 to 735. He was the son of Bécc Bairrche mac Blathmaic, (died 718), a previous king of Ulaid who had abdicated in 707 to become a pilgrim.

== History ==
Opposition to Áed's rule from the various branches of the Dál nAraidi had to be overcome at first. In 712 the Ulaid (Dal Fiatach) were overthrown and Dubthach mac Bécce, Áed's brother was slain. In 714 a battle was fought between the sons of Becc Bairrche and the son of Bressal mac Fergusa (died 685) of the Uí Echach Cobo in which the Dal Fiatach were victors.

In 735 the High King of Ireland Áed Allán of the Cenél nEógain defeated Áed Róin at Faughart, in Magh Muirtheimhne in modern County Louth. Áed Róin and Conchad mac Cúanach of Ui Echach Coba were slain. This conflict had arisen as a result of a profanation of a church, Cell Conna, dear to Áed Allán by one of Áed Róin's men, for which Congus, abbot of Armagh demanded vengeance. Áed Róin's head was cut off. This victory resulted in the loss of Conailli Muirtheimne overlordship by the Ulaid to the Uí Néill of their influence in Louth.

Sons of Áed Róin include: Bressal mac Áedo Róin and Fiachnae mac Áedo Róin, who also became kings of Ulaid; Blathmac, the eponymous ancestor of the Uí Blathmaic; and Diarmait, the founder of the monastic settlement at Castledermot.

== See also ==
- Kings of Ulster
