= Muiredach mac Eochada =

Muiredach mac Eochada (died 839) was a Dal Fiatach king of Ulaid, medieval Ireland. He was the son of Eochaid mac Fiachnai (died 810), a previous king. He ruled from 825-839.

His father had been defeated in battle by his own brother Cairell mac Fiachnai (died 819) in 809 and died the next year. Cairell at that point became King of Ulaid. In 819 Muiredach obtained revenge for his father by defeating and slaying Cairell in a skirmish. This gave him the kingship of the Dal Fiatach but he did not acquire the kingship of Ulaid which went to Máel Bressail mac Ailillo (died 825) of the Uí Echach Cobo. He then became king of all Ulaid in 825.

Viking raids had begun in Ireland and Ulster was one of the victims. The monastery of Bangor was attacked in 823 and 824 and in 825 the Norse plundered the Dal Fiatach royal monastery at Dún Lethglaise (Downpatrick) and they burned Mag nBili (Moville) another monastery in county Down. However the Ulaid were able to inflict a route on the Norse in Mag Inis (Lecale) that same year. Viking raids included an attack on Loch Bricrenn (Loughbrickland, modern County Down) in the territory of the Uí Echach Cobo in 833.

In 827 a conflict within the important church at Armagh led to war. Cummascach mac Cathail of the Uí Cremthainn, king of the Airgíalla, expelled the King of Ailech's confessor Éogan Mainistrech from Armagh, installing his own half-brother, Artrí mac Conchobair as abbot of Armagh. The King of Ailech Niall Caille (died 846) of the northern Ui Neill raised an army and marched on Armagh. Muiredach gave his support to Cummascah and brought his forces to aid the Airgialla. This resulted in the Battle at Leth Cam, near modern Kilmore, County Armagh. It was a decisive victory for Niall and northern Uí Néill. Cummascach and his brother Congalach were killed while Muiredach survived the battle. The defeat broke the power of the Airgíalla who were thereafter subject to the northern Uí Néill kings. Artrí was deposed from the see of Armagh and Niall installed Éogan Mainistrech. Hostility to the Ui Neill resulted in the killing of the son of Niall Caille, Cináed, by the Ulaid in 835.

The Annals of Innisfallen note the death of Indrechtach mac Tommaltaig of the Leth Cathail (Lecale) branch of the Dal Fiatach as co-ruler of Ulaid in 835. This is not confirmed by the other annals however. In 839 Muiredach was killed by his own kinsmen (named as Áed and Óengus, his brothers). In this notice he is called King of Conchobar's Province, another name for Ulster. His son Matudán mac Muiredaig (died 857) succeeded him. His daughter Gormalaith Rapach ("the harsh") married Áed Findliath (died 879) high king of Ireland.

== Family tree ==
    Eochaid mac Fiachnai, died 810.
    |
    |____________________________________
    |                             |    |
    |                             |    |
    Muiredach mac Eochada         Áed  Óengus
    |
    |_______________________________
    |                              |
    |                              |
    Matudán mac Muiredaig          Gormalaith Rapach, died 840.
                                 = Áed Findliath
