= Cathassach mac Máele Cáich =

Cathassach mac Máele Cáich (died 682) or Cathassach mac Máele Dúin' was a Dal nAraide king of the Cruthin. He was the son of Máel Cáich mac Scannail (died 666), a previous king. He ruled from 681 to 682.

In the 6th and 7th centuries the Dal nAraide were part of a confederation of Cruthin tribes in Ulaid and were the dominant members. Cathassach is styled king of the Cruthin in the annals.

British marauders were active around the turn of the 8th century. In 682 Cathassach fought with Britons at the Battle of Ráith Mór, east of Antrim, capital of the kingdom. Cathassach was slain as was another Cruthin king, Ultán son of Dícuill of the Latharna, modern County Antrim).

== See also ==
- Kings of Dál nAraidi
