= Lynch (surname) =

Family name

- Pronunciation: /lɪntʃ/
- Language: English

Lynch is an Anglo-Normans surname of English and Irish origin.

== English origin ==
In England, the surname is derived from the Norman-French de Lench and Kentish hlinc (meaning 'hill').

A Lynch family originated at Cranbrook in Kent (where William Lynch co-founded Cranbrook School, Kent, in 1518) and from Tudor times were seated at "The Groves" in the village of Staple near Canterbury in Kent (the house was demolished in 1843 on the death of Lady Lynch). Their coat of arms consist of Three Lynxes Rampant and most of the family are buried at the Lynch Chancel in Staple parish church. Notable members of this family include:

- The Right Honourable Simon Lynch, Squire of "The Groves" at Staple and member of parliament for Sandwich (1495–1573)
- Sir Thomas Lynch, Governor of British Jamaica
- Dr John Lynch, Dean and Archdeacon of Canterbury Cathedral, and Squire of "The Groves" at Staple, who married a daughter of William Wake, Archbishop of Canterbury,
- Sir William Lynch, Squire of "The Groves" at Staple, diplomat, art collector and member of parliament for Canterbury

== Irish origin ==
There are several different unrelated Irish families of which Lynch is the anglicized form, including:

- According to historian C. Thomas Cairney, the O'Lynches were from the Dal nAraide tribe who came to Ireland with the Cruthin who were the first wave of Celts to come to Ireland from between about 800 and 500 BC. However, Cairney also states that the Lynches came to Ireland with the Norman invasion of the late 12th century.
- Ó Loingsigh, meaning "descendant of Loingseach" (having or belonging to a fleet of ships), which was anglicized as Lynchy, Lynskey and Lindsey. According to the early twentieth century genealogical authority, the Rev. Patrick Wolfe, there were several different kindreds with this name in early medieval Ireland. One group were amongst the lords of the kingdom of Dál Riata in north-eastern Ulster during the 11th century until they were displaced by the Normans. Other Ó Loingsigh families were to be found in Tipperary, Briefne (modern day Leitrim) and Thomond (present day Clare and Limerick). In West Cork, a group of Ó Loingsigh were a branch of the Corca Laoighe.
- Mac Loingsigh – Clynch, Lynch, Mac Glinchy, MacClintock, McClinton
- Mac Loingseacháin – Lynchseanaun, Lynch
- de Lench, an Anglo-Norman name, which became one of the Tribes of Galway. It is this wealthy landowning line that was elevated to the baronetage as the Lynch baronets of Galway. The family line later extended to Argentine upon the emigration of Patrick Lynch.

== See also ==
- Kings of Dál nAraidi
- Lynch leaders of Galway
- Irish clans
