= Fergus mac Áedáin =

Fergus mac Áedáin (died 692) was king of Ulaid from 674. He belonged to a branch of the Dal nAraide known as the Uí Echach Cobo in the west part of county Down. They were distinct from the main branch located in County Antrim who were known as Kings of the Cruithne in this period. He was the son of Áedán mac Mongain (died 616), a previous king of Cobo.

He was the first member of the Dal nAraide to hold the throne since death of Congal Cáech at Mag Roth in 639. He was of the Ui Echach Coba branch of the Dal nAraide and was the son of Áedán mac Mongain (d. 616). No mention is made of why he became king but the previous holders, the Dal Fiatach had been guilty of some kin slaying.

In 691, the annals record the despoiling of the Cruithne and the Ulaid by the men of Dál Riata

His son Bressal mac Fergusa (d. 685), called king of Cobo by the Annals of Tigernach, died of disease which was rampant at this time. He himself was slain by his own people in 692 according to the Annals of the Four Masters, whereas the Annals of Ulster simply state that he died.

He married Máel Teglaig, daughter of Máel Odar (died 639), king of the Airthir, a tribe of the Airgialla in County Armagh. Their daughter, Ériu, married Ailill mac Cennfáelad (died 702), King of the Cianachta Glenn Geimin (in what is modern day County Londonderry.) Besides his son Bressal, he had a son named Máel Cothaig.

== See also ==
- Kings of Ulster
