= Eochaid mac Fiachnai =

Eochaid mac Fiachnai (died 810) was a Dal Fiatach king of Ulaid, which is now Ulster, Ireland. He was the son of Fiachnae mac Áedo Róin (died 789), a previous king. He ruled from 790 to 810.

Eochaid first appears in the annals in 776. In that year he gave his support to Tommaltach mac Indrechtaig (died 790) in a civil war among the rival Dal nAraide family. They defeated and slew the incumbent king Cináed Ciarrge mac Cathussaig and his ally, Dúngal king of the Uí Tuirtri (an Airgialla tribe west of Lough Neagh) at the Battle of Drong.

His father had restored the fortunes of the Dal Fiatach dynasty but upon his death a succession struggle broke out. Eochaid was challenged for the kingship by his kinsmen Tommaltach mac Cathail. Tommaltach was the great-grandson of Óengus, son of Máel Cobo mac Fiachnai (died 647) king of Ulaid and this branch (called the Cenél nÓengusa) threatened to be excluded from the throne. Tommaltach was defeated and slain in battle by Eochaid. However Tommlatach's branch of the family remained based in Leth Cathail (Lecale)-"Cathal's Half" in southern modern County Down (also known as Mag Inis).

Tommaltach mac Indrechtaig of Dal nAraide had profited by the civil war among the Dal Fiatach to acquire the throne of all Ulaid. He died the next year in 790 and in that year the annals also record a slaughter of the Dal Fiatach by the Dál nAraidi. Whether this occurred before or after Tommaltach's death is uncertain. Eochaid became King of Ulaid in 790.

In 801 The Ulaid went to war with the Uí Echach Cobo in the west part of county Down, probably to impose their authority. The Ulaid were victorious and slew the King of Coba, Eochu mac Aililla. On the side of the Ulaid, Cairell mac Cathail of the Leth Cathail branch was slain.

In 809 the high king Áed Oirdnide campaigned against Ulaid and defeated them ravaging from the Bann to Strangford Lough. The motive for this conflict was apparently the killing of Dúnchú, superior of Tulach Léis (Tullylisk, County Down), by the Ulaid. A civil war then followed in which Eochaid was defeated by his brother Cairell mac Fiachnai (died 819). The annals report that Eochaid escaped from this battle and historians place his death in 810.

Eochaid may be associated with the establishment of Dún Echdach (Duneight) which became the royal seat of the Dal Fiatach as they shifted their power northwards by the 9th century from their old royal seat at Downpatrick. The sons of Eochaid included Muiredach mac Eochada (died 839), a King of Ulaid, and Áed mac Eochada who fathered three kings of Ulaid.
