= Fíachna Lonn mac Cóelbad =

Fíachna Lonn mac Cóelbad ("the fierce") (flourished 482) was a Dal nAraide king in modern County Antrim, Ulster. He was the son of Cáelbad mac Cruind Ba Druí, a high king of Ireland and King of Ulster and brother of the previous Dal nAraide kings Sárán mac Cóelbad and Condlae mac Cóelbad.

He is listed in king lists as successor to his brothers. In some annals he is mentioned as a participant in the Battle of Ochae (Faughan Hill, near Kells) in 482 which overthrew the high king Ailill Molt of Connacht. The Annals of Ulster call him the son of the King of Dal nAraide. While other later annals such as the Chronicum Scotorum call him King of Dal nAraide.

The descendants of his brother Condlae were to provide the ruling line the Uí Chóelbad of Dal nAraide.
