= Eochaid mac Condlai =

Eochaid mac Condlai (died 553) was a king of Ulaid from the Dal nAraide. He was the son of Condlae mac Cóelbad, also a king of Dal nAraide and grandson of the high king and King of Ulster Cáelbad mac Crond Ba Druí. He belonged to the main ruling dynasty of the Dal nAraide known as the Uí Chóelbad based in Mag Line, east of Antrim town in modern county Antrim.

The Dal Fiatach had dominated the kingship of Ulaid since the late 5th century and Eochaid is the first king of Ulaid from his sept since his grandfather's time. According to the king lists in the Book of Leinster, he succeeded his uncle Fíachna Lonn mac Cóelbad as king of Dal nAraide. He succeeded Cairell mac Muiredaig Muinderg of the Dal Fiatach as king of Ulaid. He ruled from 532 to 553.

His son Báetán Cáech was possibly also a king of Dal nAraide and was father of the Ulaid king Fiachnae mac Báetáin (died 626). The annals state that he was ancestor of the Ui Echach of Ulaid. However this term has many uses in Ulaid and the genealogies in Rawlinson do not agree with this. It is more probable they descended from a brother of Eochaid's grandfather, Cáelbad mac Crond Ba Druí, named Eochu.
