= Crundmáel mac Suibni =

King of Ailech, 7th century Ireland

Crundmáel mac Suibni (died c. 660) was a King of Ailech and head of the Cenél nEógain branch of the northern Uí Néill. He was the son of the high king of Ireland Suibne Menn (died 628). According to the Laud Synchronisms he succeeded his uncle Ernaine mac Fiachnai (died 636) and ruled for 24 years which gives a possible reign of 636-660 as King of Ailech.

In 637 the naval Battle of Sailtir was fought between the Cenél nEógain and the Dál Riata on one side and the Cenél Conaill on the other with the victory going to the Cenél Conaill. They were acting as allies of Congal Cáech, King of Ulaid versus the high king Domnall mac Áedo (died 642) of the Cenél Conaill. It is probable that this was Cenél maic Ercae branch of the Cenél nEógain and not the Cenél Feradaig branch to which Crundmáel belonged as Congal Cáech had slain his father Suibne in 628.

The only event recorded of his reign is the Battle of Flescaig, where he defeated Cumascach, son of Ailill, chief of Uí Cremhthainn of the Airgíalla in 656 who was slain.

His son Ferg mac Crundmaíl (died c. 670) was also a King of Ailech. Another son, Máel Tuile, was father of Fland mac Máele Tuile (died 700) and Urthuile mac Máele Tuile, also Kings of Ailech.
