= Ailill mac Dúngaile Eilni =

Ailill mac Dúngaile Eilni (died 690) was a Dál nAraidi king of the Cruthin in Ulaid, an over-kingdom in medieval Ireland. He was the son of Dúngal Eilni mac Scandail (died 681), a previous king. He ruled from 682 to 690.

In the 6th and 7th centuries, the Dál nAraidi were part of a confederation of Cruthin tribes in Ulaid and were the dominant dynasty. Ailill belonged to a branch of this family settled in Eilne, a plain between the Bann and Bush rivers in modern-day County Antrim, Northern Ireland. He is styled "King of the Cruithne" in the Fragmentary Annals' of Ireland. The annals record that Ailill was killed, but the circumstances are not mentioned.

His brother Cú Chuarán mac Dúngail Eilni (died 708) was also king of Dál nAraidi as well as of Ulaid as was his son Cathussach mac Ailello (died 749).
