= Fland mac Máele Tuile =

King of Ailech, Ireland (died 700)

Fland mac Máele Tuile (died 700), also Flann Finn or Flann Albus was a King of Ailech and head of the Cenél nEógain branch of the northern Uí Néill. He was the grandson of Crundmáel mac Suibni (died circa 660), a previous King of Ailech and greatgrandson of the high king of Ireland Suibne Menn (died 628).

He was a member of the Cenél Feradaig branch of this dynasty which was in conflict with the Cenél maic Ercae branch and had dominated the kingship for much of the 7th century. In 681, along with his allies the Cianachta Glenn Geimin (in modern County Londonderry), he defeated the incumbent king of Ailech, Máel Dúin mac Máele Fithrich of the Cenél maic Ercae, who was slain at the Battle of Bla Sléibe (in modern County Londonderry).

The Laud Synchronisms give a 12-year reign to Fland followed by a 6-year reign assigned to a brother named Urthuile. Together their reigns cover the years 681-700 but the exact chronology is unknown. Fland is listed as one of the guarantors to the Cáin Adomnáin (Law of the Innocents) at the Synod of Birr in 697; as his brother Urthuile but Fland has the title of king. In 700 the annals record the expulsion of Urthuile from the kingship and he went to Britain. The annals then record the death of Fland in the same year. According to the Chronicum Scotorum, he was killed.

The Cenél maic Ercae branch went on to dominate the kingship of Ailech and eventually acquire the high kingship for the Cenél nEógain. The genealogies give Fland a son named Díchon whose great-great grandson Máel Pátric was founder of the Kilpatricks, who possessed districts in the east of Tyrone.

== Notes ==
Preceded by Máel Dúin mac Máele Fithrich	King of Ailech; 681–700	Succeeded by Fergal mac Máele Dúin
