= Indrechtach mac Lethlobair =

Indrechtach mac Lethlobair (died 741) was a Dal nAraide king of the Cruithne in Ulaid (Ulster). He was the son of Lethlobar mac Echach (died 709), a previous king. He belonged to the main ruling dynasty of the Dal nAraide known as the Uí Chóelbad based in Mag Line, east of Antrim town in modern county Antrim.

It is uncertain at what date he acquired the kingship of Dal nAraide. The death of Dub dá Inber mac Congalaig as King of Cruithne (the title used for them at this time in the annals) is recorded in 727. Indrechtach is also listed before Cathussach mac Ailello (died 749) in the king lists but it is possible that Cathussach resigned the kingship to Indrechtach upon becoming King of Ulaid in 735. This would place his reign as 735-741.

Professor Byrne, however, believes that there may have been an interregnum in Ulaid between 735-750. This would give a possible reign for Indrechtach over the Dal nAraide from 727-741 if this were true and would explain his placing in the king lists of the Dal nAraide.

His son Tommaltach mac Indrechtaig (died 790) was a King of Dal nAraide and of all Ulaid.
