= Máel Bressail mac Ailillo =

Máel Bressail mac Ailello (died 825) was a king of Ulaid, which is now Ulster, Ireland. He belonged to a branch of the Dal nAraide known as the Uí Echach Cobo in the west part of county Down. He ruled as King of Ulaid from 819-825.

He was the first member of the Uí Echach Cobo to hold the throne of all Ulaid since Fergus mac Áedáin (died 692) who was his great-great grandfather. Both his father Ailill mac Feidlimid (died 761) and brother Eochu mac Ailillo (died 801) had been Kings of Coba. His exact year of accession to the throne of Coba is unknown though his brother is the last king mentioned in the Annals of Ulster prior to him. Both his father and brother had been slain in struggles with the Dal Fiatach over kings of Ulaid.

In 819 Máel Bressail was able to acquire the throne of Ulaid after internal squabbling among the Dal Fiatach. The kinglists such as those in the Book of Leinster list him as king but only give him a reign of two years. The Annals of Ulster as well do not give him the title King of Ulaid at his death notice. However the death notice of Dal nAraide kings of Ulaid is often biased in the annals in favor of the Dal Fiatach as the "true" Ulaid.

Viking raids were common on Ulster in this period and the monastery of Bangor was attacked twice in 823 and 824.

His son Cernach mac Máele Bressail (died 853) was also a King of Coba.
