= Ferg mac Crundmaíl =

7th-century Irish monarch

Ferg mac Crundmaíl (died circa 668) was a King of Ailech and head of the Cenél nEógain branch of the northern Uí Néill. He was the son of Crundmáel mac Suibni (died circa 660) and grandson of the high king of Ireland Suibne Menn (died 628)

According to the Laud Synchronisms he succeeded his father Crundmáel who ruled for 24 years while he himself ruled for 8 years. His father succeeded his uncle Ernaine mac Fiachnai (died 636) which gives Ferg a possible reign of 660-668 as King of Ailech. There is no mention of him in the Irish annals.

== Notes ==
Preceded by Crundmáel mac Suibni	King of Ailech; 660-668	Succeeded by Máel Dúin mac Máele Fithrich
