= Fiachra Cossalach =

Fiachra Cossalach (died 710) was a Dál nAraidi king of the Cruthin in Ulaid, a medieval over-kingdom in Ireland. He ruled from 709-710.

Fiachra Cossalach was a son of Dúngal Eilni mac Scandail (died 681) and hence a member of the Eilne branch of the family. In the Annals of Ulster he is referred to as the son of Dúngal in his death notice in the annals.

Fiachra is mentioned as one of the guarantors of the Cáin Adomnáin at the Synod of Birr in 697 as king of the Cruithin at a time when Áed Aired (died 698) was considered to be king. Fiachra was king at a time when the Dál nAraidi were involved in some infighting that resulted in three kings in three years. Fiachra himself met his death in 710, slain among the Cruithin.

His son Flathróe mac Fiachrach (died 774) was also king of Dál nAraidi.
