= Máel Fithrich mac Áedo =

King in 7th century Ireland

Máel Fithrich mac Áedo (died 630) was a King of Ailech and head of the Cenél nEógain branch of the northern Uí Néill. He was the son of the high king of Ireland Áed Uaridnach (died 612). He ruled in Ailech from 628 to 630.

The branch of the Cenél nEógain that he belonged to was called the Cenél maic Ercae and they had dominated the kingship of Ailech until the reign of his predecessor Suibne Menn (died 628) of the Cenél Feradaig branch. In 630 these two branches of the family clashed at the Battle of Leitheirbe and Máel Fithrich was slain fighting against Suibne's brother Ernaine mac Fiachnai (died 638). The Cenél Feradaig branch then dominated the kingship for most of the 7th century.

His son Máel Dúin mac Máele Fithrich (died 681) was also a King of Ailech.
