= Eochaid Iarlaithe =

Eochaid Iarlaithe mac Lurgain (died 666) was a Dal nAraide king of the Cruithne in Ulaid (Ulster). He was the son of Fiachnae mac Báetáin (died 626) a king of all Ulaid and possible high king. He belonged to the main ruling dynasty of the Dal nAraide known as the Uí Chóelbad based in Mag Line, east of Antrim town in modern county Antrim.

In the 6th and 7th centuries the Dal nAraide were part of a confederation of Cruithne tribes in Ulaid (Ulster) and were the dominant members. The chronology of the Kings of Dál nAraidi is difficult to ascertain between the Battle of Mag Roth in 637 and the plague of 666. He most likely ruled from 646 to 666. The Annals of Ulster give him the title King of the Cruithne at his death obituary in 666 and he is listed in the king lists.

A Middle Irish language verse tale of the 10th century, Fingal Rónáin (The Kinslaying of Rónán), also known as Aided Máele Fothartaig meic Rónáin (The Killing of Máel Fothartaig mac Rónáin) has details regarding Eochaid preserved in the Fragmentary Annals of Ireland. Eochaid's young daughter was married to the older Rónán Crach mac Áedo of the Uí Máil in Leinster, however she fell in love with her stepson Máel Fothartaig and attempted to seduce him. He however refused her advances and so she framed him telling her husband that he had tried to force himself upon her. As a result, her husband killed his son. Later the foster brothers of Máel Fothartaig killed Eochaid Iarlaithe in revenge.

Eochaid's son Lethlobar mac Echach (died 709) was also a king of Dal nAraide.
