= Eilne =

Medieval Irish Kingdom

Eilne, also spelt as Eilni, alias Mag nEilne, was a medieval Irish Cruthin petty-kingdom in the over-kingdom of Ulaid. It lay between the River Bann and River Bush, and was centered on Magh nEilne, the "plain of Eilne", spanning north-east County Londonderry and north-west County Antrim, in present-day Northern Ireland. Eilne may represent the name of an original population grouping, though even in the Old Irish period who they were was forgotten.

The end result of conquest first by the Dál nAraidi and then the Uí Tuirtri resulted in Eilne later becoming known simply as An Tuaiscert, which survived into the late medieval period as the name of a medieval deanery and the Anglo-Norman cantred of Twescard.

== History ==
In 563 the battle of Móin Daire Lothair (modern-day Moneymore) took place between an alliance of Cruthin kings and the Northern Uí Néill. The Cruthin suffered a devastating defeat and lost the territories of Ard Eólairg (Magilligan peninsula) and the Lee, which both lay west of the River Bann, with the Northern Uí Néill settling their Airgíalla allies in Eilne. The Cruthin afterwards consolidated themselves in the Dál nAraidi.

In the mid-7th century the Dál nAraidi of Magh Line conquered Eilne to their north-west and one of their dynasty seems to have settled there, with this branch eventually being known as the Dál nAraidi in Tuaiscirt.

In 681, Dungal Eilni, king of the Cruthin, who was of the Dál nAraidi in Tuaiscirt was killed at Dún Ceithern (modern-day Giant's Sconce in parish of Dunboe, west of River Bann) along with the king of Cianachta Glenn Geimin by Máel Dúin mac Máele Fithrich of the Cenél Meic Ercae of Cenél nEógain.

Cathussach mac Ailello, king of Eilne and Dál nAraidi, and claimed as having ruled the over-kingdom of Ulaid for sixteen years, was killed at Ráith Beithech (Rathveagh, County Antrim) in 749.

At the end of the 8th-century, the Airgíallan Uí Tuirtri, whose kingdom lay west of the River Bann, started to migrate into Eilne due to pressure from the encroaching Cenél nEógain.

Eochaid mac Bressal, who died in 832, was the last known king of the Dál nAraidi in Tuaiscirt to hold the over-kingship of the Dál nAraidi.

By the 10th-century, Eilne was under the control of the Uí Tuirtri who had also moved their client kingdom of Fir Lí eastwards as well.

=== List of kings ===
Below is a list of the known kings of Eilne:

- Dúngal Eilni mac Scandail, of the Dál nAraidi in Tuaiscirt, king of Dál nAraidi and the Cruthin after 668 to 681.
- Ailill mac Dúngaile Eilni, of the Dál nAraidi in Tuaiscirt, king of Dál nAraidi and the Cruthin 682-690.
- Cú Chuarán mac Dúngail Eilni, of the Dál nAraidi in Tuaiscirt, king of Dál nAraidi from 698 to 708, and of Ulaid from 707 to 708.
- Fiachra Cossalach, of the Dál nAraidi in Tuaiscirt, king of Dál nAraidi and the Cruthin 709-710.
- Flathróe mac Fiachrach, of the Dál nAraidi in Tuaiscirt, king of Dál nAraidi and the Cruthin 749-774. Was the last king to be called king of the Cruthin.
- Cathussach mac Ailello, of the Dál nAraidi in Tuaiscirt, king of Ulaid in the mid-8th century.
- Cináed Ciarrge mac Cathussaig, of the Dál nAraidi in Tuaiscirt, king of Ulaid from 774 to 776.
- Eochaid mac Bressal, of the Dál nAraidi in Tuaiscirt, died 832, the last king of Eilne from this dynasty.

== Religious foundations ==
The church (or monastery) of Cuil Raithin on the shore of the River Bann lay in Eilne and was said to have been founded by Cairbre, who subsequently became its bishop. According to the Tripartite Life of St. Patrick, written in the 9th-century, the Dál nAraidi had granted this church to Saint Patrick.

== Territorial expanse ==
Dál nAraidi in Tuaiscirt is said to have corresponded to the later baronies of Dunluce Lower and North East Liberties of Coleraine, and appears to correspond to the trícha cét of An Tuaiscert, which became the basis for the medieval deanery and Anglo-Norman cantred of Twescard. A sub-division of in Tuaiscirt called Cuil an Tuaiscirt, meaning the "nook/corner" of Dál nAraidi in Tuaiscirt, was located in the north-west of the petty-kingdom near Coleraine. Its territory would form the basis of the later barony of North East Liberties of Coleraine.

== Bibliography ==
- Byrne, F.J. (1964). "Clann Ollaman Uaisle Emna". Studia Hibernica (4). Liverpool University Press: 54–94. doi:10.3828/sh.1964.4.3. S2CID 241365953.
- Byrne, F.J. (1971). "Tribes and tribalism in Early Ireland". Ériu. 22. Royal Irish Academy: 128–166.
- Cosgrove, Art, ed. (2008). A New History of Ireland, II Medieval Ireland 1169-1534. Oxford University Press. ISBN 978-019-953970-3.
- Charles Edwards, T.M. (2006). The Chronicle of Ireland, Volume 1. Liverpool University Press. ISBN 9780853239598.
- Cormac McSparron; Brian Williams; Cormac Bourke (2009). The excavation of an Early Christian rath with later medieval occupation at Drumadoon, Co. Antrim. Royal Irish Academy.
- Maney, Laurance J. (2004). ""I Wonder What the King is Doing Tonight" Looking for Arthur in All the Wrong Places". Proceedings of the Harvard Celtic Colloquium. 24/25: 54–72. JSTOR 40285181.
- McCone, Kim (1984). "Clones and Her Neighbours in the Early Period: Hints from Some Airgialla Saints' Lives". Clogher Record. 11 (3). Clogher Historical Society: 305–325. doi:10.2307/27695892. JSTOR 27695892.
