= Tommaltach mac Indrechtaig =

Historical Irish king (died 790)

Tommaltach mac Indrechtaig (died 790) was a King of Dal nAraide in Ulaid (Ulster) and possible King of all Ulaid. He was the son of Indrechtach mac Lethlobair (died 741), a previous King of Dal nAraide. He ruled from 776 to 790 and as King of all Ulaid from 789 to 790. He belonged to the main ruling dynasty of the Dal nAraide known as the Uí Chóelbad based in Mag Line, east of Antrim town in modern county Antrim.

Tommaltach made his bid for the Dal nAraide throne in 776 supported by Eochaid mac Fiachnai (died 810) of the Dal Fiatach, son of the reigning King of Ulaid. They were successful at the Battle of Drong. They were successful and the incumbent king Cináed Ciarrge mac Cathussaig and his ally, Dúngal king of the Uí Tuirtri (an Airgialla tribe west of Lough Neagh), were slain. In 783 Tommaltach had to defend his position and won the Battle of Duma Achad (Dunaughey, modern County Antrim) against his internal enemies.

Upon the death of Fiachnae mac Áedo Róin (died 789), King of Ulaid, the Dal Fiatach became involved in a civil feud and Tommaltach made himself King of Ulaid. Tommaltach however died the next year. That same year in 790, a slaughter of the Dal Fiatach by the Dál nAraidi occurred. This is listed after his death notice for that year in the annals but yearly events are not necessarily listed in chronological order. Though listed as king of Ulaid in the kinglists in the Book of Leinster he is only awarded the title King of Dal nAraide at his death notice in the Annals of Ulster.

His grandson Lethlobar mac Loingsig (died 873) was also a King of Ulaid.
