= Áed Aired =

Áed Aired (died 698) or Áed Airdd or Áed Airech was a Dal nAraide king of the Cruithne in Ulaid (Ulster). He ruled from 690-698.

In the 6th and 7th centuries the Dal nAraide were part of a confederation of Cruithne tribes in Ulaid (Ulster) and were the dominant members. He was a member of the Uí Dercu Chéin sept which resided in the Lagan river valley on the borders of modern County Down and Antrim. The annals call him King of Dal nAraide at his death obit whereas the normal title used during this time was King of the Cruithne.

The annals record his death at the Battle of Telach Garraisc in Fernmag (Farney, County Monaghan) along with Conchobar Macha mac Máele Dúin, King of the Airthir (an Airgialla tribe of modern County Armagh) in 698. One explanation of the battle is that they were allies fighting against the Uí Cremthainn (another Airgialla tribe of eastern County Fermanagh and northern County Monaghan) Another is that Conchobar was his enemy and they slew each other in battle. The motivation may have been to protect the ecclesiastical independence of Armagh from the Cenél nEógan
