= Cú Chuarán mac Dúngail Eilni =

Cú Chuarán mac Dúngaile (died 708) was a Dál nAraidi king of Ulaid, an over-kingdom in medieval Ireland. He was the son of Dúngal Eilni mac Scandail (died 681) and brother of Ailill mac Dúngaile Eilni (died 690), previous kings of Dál nAraidi

In the 6th and 7th centuries the Dál nAraidi were part of a confederation of Cruthin tribes in Ulaid and were the dominant members. Cú Chuarán belonged to a branch of this family settled in Eilne, a plain between the Bann and Bush rivers in modern-day County Antrim, Northern Ireland. This plain had been conquered by the Dál nAraidi by the middle of the seventh century.

He would have become king of Dál nAraidi on death of Áed Aired (died 698) ruling from 698 to 708 and king of Ulaid upon abdication of Bécc Bairrche mac Blathmaic in 707 of the Dál Fiatach ruling from 707 to 708. The Annals of Ulster call him king of the Cruthin. The king lists and other annals though also give him the title king of Ulaid.

Cú Chuarán led an attack on the Irish lands of Dál Riata in northeast County Antrim. The Irish lands of Dál Riata were under attack by the Dál nAraidi since the battle of Magh Rath. He was killed by Scanlán Finn húa Rebáin a member of the Dál nAraidi and the kingship reverted to the Dál Fiatach.
