= Fiachra Cáech =

Fiachra Cáech (died 608) was the founder of a branch of the Uí Chóelbad dynasty of Dál nAraidi that would ruled the petty-kingdom of Eilne, in Ulaid, medieval Ireland. Fiachra was the brother of Fiachnae Lurgan, king of Dál nAraidi and over-king of Ulaid. This offshoot of the Uí Chóelbad based in Eilne became known as the Dál nAraidi in Tuiascirt.
