= Flathróe mac Fiachrach =

Flathróe mac Fiachrach (died 774) was a Dál nAraidi king of the Cruthin in Ulaid, a medieval over-kingdom in Ireland. He was the son of Fiachra Cossalach (died 710), a previous king. He may have belonged to the Eilne branch of the family. He ruled from 749-774.

Nothing is recorded of his reign in the annals but his death notice is significant in that it was the last time the title king of the Cruthin was used for the kings of Dál nAraidi.

Flathróe mac Fiachrach's genealogy is recorded in Leabhar na nGenealach as; "Oilill s. Cumascach s. Flannagán s. Eochaid s. Breasal s. Flaithrí s. Fiachra Cos-salach s. Dúnghalach s. Scannal s. Béice s. Fiachra Crach, who is Teallán s. Baodán s. Eochaidh.".
