= Cináed Ciarrge mac Cathussaig =

Cináed Ciarrge mac Cathussaig (died 776) was a Dál nAraidi king of Ulaid, an over-kingdom in medieval Ireland. He was the son of Cathussach mac Ailello (died 749), a previous king and possible over-king of Ulaid. He belonged to the Eilne branch of the family, and ruled from 774 to 776.

The Dál nAraidi became involved in civil war during his reign and in 776 they fought a battle amongst themselves at the battle of Sliabh Mis (Slemish mountain). That same year they engaged in another battle, the battle of Drong, where the opposing sides sought the assistance of their neighbours. Cináed and his ally, Dúngal king of the Uí Tuirtri, were slain by Tommaltach mac Indrechtaig (died 790) and his ally Eochaid mac Fiachnai (died 810) of the Dál Fiatach.
