= Knock Iveagh =

Archaeological site in County Down, Northern Ireland

Coordinates: 54°16′31″N 6°11′07″W

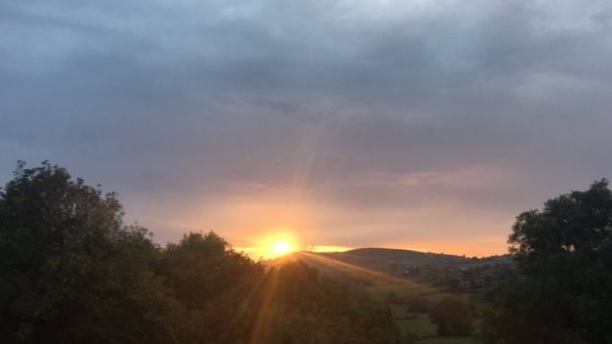
A view of Knock Iveagh

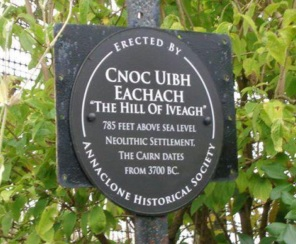
"The Hill of Iveagh" -- Annaclone Historical Society Sign

Knock Iveagh (from Irish Cnoc Uíbh Eachach 'hill of Iveagh') is a hill near Rathfriland, County Down, Northern Ireland. It is topped by an ancient burial cairn and was part of a ritual landscape, associated with the Uí Eachach tribe. In the Middle Ages it was the inauguration site of the Magennis chiefs of Iveagh.

== Knock Iveagh Cairn - 'Eochaidh's Cairn' ==
On the summit is an ancient burial cairn, made up of a small chamber which was covered by a mound of stone and earth. The cairn is thought to date from around 4000BC. It is one of 1,900 scheduled monuments protected by law, specifically the Historic Monuments and Archaeological Objects (NI) Order 1995, which makes it an offence to carry out changes to the site without consent.

== Historical importance ==
The hill is named after the former Gaelic territory of Iveagh (Uíbh Eachach, 'descdendants of Echu'). It was the ancestral seat of the Magennis (Mag Aonghusa) chiefs of Iveagh and later the Viscounts of Iveagh. The kings and chiefs of Iveagh were believed to have been inaugurated on its summit.

The hill is part of a ritual landscape, including other sites of importance to the Magennises. These include:

- A late Medieval church used by the Magennises, the location of which is listed as ‘unknown’ but which was recorded by local historians from Annaclone Historical Society in 2010.
- The Magennis castle in Rathfriland.
- A previously unidentified stone which is thought may have been used to inaugurate the Magennis chiefs.

Gavin Hughes of the Centre for Medieval and Renaissance Studies, Trinity College Dublin, has said of the hill and its place within the wider ritual landscape: "Knock Iveagh appears to be a dominating feature in an exciting amphitheatre of multi-period archaeology which deserves proper and further detailed research. Indeed, such a complex historical continuity in the landscape is very rare – and this could be unique."

== Archaeological work and interest ==
There is thought to have been little archaeological excavation or surveying work carried out on the hill, save for the work Pat Collins of the Northern Ireland Archaeological Survey in 1957. Eamonn Kelly, former Keeper of Antiquities at the National Museum of Ireland, called for further surveying to be carried out before any potential development near the hill, "given the strong probability that there is additional and possible extensive archaeology present relating to the ritual use of the hill".

Knock Iveagh featured on Joe Mahon's Lesser Spotted Ulster series (Annaclone episode) on UTV in 2014.

Preliminary archaeological work carried out in 2018 has suggested that there may be a link between the hill and Saint Patrick.

== Wind turbine controversy ==
A wind turbine, access road and substation were built on Knock Iveagh in 2017. A local group, Friends of Knock Iveagh, has campaigned for its removal due to the historical and cultural importance of the site. Building permission was granted by the former Department of the Environment. However, heritage experts were not consulted as they should have been. In 2020, the district council agreed that the turbine was having an adverse environmental and visual impact on the monument and landscape. Councillors voted to ask the Department for Infrastructure to remove the turbine.
