= Condlae mac Cóelbad =

Condlae mac Cóelbad (flourished later 5th century) was a Dal nAraide King, at the time of Saint Patrick. He was the son of Cáelbad mac Cruind Ba Druí, a high king of Ireland and King of Ulster, and brother of the previous Dal nAraide King Sárán mac Cóelbad.

His exact dates are unknown, as he is only listed in King lists and not in the Irish annals. The Vita tripartita Sancti Patricii preserves the story that he received Patrick with humility, and granted him Domnach Combair (Muckamore, County Antrim) for a Church. As a result, Patrick gave him and his descendants blessing over those of Sárán who had violently opposed him.

Condlae's descendants the Uí Chóelbad would eventually dominate the kingship. His son Eochaid mac Condlai (died 553) was king of all Ulaid.
