= Sárán mac Cóelbad =

Sárán mac Cóelbad (flourished circa third quarter of 5th century) was a Dal nAraide king in the time of Saint Patrick. He was the son of Cáelbad mac Cruind Ba Druí, a high king of Ireland and King of Ulster. He is listed in king lists such as in the Book of Leinster and Laud Synchronisms but is not mentioned in the Irish annals. Genealogies such as Laud Genealogies and Rawlinson Genealogies give him a reign of 26 years. Another mention of Sárán is in the Vita tripartita Sancti Patricii. According to this, Sárán had made a raid on the Irish portion of Dál Riata and took away some captives. According to the Keating Genealogies, the Mac Artáin of Kinelarty, County Down descend from him.

== Early life and kingship ==
Sárán mac Cóelbad was second son of Cáelbad and was King of Ulster for 26 years before he was ousted (c. 357) by the three brothers known as the Three Collas. According to folklore, the Three Collas conquered Ulster, burnt and destroyed Eamhain Mhacha, and transplanted the natives to Dál nAraidi and Iveagh.

Sárán mac Cóelbad, as the last king of Ulster of the Irian line, was removed to the Barony of Iveagh, where he became a Cruithin political figure and patriarch of the MacAonghusa (McGuinness) family.

== Chief of the Dal Airaidhe ==
Sárán was chief of the Dál nAraidi during the time of Saint Patrick. He was seemingly known as a blood thirsty warrior who killed and enslaved many people and criticised Saint Patrick. Olcán, an Irish saint with a monastery at Armoy, reputedly agreed to baptise Sárán to save lives. This infuriated Saint Patrick, who prophesied that Olcan's monastery would be destroyed three times. Accordingly, some of the Irish historical annals record that Olcan's monastery was raided by a king of Dál Riata, later by Cucuaran, and finally by Eochaid, who destroyed all but the stump of its round tower.
