= Cairell mac Fiachnai =

Cairell mac Fiachnai (died 819) was a Dal Fiatach king of Ulaid, which is now Ulster, Ireland. He was the son of Fiachnae mac Áedo Róin (died 789), a previous king. He ruled from 810 to 819.

In 809 Cairell challenged his brother Eochaid mac Fiachnai for the throne and defeated him in battle. This challenge had occurred after the high king Áed Oirdnide campaigned against Ulaid and ravaged from the Bann to Strangford Lough. According to the annals Eochaid escaped from the battle and historians assign 810 as his death date. Cairell became King of Ulaid as a result. In 819 Muiredach mac Eochada (died 839) obtained revenge for his father by defeating and slaying Cairell in a skirmish in 819.

Viking raids had begun on Ireland (an island off the north Ulaid coast had been attacked in 795) and in 811 the annals record the slaughtering of a group of them by the Ulaid.

Cairell's descendants did not hold the kingship of Ulaid which instead descended through his brother Eochaid. However, his descendants were prominent at the royal monastic center at Downpatrick.
