= Dúngal Eilni mac Scandail =

Dúngal Eilni mac Scandail (died 681) was a Dál nAraidi king of the Cruthin. He ascended to this position some time after 668. He was the son of Scandal mac Bécce (died 646), a previous king.

In the 6th and 7th centuries the Dál nAraidi were part of a confederation of Cruthin tribes in Ulaid, an over-kingdom in Ireland, and were the dominant dynasty. Dungal belonged to a branch of this family settled in Eilne, a plain between the Bann and Bush rivers in modern-day County Antrim, Northern Ireland. He is styled "King of the Cruithne" in the annals.

In 681 he and Cenn Fáelad mac Suibne, chief of Cianachta Glenn Geimin were defeated by Máel Dúin mac Máele Fithrich (died 681) of the Cenél nEógan at what was called the burning of the kings at Dún Ceithirn (in barony of Coleraine, in modern County Londonderry).

His sons Ailill mac Dúngaile Eilni (died 690) and Cú Chuarán mac Dúngail Eilni (died 708) would also become chiefs of the Dál nAraidi. Cú Chuarán was king of all Ulaid as well. Dúngal also had another son, Fiachra Cossalach (died 710), who was a Dál nAraidi king of the Cruthin, who ruled from 709-710.

== See also ==
- Kings of Dál nAraidi
