= Ernaine mac Fiachnai =

King of Ailech (d. 636)

Ernaine mac Fiachnai (died 636) was a King of Ailech and head of the Cenél nEógain branch of the northern Uí Néill. He was the brother of the high king of Ireland Suibne Menn (died 628). He ruled in Ailech from 630 to 636.

A rival branch of the Cenél nEógain called the Cenél maic Ercae had dominated the kingship of Ailech until the reign of his brother Suibne Menn (died 628) of the Cenél Feradaig branch. In 630 these two branches of the family clashed at the Battle of Leitheirbe and Ernaine was victorious over Máel Fithrich mac Áedo, who was slain, of the Cenél maic Ercae. The Cenél Feradaig branch then dominated the kingship for most of the 7th century. Ernaine was killed in 636 but his killer is not named. According to the Laud Synchronisms he was killed by the Cenél nEógain, probably the Cenél maic Ercae.
