= Cáelbad =

Legendary High King of Ireland

Cáelbad (Cáelbhadh, Caolbhadh, Caolbhaidh), son of Cronn Badhraoi, a descendant of Mal mac Rochride, was, according to Lebor Gabála Érenn, a High King of Ireland for a period of one year. Inneacht daughter of Lughaidh was the mother of Caolbhaidh son of Cronn Badhraoi; and he was slain by Eochaid Mugmedon. The chronology of Geoffrey Keating's Foras Feasa ar Éirinn dates his reign to 343–344, that of the Annals of the Four Masters to 356–357.

== Genealogy ==
According to Foras Feasa ar Éirinn, Caolbhaidh was a son of Cronn Badhraoi, son of Eochaidh Cobha, son of Lughaidh, son of Rossa, son of Iomchaidh, son of Feidhlimidh, son of Cas, son of Fiachaidh Aruidhe, son of Aonghus Gaibhnionn, son of Fearghus Foghlas, son of Tiobraide Tireach, son of Breasal, son of Fearb, son of Mal, son of Rochruidhe, son of Cathbhadh, son of Giallchaidh, son of Cunnchaidh, son of Fionnchaidh, son of Muireadhach, son of Fiachaidh Fionnamhnus, son of Irial Glunmhar, son of Conall Cearnach of the race of Ir son of Milidh. Furthermore, John O'Hart's Irish Genealogies gives the line of descent onwards from Caolbhaidh descendant is his son:-

- 92.Feargan: his son
- 93.Mongan: his son
- 94.Fogartach: his son
- 95.Cruinnieth: his son
- 96.Artan: his son
- 97.Cuinncon: his son
- 98.Crum na Cruach: his son
- 99.Croncruach: his son
- 100.Eochaidh: his son
- 101.Searran: his son
- 102.Bugmaille: his son
- 103.Ciannait: his son
- 104.Gillcolum: his son
- 105.Donall: his son
- 106.Fionnach/Donoch: his son
- 107.Shane/John: his son
- 108.Tomhas: his son
- 109.Tomhas Oge: his son
- 110.Searran II: his son
- 111.GiollaPadraic: his son
- 112.GiollaPadraic Oge: his son
- 113.Giolgagin: his son
- 114.GiollaCollum: his son
- 115.Eachmilidh I: his son
- 116.Aodh/Hugh: his son
- 117.Torlogh: his son
- 118.Phelim: his son
- 119.Eachmilidh II: his son
- 120.Phelim II: his son
- 121.Patrick McCartan: his son
- 122.John McCartan:(Left Ireland in the service of King James II) his son
- 123.Anthony McCartan: (Followed King James II and became a Captain in the French Brigade in France) his son
- 124.Antoine McCartan: (A Physician) his son
- 125.Andronicus McCartan: (A Medical Doctor) his son
- 126.Felix McCartan of Lille.

== Legends ==
The Macalister translation of Lebor Gabála Érenn says that Cáelbad was also King of Ulster when he killed Muiredach Tirech to take the Kingship. It also says that he took the kingship of Ireland for a space of one year, and exacted the Boroma, a cattle tax, without a battle. And he fell at the hands of Eochaid Mugmedon. Cáelbad also had a son, Fíachna Lonn mac Cóelbad, who was a King of the Dál nAraidi.

The Annals of the Four Masters, annal M356.1 says that after Muireadhach Tireach had been thirty years in the sovereignty of Ireland, he was slain by Caelbhadh, son of Crunn, King of Uladh, at Portrigh, over Dabhall. It goes on further to say in annal M357.1 that after Caelbhadh, son of Crunn Badhrai, had been one year in the sovereignty of Ireland, he was slain by Eochaidh Muighmheadhoin.

Preceded by Muiredach Tirech	High King of Ireland; AFM 356–357; FFE 343–344	Succeeded by Eochaid Mugmedon

== See also ==
- Saran mac Cáelbad
