= Máel Dúin mac Máele Fithrich =

Irish king, 7th century

Máel Dúin mac Máele Fithrich (died 681) was a King of Ailech and head of the Cenél nEógain branch of the northern Uí Néill. He had married Cacht ingen Cellaig, daughter of the high king Cellach mac Máele Coba (died 658) of the Cenél Conaill and their son Fergal mac Máele Dúin (died 722) was high king of Ireland.

He was the son of Máel Fithrich mac Áedo (died 630) and grandson of the high king Áed Uaridnach (died 612). He ruled as King of Ailech from circa 668-681. The annals record the destruction of Ailech in 676 by the high king Fínsnechta Fledach (died 695) of the southern Uí Néill who appears to have asserted his authority in the north.

Máel Dúin was active increasing the power of the Cenél nEógain. In 677 he slew Dúnchad son of Ultán, king of Airgialla -of the Uí mac Carthainn, near Lough Foyle, Tirkeeran in modern County Londonderry- in Dún Forgo. In the summer of 681 he was successful over Dúngal Eilni mac Scandail of Dal nAraide and Cenn Faelad mac Suibni of the Cianachta Glenn Geimin (Keenaght, County Londonderry) at what was called the burning of the kings at Dún Ceithirn (in barony of Coleraine, in modern County Londonderry).

He belonged to the Cenél maic Ercae branch of the family. The rival Cenél Feradaig branch dominated the kingship for most of the 7th century. At the beginning of winter 681 he was defeated and slain at the Battle of Bla Sléibe (in modern County Londonderry) by the Ciannachta of Glenn Geimin and by Fland mac Máele Tuile (died 700) of the rival Cenél Feradaig.

Máel Dúin mac Máele Fithrich is recorded as the ancestor of the Ó Dálaigh bardic family in the O'Clery Book of Genealogies.

== Notes ==
Preceded by Ferg mac Crundmaíl	King of Ailech; 668–681	Succeeded by Fland mac Máele Tuile
