= Keenaght (barony) =

Barony in County Londonderry, Northern Ireland

Keenaght Cianachta (Irish)
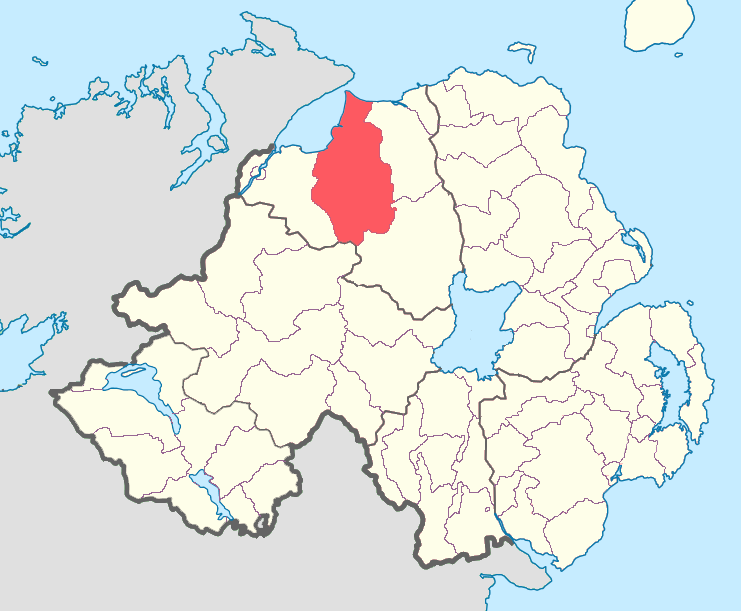
- Location of Keenaght, County Londonderry, Northern Ireland.
- Sovereign state: United Kingdom
- Country: Northern Ireland
- County: Londonderry

Keenaght (from Irish Cianachta 'race of Cian') is a barony in the mid-northerly third of County Londonderry, Northern Ireland. It connects to the north-Londonderry coastline, and is bordered by four other baronies: Coleraine to the east; Loughinsholin to the south-east; Tirkeeran to the west; and Strabane Upper to the south-west. It was the territory of the Cianachta Glengiven from the 5th century until its takeover in the 12th century by the Ó Cathaín's. The largest settlement in the barony is the town of Limavady.

== History ==
Originally called the barony of Lymavady prior to 1613, the barony of Keenaght gets its name from an anglicisation of the Irish Ciannachta, which is derived from Cianachta Glenn Geimin (race of Cian of Glengiven), also spelt as Ciannachta Glenn Geimin and Ciannachta Glinne Geimin. The principle sept of the Cianachta Glenn Geimin was the Ó Conchobhair (Connor Clan), who ruled there from the 5th century until they were succeeded by the Ó Catháin (Kane/Keane) in the 12th century.

In 681, Cenn Fáelad, king of Cianachta Glenn Geimin, along with Dungal Eilni, king of the Cruthin and Dál nAraidi, were killed at Dún Cethirinn by Máel Dúin mac Máele Fithrich of the Cenél Meic Ercae of Cenél nEógain.

Some form of combination of the Cianachta Glenn Geimin along with the Cenél Feradaig and Dál nAraidi was suspected of involvement in the death of Eochaid mac Domangairt, king of the Cenél nGabráin of Scottish Dál Riata in 697. This act was carried out by Fiannamail ua Dúnchado who would later become king of Dál Riata, however in 700, he along with Flann mac Cinn-faelad of the Cianachta Glinne Geimin were slain in turn.

After its fall to the Ó Catháin, Keenaght became the homeland to their followers, the Ó Maoláin (Mullan). and the Mac Giollagain (MacGilligan). By the early 17th century, the latter controlled what was called "MacGilligans country" along the north coast, which has been preserved in the form of the present-day parish of Magilligan and the Magilligan peninsula.

An Ó Coinne (O'Quinn) is later noted in Annals of the Four Masters in 1218 as being chief of Moy Lugad, which according to the Books of Lecan and Ballymote, lay in Keenaght.

=== References in the Annals ===
Keenaght is mentioned in the Annals under a variety of spellings of Cianachta Glenn Geimin. U stands for Annals of Ulster, M for Annals of the Four Masters, A stands for unspecified annals.

- M563, After Eochaidh and Baedan had been two years in the sovereignty of Ireland, they were slain by Cronan, chief of Cianachta Glinne Gemhin.
- U572, The slaying of two descendants of Muiredach i.e. Baetán son of Muirchertach and Echaid son of Domnall son of Muirchertach Mac Erca, in the third year of their reign. Crónán son of Tigernach, king of the Ciannachta of Glenn Geimin, was their slayer.
- U616, Death of Suibne son of Crechéne, king of Ciannachta Glinne Geimin
- CS681, Cenn Faelad son of Suibne, king of the Ciannachta of Glenn Geimin, died.
- CS681, Mael Dúin son of Mael Fithrich was slain by the Ciannachta of Glenn Geimin and by Flann Finn son of Mael Tuile.
- A700, Flann mac Cinn-faelad of the Ciannachta Glinne Geimin was slain along with Fiannamail ua Dúnchado, king of Dál Riata.
- U702, Ailill son of Cenn Faelad, king of Ciannachta, died.
- M752, Tomaltach, Lord of Cianachta Glinne Geimhin, died.
- M755, Conchobhar grandson of Tadhg Teimhin, Lord of Ciannachta Glinne Geimhin, died.
- U757, Fergus son of Congal, Tomaltach, king of Ciannachta Glinne Gaimin, the anchorite Cuidgal, Aildobur, abbot of Muiccert, died.
- M881, Donnchuan, son of Conghalach, lord of Cianachta Glinne Geimhin, died.
- M925, Goach, son of Dubhroa, lord of Cianachta-Glinne-Geimhin, was slain by Muircheartach, son of Niall.
- U1015, Donnchad ua Goaigh, king of Ciannachta, was killed by the Cenél Eógain.
- M1022, Domhnall, grandson of Murchadh Glunillar, lord of the North, was slain by the Cianachta of Gleann-Geimhin.
- M1023, Lochlainn, son of Maeleachlainn, lord of Inis-Eoghain and Magh-Itha, was slain by his own brother, Niall, and the Cianachta of Gleann-Geimhin.
- LC1094, Conchobhar O'Conchobhair, king of Cianachta, in poenitentia mortuus est.
- M1095, Ua Conchobhair, lord of Cianachta-Glinne-Geimhin, was slain.
- M1096, Conchobhar Ua hAinniarraidh, lord of Cianachta, and Ua Cein, lord of Ui-Mic-Cairthinn, fell by each other in a combat.
- LC1100, Echri Ua Maelmuire, king of Cianachta, was slain by Ua Conchobhair of Cianachta-Glinne -Geimhin.
- LC1104, Donnchadh Ua Conchobhair, King of Cianachta, was slain by his own people.
- M1121, Gilla-Easbuig Eoghain Ua hAinniarraidh, lord of Cianachta-Glinne-Geimhin, was killed by his brothers.
- U1197, A hosting by John De-Courcy with the Foreigners of Ulidia to Ess-craibhe, so that they built the castle of Cell-Santain [and] the cantred of Ciannachta was desolated by them.
- U1197, Mac Gilla-Eidich of the Ciannachta robbed the great altar of the great church of Daire of Columcille and took the four [five] best goblets that were in Ireland therefrom, including 'the gray son' and 'the son of light' and the goblet of Ua Maeldoraidh and 'the twisted goblet' and the goblet of Ua Dochartaich... And he was hanged (namely, at the Cross of the Executions) in reparation to Colum-cille, whose altar was profaned there.
- U1207, A hosting by Hugo De Lacy into Ciannachta, so that he burned the churches of all Ciannachta and seized cows to a countless number.

== List of major settlements ==
- Ballykelly
- Dungiven
- Limavady

== List of civil parishes ==
Below is a list of civil parishes in Keenaght:

- Aghanloo
- Balteagh
- Banagher (split with barony of Tirkeeran)
- Bovevagh
- Carrick
- Drumachose
- Dungiven
- Magilligan (also known as Tamlaghtard)
- Tamlaght Finlagan

== Bibliography ==
- Bell, Robert (2003). The book of Ulster surnames. The Black Staff Press. ISBN 0-85640-602-3.
- Charles Edwards, T.M. (2006). The Chronicle of Ireland, Volume 1. Liverpool University Press. ISBN 9780853239598.
- Cosgrove, Art, ed. (2008). A New History of Ireland, II Medieval Ireland 1169-1534. Oxford University Press. ISBN 978-019-953970-3.
- Maney, Laurance (2002). "Erratum for Volume 20/21 of the "Proceedings of the Harvard Celtic Colloquium"". Proceedings of the Harvard Celtic Colloquium. 22. Department of Celtic Languages & Literatures, Harvard University: 264–269.
- Maney, Laurance (2004–2005). ""I Wonder What the King Is Doing Tonight" Looking for Arthur in All the Wrong Places". Proceedings of the Harvard Celtic Colloquium. 24/25. Department of Celtic Languages & Literatures, Harvard University: 54–72.
