= Cathussach mac Ailello =

Cathussach mac Ailello (died 749) was a Dál nAraidi king of Ulaid, in medieval Ireland. He was the son of Ailill mac Dúngaile Eilni (died 690), a previous king of Dál nAraidi and nephew of Cú Chuarán mac Dúngail Eilni (died 708), a previous king of Ulaid. He ruled from 735-749. He belonged to a branch of this family that settled in Eilne, a strip of territory located between the Bann and Bush rivers in modern County Antrim, Northern Ireland.

It is uncertain at what date he acquired the kingship of Dál nAraidi. The death of Dub dá Inber mac Congalaig as king of the Cruthin (the title used for them at this time in the annals) is recorded in 727. Indrechtach mac Lethlobair (died 741) is also listed before Cathussach in the king lists but it is possible he resigned the kingship to Indrechtach upon becoming King of Ulaid in 735.

Cathussach was killed at Ráith Beithech (Rathveagh, modern County Antrim) probably in the interest of the rival Dál Fiatach who retook the kingship of Ulaid.

Neither the Annals of Tigernach nor the Annals of Ulster give him the title king of Ulaid at his death notice but instead refer to him as King of the Cruthin. Professor Byrne believes that there may have been an interregnum in Ulaid between 735-750. This would give a possible reign for Cathussach over the Dál nAraidi from 741-749 if this were true and would explain his placing in the king lists of the Cruthin.

His son Cináed Ciarrge mac Cathussaig (died 776) was also king of Dál nAraidi.
