= Iveagh =

Ancient territory in Ireland

Iveagh Uíbh Eachach (Irish)
- 4th century–1543
- Coat of arms

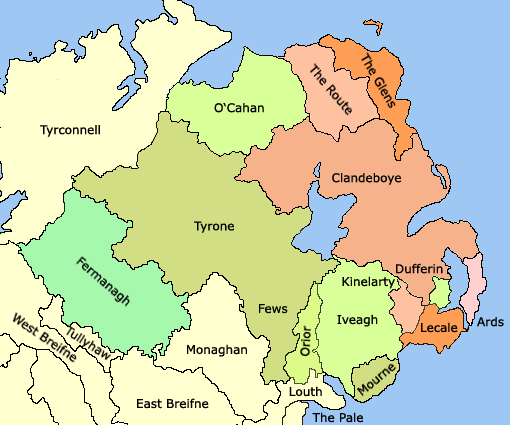
- Iveagh in the 15th–16th centuries
- Status: Túatha of Ulster (until 1177)
- Common languages: Irish
- Government: Elective monarchy
- King / Chief
  - died 552: Fothad mac Conaille (first)
  - 1543: Art MacArtáin (last)
- History
  - Established: 4th century
  - Disestablished: 1543
| Preceded by | Succeeded by |
| Ulster | Kingdom of Ireland |
- Today part of: United Kingdom of Great Britain and Northern Ireland

Iveagh (/ˈaɪveɪ/ EYE-vay; from Irish Uíbh Eachach, meaning 'descendants of Echu') is the name of several historical territorial divisions in what is now County Down, Northern Ireland. Originally it was a Gaelic Irish territory, ruled by the Uí Echach Cobo and part of the overkingdom of Ulaid. From the 12th century the Magennises (Mac Aonghusa) were chiefs of Iveagh. They were based at Rathfriland and were inaugurated at Knock Iveagh. Following the Nine Years' War, the rulers of Iveagh submitted to the English Crown and the territory was divided between them. Iveagh became a barony, which was later split into Iveagh Lower and Iveagh Upper. The territory of Iveagh was also the basis of the Roman Catholic Diocese of Dromore.

== Uí Echach Cobo ==
Iveagh derives its name from the Cruithin tribe Uí Echach (modern Irish: Uíbh Eachach), or "descendants of Echu", and referred to an ancient Irish túath (district). It is also known more fully as Uí Echach Cobo (modern Irish: Uíbh Eachach Cobha, meaning Echu of Cobo), and equivalent with Uí Echach Uladh (Echu of Ulster). The Uí Echach were one of the tribes that made up the ancient kingdom of Ulaid in eastern Ulster. They shared the kingship of Ulaid with the Dál Fiatach and their kin the Dál nAraidi. The Uí Echach were the most prominent sept of the Cruthin.

The name Magh Cobha, meaning "plain of Cobo", appears to have been an older name for Iveagh. The name survived as Moycove, the earliest recorded name in the civil parish of Drumballyroney, where it was the name of an Anglo-Norman castle between 1188–1261. The highest point in the parish is the hills of Knock Iveagh (Cnoc Uí Echach), which may have been the centre of Uí Echach power.

Another form of the name appears to have been Cuib, with the title of "king" of Cuib/Cobo making its first appearance in the Annals of Tigernach under the year 685AD, and in the Annals of Ulster under 735AD. The last mention is in the Annals of Ulster under the year 882AD, after which the term is replaced with chief/lord of Uí Echach.

Uí Echach Cobo is mentioned in the Irish annals from AD551 to AD1136, with the last entry stating that "Echri Ua-h-Aitteidh, Lord of Ui-Eathach, was killed by the Ui-Eathach themselves".

=== Echach Cobo ===
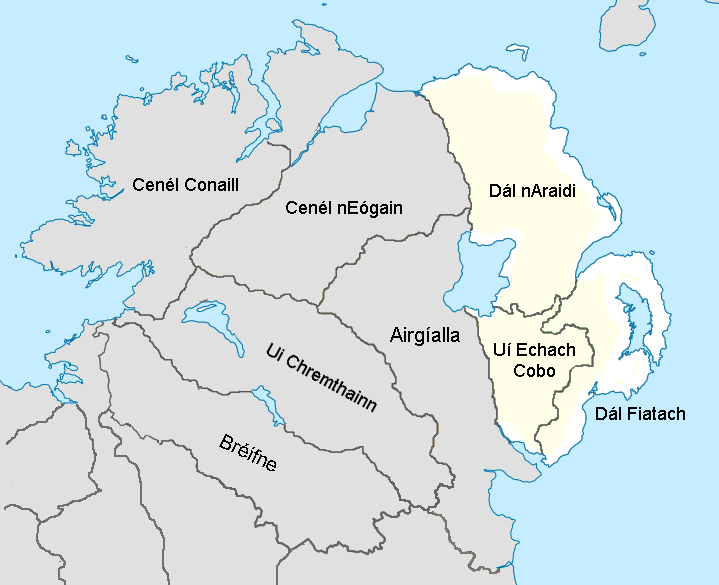
Ulaid during the 12th century and its three main sub-kingdoms, including Uí Echach Cobo, along with some of its neighbouring kingdoms.

The ancestor of the Uí Echach Cobo, Eochaid mac Condlai, descends from Fiachu Araide, eponymous founder of Dál nAraidi. The exact line of descent is uncertain as several different genealogies are given:

The Annals of Ulster give:

- 553AD, Eochu, ancestor of the "Ui Echach Ulad", is listed as the son of the king of Ulaid, Conlaed.

Rawlinson's Genealogies gives:

- The Genelach Dál Araide section: Echdach, son of Condlae, son of Cóelbad, son of Cruind Ba Druí.
- The Genelach Úa n-Echach and Genelach Úa n-Echach Coba sections give: the Uíbh Eachach Cobha are listed as following from Eocho/Echach Coba, son of Cruind Ba Druí.
- The Genelach Mheg Aenghusu Indso section, which refers to the Mac Aenghusa sept of the Uíbh Eachach Cobo: Echach, son of Condlai, son of Cóelbad Coba, son of Cruind ba Drái, son of Echach Coba (of the Uibh Echach), son of Lugdhach.

The Laud Genealogies and Tribal Histories gives:

- The Síl Fergusa section: Echach, son of Condlai, son of Cóelbad Coba, son of Cruind ba Drái, son of Echach Coba, son of Lugdhach.
- De genelach hÚa nEchach Coba section: Echach, son of Cruind ba drui, is given as the progenitor of the "hÍ Echach", however also mentions an Echach Coba, son of Aililla, son of Fedlimthe.

=== Kings of Cuib ===
- Fothad mac Conaille (died 552)
- ...
- Áedán m. Mongáin (died 616)
- Fergus mac Áedáin (d.692) – King of Ulster from 674
- Bressal mac Fergusa (died 685)
- Eochaid mac Bressail (died 733)
- Conchad mac Cúanach (died 735)
- Fergus Glut (died 739)
- Ailill mac Feidlimid (died 761)
- Gormgal mac Conaille (died 776)
- Eochu mac Aililla (died 801)
- Máel Bressail mac Ailillo (died 825) – King of Ulster from 819
- Cernach mac Máele Bressail (died 853)
- Conallán mac Máele Dúin (died 882)
- Aitith mac Laigni (died 898) – King of Ulster from 896

== Chiefs and lords of Iveagh ==
At one point the territory of Iveagh was ruled by the Ua hAitidhe, a name which may have been anglicised as O'Haughey or Haughey. The Ua hAitidhe are claimed to have ruled Iveagh for two centuries. The first to be mentioned in the annals is Aodh Ua hAitidhe, king of Uí Echach Cobo, who was killed by his own people in AD965. The last mention is under AD1136 where Echri Ua hAitidhe, lord of Uí Echach Cobo was killed, likewise by his own people. From then on the name and its variant spellings disappear from the records.

One of the septs under the Ui hAitidhe was the Mac Aonghusa (Magennis/MacGuiness), who ruled Clann Aodha (Clan Hugh), and were descended from Sárán, a descendant of Echach Cobo. By the 12th century the Magennises had become the chiefs of Iveagh, with Rathfriland their base. One early mention is in 1153 with the granting of the charter to the abbey of Newry which was witnessed by Aedh Mor Magennis, chief of Clann Aodha, of Iveagh. The Mac Aonghusa are also mentioned in letters by King Edward II, where they are titled Dux Hibernicorum de Ouehagh, meaning "chief of the Irish of Iveagh".

During the 14th century the Mac Artáin (MacCartan) chiefs of the name of Kinelarty became chiefs of Iveagh, though in the annals a Muirchertach MacArtain is recorded as tánaiste (heir-elect) of Iveagh in the 11th century. The MacCartan descended from Artáin, a great-grandson of Mongán Mac Aonghusa.

By the 15th century with the collapse of the Earldom of Ulster, the Mac Aonghusa had expanded Iveagh from what is now County Down all the way east to Dundrum Castle, where County Down meets the Irish Sea. Iveagh however was far from secure as rivalry between the four main branches of the Mac Aonghusa clan—Castlewellan, Corgary, Kilwarlin, and Rathfriland—threatened its cohesion. In 1539 a cattle raid into County Meath was intercepted by Lord Deputy Grey and the clan was defeated at the Battle of Bellahoe. In 1543 the then chief Art MacArtáin of Rathfriland accepted the new policy of "Surrender and regrant" and travelled to Greenwich Palace to be knighted as Sir Arthur Guinez by King Henry VIII.

In 1575 Hugh Magennis of Rathfriland petitioned successfully for a grant of his estates from Queen Elizabeth and was knighted in 1576. In 1584 his tenure was improved by a grant in capite "of the entire country or territory of Iveagh". In 1585 his cousin Ever MacRory Magennis was granted the adjacent lordship and manor of Kilwarlin.

During the Nine Years' War (1594–1603), the clan chief Art Roe remained neutral, while many of his clan sided with Hugh O'Neill, Earl of Tyrone, one of whose wives was Catherine Magennis. O'Neill inaugurated a new chief in 1595 and the clan divided. Despite this, Charles Blount, the Lord Deputy of Ireland, ravaged Iveagh to the point that its chief Art Roe Magennis submitted to prevent the extermination of his people.

== The division of Iveagh ==
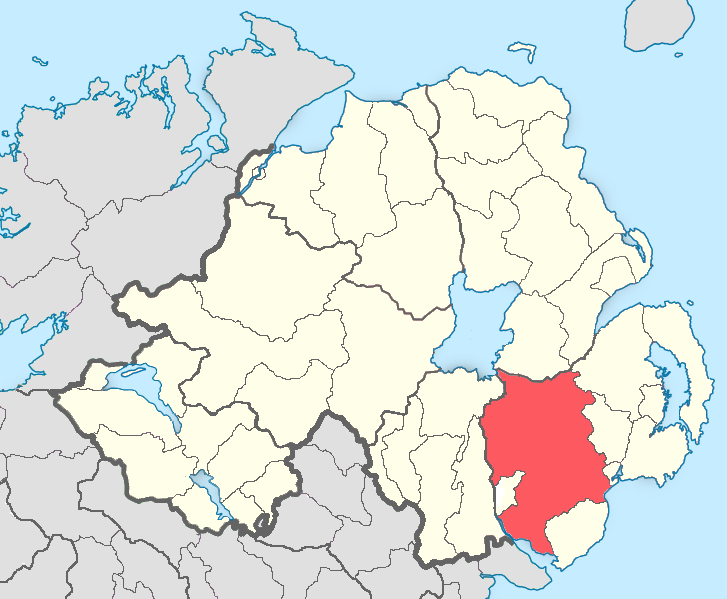
The former barony of Iveagh

Following the Nine Years' War and just before the process of colonising Ulster with loyal Protestant subjects, the arrangement of dividing mighty Gaelic lordships into smaller, weaker lordships, such as what happened in County Monaghan with the MacMahons, occurred with Iveagh. In 1605 the "Commission for the Division and Bounding of the Lords" was established to replicate the Monaghan arrangement. In February 1607, the commission decided to break up Iveagh, a process that continued until 1610, seeing the creation of fifteen freeholds. The Magennises of Iveagh were granted thirteen of these freeholds, with their chief Art Roe Magennis being granted the largest. The rest however was given to officers in the Crown forces, most of whom had served in the Nine Years' War under Sir Henry Bagenal and Sir Arthur Chichester.

== Barony of Iveagh ==
The Barony of Iveagh was created during the reign of Queen Elizabeth I out of the territory of Uíbh Eachach, and was the largest barony in County Down, reflecting the importance of the Irish district. In the early 17th century it was divided into Iveagh Lower and Iveagh Upper, with the boundary running east to west from the settlements of Dromara and Banbridge. By 1851 these two baronies were further divided into the baronies of Iveagh Lower, Lower Half, Iveagh Lower, Upper Half, Iveagh Upper, Lower Half and Iveagh Upper, Upper Half. The four baronies, like the rest of those in Northern Ireland, are now obsolete for administrative purposes.

== Other uses ==
The name Iveagh has been used as titles in the Peerage of Ireland and Peerage of the United Kingdom, specifically in regards to the Magennis and Guinness family:

- Viscount Magennis of Iveagh (1623–93)
- Baron Iveagh (created 1885)
- Viscount Iveagh (created 1905)
- Earl of Iveagh (created 1919)

In 1929 the Northern Ireland Parliament constituency of Iveagh was created, comprising the northern part of county down south-west of Belfast. Almost as if keeping with tradition, a descendant of the Mac Aonghusa, Brian Maginess, represented this constituency from 1938 until 1964. It was abolished in 1972 along with the Northern Ireland Parliament.

== Ecclesiastical counterpart ==
The medieval tuath was historically the territorial equivalent of the Diocese of Dromore.

== See also ==
- Baronies of Ireland
