= Trícha cét =

The tríocha céad, also known as trícha cét, meaning "thirty hundreds", was a unit of land-holding in eleventh and twelfth century Ireland. The term appears to relate to the number of troops an area could raise.

== Background ==
Described as a "spatial unit of royal tenure, taxation, local government, and military levy", the trícha cét largely corresponded to a local petty kingdom ruled by a petty king. A minority, however, were ruled by a taisaig (leader) or an airríg (governor), appointed by a superior kings.

In the province of Ulster, a tríocha céad was subdivided into roughly twenty-eight baile biadhtaigh, meaning "lands of a food-provider", and around 463 seisrigh, meaning "six-horse plough-teams".

During the eleventh century, the system became established across the island, a refinement on a pre-existing system.

== See also ==
- Townland
- Carucate
- Túath
