= Fíachnae mac Báetáin =

King of Ulster

Fíachnae mac Báetáin (died 626), also called Fíachnae Lurgan or Fíachnae Find, was king of the Dál nAraidi and High King of the Ulaid in the early 7th century. He was a son of Báetán mac Echdach and brother of Fiachra Cáech (died c. 608), grandson of the Ulaid king Eochaid mac Condlai (died 552) and father of Mongán mac Fiachnai.

== Life and kingship ==
The Dál nAraidi kingdom was in fact a number of competing Cruthin tribes at this time so succession to the kingship was achieved through force of arms and prestige rather than by any regular means. According to the genealogies, Fiachnae's predecessor was his great-uncle Áed Dub mac Suibni, who died c. 588, and Fíachnae became king some time after Áed Dub's death. The kingship of the Ulaid was contested by Dál nAraidi and Dál Fiatach kings, so Fíachnae again didn't succeed directly to the kingship but required some time to impose himself as high king after the death of his predecessor. There is reference in the Annals of the Four Masters dated 597 describing the Battle of Cuil Cael where he defeats the Dal Fiatach leader Fiachnae mac Demmáin and from this could date his true overlordship of Ulaid.

While no historical sources for Fíachnae's life now remain, excepting a few bald entries in the Irish annals, a number of later traditions and a lost poem called Sluagad Fiachnae meic Báetáin co Dún nGuaire i Saxanaib (The hosting of Fiachnae mac Báetáin to Dún Guaire (Bamburgh?) in the kingdom of the Saxons) suggest that he was a significant figure in his time, campaigning against Edwin of Northumbria and perhaps also against Edwin's predecessor Æthelfrith of Northumbria. He may have captured Bamburgh - or only besieged it - circa 623.

Literary sources claim that Fíachnae's mother, who is said to have come from the Dál Fiatach, conceived him as a means of revenge against her husband. Báetán did not like the child and once set a ferocious dog on him, which Fiachnae killed by spearing it through the heart with a meat-spit.

The 8th century saga Compert Mongáin, which recounts the deeds of a half legendary son Mongán mac Fiachnai, fathered on Fíachnnae's wife by the sea-god Manannán mac Lir, while Fiachnae campaigned alongside Áedán mac Gabráin of Dál Riata. Mongán was killed in c. 625, in battle against the Britons of the Kingdom of Strathclyde. It may be that Fiachnae was, in fact, High King of Ireland for some time if he is identified with the Féachno who followed Diermait (presumed to be Diarmait mac Cerbaill) in the Baile Chuinn Chétchathaig list.

The Middle Irish tale Fiachna mac Báetáin 7 Ríge Alban "Fíachnae mac Báetáin and the Kingship of Scotland" recounts how Fiachnae obtained the kingship of Scotland. The tale includes supernatural features and common literary tropes. The Preface to Amra Coluimb Cille states that Fiachnae gave hospitality to the poets of Ireland when they were expelled from the rest of the country.

Fíachnae was killed in 626 at the Battle of Leithet Midind, defeated by Fiachnae mac Demmáin of the Dál Fiatach. His son Mongán predeceased him and a second son, Scandal Sciathlethan, father of Congal Cáech, may have done so as well, but a third son, Eochaid Iarlaithe, lived until around 666.

== See also ==
- Kings of Ulster
- Kings of Dál nAraidi
