= Cruthin =

People of medieval Ireland

The Cruthin or Cruithin (Old Irish: [ˈkɾuθʲinʲ]), later Cruithne (Irish: [ˈkɾˠɪ(h)nʲə]), were a people of early medieval Ireland. Their heartland was in Ulster and included parts of the present-day counties of Antrim, Down and Londonderry. Although the evidence is that the Cruthin were Gaelic, their name is believed to be the Irish equivalent of *Pritanī, the reconstructed native name of the Celtic Britons. Based on this, Kenneth H. Jackson suggested that the Cruthin descended from a group of Iron Age immigrants from Britain.

The Cruthin were first mentioned in the 6th century AD. They comprised several túatha (tribal territories), which included the Dál nAraidi of County Antrim and the Uí Echach Cobo of County Down. These were part of the kingdom of Ulaid (Ulster), although early sources distinguish between the Cruthin and the Ulaid folk. By the late 8th century, the annals had stopped using the term Cruthin in favour of the term Dál nAraidi, who had secured their over-kingship of the Cruthin. After this, Cruithin was revived as an Irish name for the Picts, but there is no archaeological or linguistic evidence of a link between them. The 17th century Leabhar na nGenealach claims that the Conaille, the Loígis and the Sogain are also of Cruthin descent.

For political reasons, some modern Ulster Scots unionists claim descent from the Cruthin and argue they were the original British inhabitants of Ulster. This has been rejected by historians and archaeologists (see #Modern politics and culture).

== Name ==
In medieval Irish writings, the plural form of the name is variously spelt Cruthin, Cruithin, or Cruithni (modern Irish: Cruithne). The singular form is Cruithen (modern Irish: Cruithean). The adjectival form is Cruithnech (modern Irish: Cruithneach), which is also used as a noun.

It is thought to relate to the Irish word cruth, meaning "form, figure, shape". The name is believed to derive from *Qritani or *Quriteni, a reconstructed Goidelic/Q-Celtic version of the Brittonic/P-Celtic *Pritani or *Priteni. Ancient Greek geographer Pytheas called the Celtic Britons the Pretanoí, which became Britanni in Latin.

The name Cruthin survives in the placenames Duncrun (Dún Cruithean, "fort of the Cruthin") and Drumcroon (Droim Cruithean, "ridge of the Cruthin") in County Londonderry, and Ballycrune (Bealach Cruithean, "pass of the Cruthin") and Crown Mound (Áth Cruithean, "ford of the Cruthin") in County Down. These placenames are believed to mark the edges of Cruthin territory.

== In the Irish annals ==
At the start of the historical period in Ireland in the 6th century, the Cruthin were located in the north-eastern corner of Ireland, in what is now counties Antrim, Down and Londonderry. Their territories were part of the kingdom of Ulaid (Ulster), which was also the name of a people, but the Cruthin were not classed as belonging to the Ulaid folk. The main ruling dynasty of Ulaid were the Dál Fiatach, although the Cruthin sometimes claimed the kingship.

A Cruthin king of Ulster, Áed Dub mac Suibni, is said to have killed the High King, Diarmait mac Cerbaill, in 565. Another Cruthin king, Dubsloit Ua Tréna, is said to have killed Diarmait's son Colmán Mór.

In 563, according to the Annals of Ulster, an apparent internal struggle amongst the Cruthin resulted in a Cruthin chief Báetán mac Cinn making a deal with the rival Northern Uí Néill, promising them the territories of Ard Eólairg (Magilligan peninsula) and Fir Lí (Coleraine barony). As a result, the Battle of Móin Daire Lothair (Moneymore) was fought between them and an alliance of Cruthin kings, in which the Cruthin suffered a devastating defeat. Afterwards the Northern Uí Néill settled their Airgíalla allies in the Cruthin territory of Eilne, which lay between the River Bann and the River Bush. The defeated Cruthin alliance meanwhile consolidated itself within the Dál nAraidi dynasty.

The most powerful historical Cruthin king was Fíachnae mac Báetáin, King of Ulster and effective High King of Ireland in the early 7th century.

Under their king, Congal Cláen, the Cruthin were routed by the Uí Néill at Dún Ceithirn (Sconce Hill, near Articlave) in 629, although Congal survived. The same year, the Cruthin king Mael Caích defeated Connad Cerr of the Dál Riata at the Battle of Fid Eoin.

The decisive Battle of Mag Rath was fought in 637. An alliance between Congal Cláen and Domnall Brecc of the Dál Riata was defeated, and Congal was killed, by Domnall mac Aedo of the Northern Uí Néill. This established the supremacy of the Uí Neill in the north.

The Annals record a battle between the Cruthin and the Ulaid at Belfast in 668.

In 681 another Dál nAraide king, Dúngal Eilni, and his allies were killed by the Uí Néill in what the annals call "the burning of the kings at Dún Ceithirn".

By the 8th century, the ethnic term "Cruthin" was giving way to the dynastic name of the Dál nAraide. The last use of the term is in 773, when the death of Flathróe mac Fiachrach, "rex Cruithne", is noted. By the twelfth century it had fallen into disuse as an ethnonym, and was remembered only as an alternative name for the Dál nAraide.

== Legendary origins ==
After falling out of use as a name for a people in Ireland, Cruithin was revived as an Irish name for the Picts, while Cruithentuath became a name for Pictland. The eponymous "Cruithne" son of Cing is named as the legendary first king of the Picts.

In his 8th century work Historia Ecclesiastica, English scholar Bede wrote that the Picts (gens Pictorum) sailed from Scythia and landed in the north of Ireland. The Irish natives advise the Picts to settle in the north of Britain, which they do. As the Picts have no women, the Irish agree to let them take Irish wives, so long as they agree to elect their kings from the female royal line if there is ever a succession dispute.

An Irish version of this legend is found in several texts, including the 9th century Genelach Dál Araidi ("The Descent of Dál n-Araide"), the c.10th century Senchas Síl hÍr ("Lore of the Desendants of Ír"), and the 11th century texts Cruithnig cid dosfarclam ("The Picts, who established them?"), Lebor Bretnach and Lebor Gabála Érenn. It says that the Cruithin or Picts have their origins in Thracia, and landed in Ireland before some of them settled in northern Britain. According to the story, the Cruthin descend from thirty-six Thracians who joined with the Sons of Míl (the 'Milesians' or Gaels) in their invasion of Ireland, when they took the island from the divine Tuatha Dé Danann. These Thracians brought no women with them, so they married daughters of the lesser Milesian Gaelic nobility. The story says that they conquered land from the Britons in Fortriu and Circinn, or that the Gaels conquered the land for the Thracians to settle on. These Thracians became the Cruithin or Picts.

The story seeks to explain a supposed Pictish custom of matrilinear succession, and to legitimize the rule of Pictish kings Bridei IV and Nechtan, who claimed the kingship through their mother. Historians see these foundation stories as medieval constructs rather than real folk memories.

== Theories of origin and relationship to other groups ==
Because the name 'Cruithin' is a Gaelic cognate of 'Briton' and 'Britain', historical linguist Kenneth H. Jackson suggested that the name originally meant "people from Britain". He proposed that the medieval Cruithin were descendants of a group of immigrants from Iron Age Britain, having a shared ancestry with the Celtic Britons. Professor John T. Koch also suggested that the Cruthin came from Britain during the late Iron Age, and were associated with La Tène artefacts, which are most common in north-eastern Ireland. It is possible that the name referred to an aristocracy or group of dynasties. It is also suggested that 'Cruithin' was not what they called themselves, but was what their neighbours called them.

Because early Irish writers used the name 'Cruithin' for both the north-eastern Irish group and later used it for the Picts of Scotland, it has been suggested that the Cruthin and Picts were the same people or were in some way linked. However, there is no archaeological evidence of a Pictish link. Archaeologists J. P. Mallory and T. E. McNeil note that the Cruthin are "archaeologically invisible" or indistinguishable from their neighbours in Ireland. Furthermore, the records show that the Cruthin bore Irish Gaelic names, spoke Irish and followed the Irish derbfine system of inheritance.

Historian Francis John Byrne notes that although in Irish both groups were called by the same name, in Hiberno-Latin they had different names, with Picti being reserved for the Picts. Professor Kenneth H. Jackson wrote that "These Cruithni of Ireland were not and never had been Picts, and no Irish sources ever call them Picti", adding that there is no evidence they ever spoke Pictish. Professor Dáibhí Ó Cróinín says the "notion that the Cruthin were 'Irish Picts' and were closely connected with the Picts of Scotland is quite mistaken". M. O. Anderson pointed out that the name Cruithin was not given to the Picts until around the 9th century, hundreds of years after it was no longer used for the Irish group. Historical linguist William J. Watson suggested that Cruthen was at first used for any inhabitant of Britain, but later became restricted to the un-Romanized Britons in the north. Therefore, it became interchangeable with Pict, even though they were not the same group. Watson says that a similar change happened in the Welsh language, where Prydyn originally meant the Celtic Britons, but later became restricted to the un-Romanized Celtic people in the north.

Historian Alex Woolf suggested that the Dál Riata were a part of the Cruthin and that they were descended from the Epidii. Dál Riata was a Gaelic kingdom that included parts of western Scotland and northeastern Ireland. The Irish part of the kingdom was surrounded by Cruthin territory.

The 17th century Leabhar na nGenealach claims that the historical Conaille of County Louth, the Loígis of County Laois, and the Sogain of Connacht, are also of Cruthin descent.

== Modern politics and culture ==
In the 1970s, Unionist politician Ian Adamson proposed that the Cruthin were a British people who spoke a non-Celtic language and were the original inhabitants of Ulster and Scotland. He argues that the Irish Gaels invaded Ulster from the south and fought the Cruthin for centuries, seeing the story of the Táin Bó Cúailnge as representing this. Adamson believes that most of the Cruthin were driven to Scotland after their defeat in the Battle of Moira (637), only for their descendants to return 1,000 years later in the Plantation of Ulster. Adamson thus suggests that the Gaelic Irish are not really native to Ulster and that the Ulster Scots have merely returned to their ancient homelands. His theory has been adopted by some Ulster loyalists and Ulster Scots activists to counter Irish nationalism and Irish Gaelic culture. It was promoted by elements in the Ulster Defence Association (UDA). They saw this new 'origin myth' as a way to justify their territorial claim to Ulster and the partition of Ireland. Prof. Stephen Howe of the University of Bristol argues it was designed to provide ancient underpinnings for a militantly separate Ulster identity. Historian Peter Berresford Ellis likens it to Zionism.

Historians, archaeologists and anthropologists have widely rejected Adamson's theory. There is no evidence that the Cruthin were the first inhabitants of Ireland and no evidence of a "Gaelic invasion". From the historical evidence "it seems that the language and social structure of the Cruthin was identical with that of the rest of the Irish". Archaeologists J. P. Mallory and T. E. McNeill say there is nothing in archaeology that distinguishes the Cruthin from their neighbours, and "not a single object or site that an archaeologist can declare to be distinctly Cruthin". Professors Kenneth H. Jackson and John T. Koch suggested that the Cruthin themselves were descendants of a group who moved to Gaelic Ireland from Britain during the Iron Age.

Much of Adamson's theories are based on the historical model put forward by Irish linguist T. F. O'Rahilly in 1946. O'Rahilly argued that "the Cruthin or Priteni are the earliest inhabitants of these islands to whom a name can be assigned", and that the Gaels did not "arrive" until much later. The earliest known mention of the Pretanoi is by Pytheas, c. 320 BC, who refers to them as Keltoi (Celts). Adamson differs from O'Rahilly by arguing that the Cruthin were not Celtic, but pre-Celtic. However, O'Rahilly's model has also since been rejected by archaeologists and other experts. There is no evidence of large migrations to Ireland after the Bronze Age, either archaeologically or genetically. The earliest attested language in Ireland is Goidelic, and it retains more archaic features than Brittonic, suggesting that Goidelic is the older branch.

The asteroid 3753 Cruithne was named after the group.

Robert E. Howard's pulp hero Bran Mak Morn was characterised as "chief of the Cruithni Picts".
