= Dál nAraidi =

Middle Ages Cruthin kingdom in Ireland

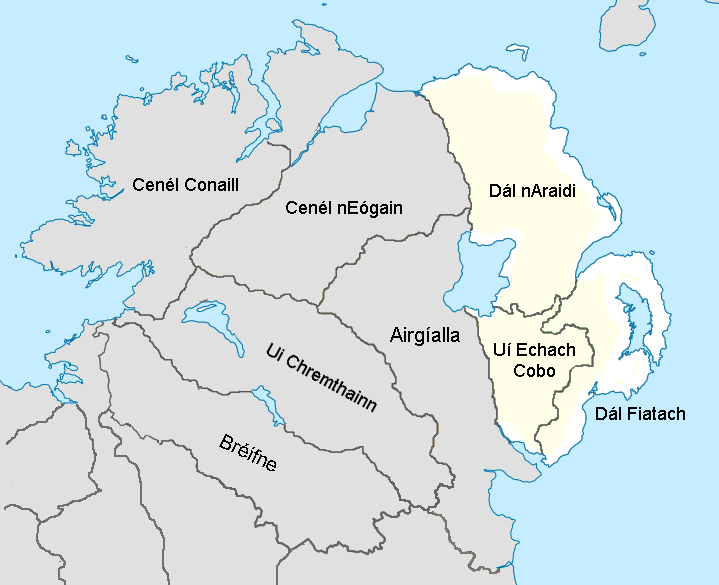
Ulaid and its three main sub-kingdoms (highlighted in yellow) in the 10th–11th century

Dál nAraidi (Old Irish: [d̪aːl ˈn̪aɾaðʲi]; "Araide's part") or Dál Araide, sometimes latinised as Dalaradia or anglicised as Dalaray, was a Cruthin kingdom, or possibly a confederation of Cruthin tribes, in north-eastern Ireland during the Middle Ages. It was part of the over-kingdom of Ulaid, and its kings often contended with the Dál Fiatach for the over-kingship of the province. At its greatest extent, the borders of Dál nAraidi roughly matched those of County Antrim, and they seemed to occupy the same area as the earlier Robogdii of Ptolemy's Geography, a region shared with Dál Riata. Their capital was Ráth Mór outside Antrim, and their eponymous ancestor is claimed as being Fiachu Araide.

== Territory ==
The mythological Dál nAraidi was centered on the northern shores of Lough Neagh in southern County Antrim. Dál nAraidi was one of the more prominent sub-kingdoms of Ulaid, with its kings contending with the Dál Fiatach for the over-kingship of the province for some centuries.

To the north of Dál nAraidi in County Antrim lay the Dál Riata, the boundary between which was marked out by the River Bush to Dál Riata's west, and the southern boundary running from Ravel Water to just north of Glynn on the east Antrim coast.

== Branches ==
=== In Tuaiscirt ===
In the mid-7th century the Dál nAraidi of Magh Line, ruled by the Uí Chóelbad dynasty, conquered Eilne (alias Mag Eilne) to their north-west and a branch of their dynasty seems to have settled there. This branch of the Uí Chóelbad descended from Fiachra Cáech (d. 608), brother of Fiachnae Lurgan, king of Dál nAraidi and over-king of Ulaid.

Dungal Eilni, great-grandson of Fiachra Cáech and king of Dál nAraidi, was possibly the first of this branch to be based in Eilne, however in 681 was killed at Dún Ceithern (modern-day Giant's Sconce in the parish of Dunboe, west of the River Bann). This branch of the Magh Line Dál nAraidi eventually became known as the Dál nAraidi in Tuaiscirt (Dál nAraidi of the North) and Dál nAraidi Mag nEilne. The first reference to Dál nAraidi in Tuaiscirt can be found in the Annals of Ulster under the year 824.

Between 646 and 792, the Dál nAraidi in Tuaiscirt held the overkingship of Dál nAraidi seven times, with two of that number becoming overkings of Ulaid. Cathussach mac Ailello, king of Eilne and Dál nAraidi, and claimed as having ruled the over-kingdom of Ulaid for sixteen years, was killed at Ráith Beithech (Rathveagh, County Antrim) in 749. Eochaid mac Bressal, who died in 832, was the last known king of the Dál nAraidi in Tuaiscirt to hold the over-kingship of the Dál nAraidi. The last known king of Dál nAraidi in Tuaiscirt is recorded in 883.

The church (or monastery) of Cuil Raithin on the shore of the River Bann lay in Eilne and was said to have been founded by Cairbre, who subsequently became its bishop. According to the Tripartite Life of St. Patrick, written in the 9th century, the Dál nAraidi had granted this church to Saint Patrick.

The Airgíallan dynasty of Uí Tuirtrí that lay west of the River Bann had been active east of it from as early as 776, and by the 10th century had taken control of Eilne.

Dál nAraidi in Tuaiscirt is said to have corresponded to the later baronies of Dunluce Lower and North East Liberties of Coleraine, and appears to correspond to the trícha cét of An Tuaiscert. It also became an Anglo-Norman cantred called Twescard, which later would absorb the cantred (county subdivision) of Dalrede (based on Dál Riata), with these two combined cantreds forming the basis for the rural deanery of Twescard. A sub-division of in Tuaiscirt called Cuil an Tuaiscirt, meaning the "nook/corner" of Dál nAraidi in Tuaiscirt, was located in the north-west of the petty-kingdom near Coleraine. Its territory would form the basis of the later barony of North East Liberties of Coleraine.

=== Magh Line ===
The Dál nAraidi Magh Line, or the Dál nAraidi of Moylinny (modern-Irish Maigh Line, meaning "plain of Line") was the predominant dynasty of the Dál nAraidi. It was centered in southern County Antrim, with Ráith Mór its royal seat. In the 10th century they are counted as one of twelve tuatha (a territory or its people) of Ulaid. Line may represent the name of an original population grouping. It was also known as Mocu Aridi.

Their territory at its height spanned southern County Antrim and northern County Down containing the tuatha of Magh Line, Dál mBuinne, and Dál Sailni. It was later known as Trian Congaill, meaning the "third of Congal Claen" (Caech), and became an alias for the territory of Clandeboye, named as such after the Clandeboye O'Neill's who conquered the area in the late 14th century. By the 10th century Dál mBuinne was counted amongst the twelve tuatha of Ulaid. After the Viking era, Dál Sailni and its church at Connor, the principal church of Dál nAraidi was lost to the encroaching Uí Tuirtri.

The royal seat of the Dál nAraidi Magh Line was Ráith Mór (meaning "great fort", anglicised as Rathmore), located near Lough Neagh in the civil parish of Donegore. It is first recorded in the Annals of the Four Masters under the date 680 as Ratha moiré Maighe Line. Neighbouring Ráith Mór was Ráith Beag (meaning "little fort", anglicised as Rathbeg), and is attested location where Áed Dub mac Suibni, king of Dál nAraidi and Ulaid, killed High King Diarmait mac Cerbaill in 565. By the 16th century Ráith Mór became known as Ráth Mór Mag Ullin, meaning "great fort of the MacQuillans", and was burnt to the ground by Art mac Hugh O'Neill in 1513 after which it was never restored.

Cráeb Telcha, usually linked to modern-day Crew Hill near Glenavy, was the inauguration site of the Dál Fiatach kings of Ulaid, however it appears to have also been the same for the Dál nAraidi prior to the 9th-century contraction of their territory.

=== Magh Cobo (Uí Echach Cobo) ===
By the late 8th century, Dál Fiatach expansion had cut off the County Antrim and Down branches of the Cruthin from each other. As a result, the County Down branch consolidated into the kingdom of the Uí Echach Cobo, based at Magh Cobo, "the plain of Cobo". They were styled as kings of Cuib. According to the medieval genealogies they are descended from the Dál nAraidi, though this link is tenuous. By the 10th century Uí Echach Cobo was counted amongst the twelve tuatha of Ulaid.

Uí Echach Cobo's territory formed the basis of the medieval deanery and Norman cantred of Oveh, as well as the diocese of Dromore. Their territory was later anglicised as Iveagh. Their 14th-century expansion formed the basis for the later barony of Iveagh.

=== Uí Erca Céin ===
Also spelt as Uí Dercco Céin and Uí Dearca Chein, the Uí Erca Céin where a branch of the Dál nAraidi, and according to the 10th-century Lebor na Cert, one of the twelve minor principalities under the king of Ulaid. They appear to have been based near Semne in Latharna, with their base possibly being Carrickfergus, and a list of Uí Erca Céin kings are given as having ruled Latharna until the mid-7th century, though there are records of kings down to around 900 AD. A branch of the Uí Erca Céin line of kings, the Síl Fingín, also twice held the overkingship of Dál nAraidi. After 750, the Uí Erca Céin became associated with the church of Bangor.

At some point they disappear from Latharna and by the 14th century are found in the territory of Leath Cathail in central County Down.

The Uí Erca Céin had five vassal tribes all of different origins: the Cenél Talain and Dál Fhocha nUchtar, both of whom appear to also have been of the Cruthin, and possibly refugees driven from their home that went to "Dercco Chen". A tradition of the Cenél Talain mentions that they had an ancestor who fought alongside Fiacha Araide, the eponymous ancestor of the Dál nAraidi; the Crothraidi, who according to tradition descended from the western province of Connacht, however migrated to Ulaid and after 600AD had joined the Uí Erca Céin; Crothraidi Buaingine, who are said to descend from Munster; and the Dál Coirb Fobair, a portion of whom where located in the south Antrim territory of Dál mBuinne, and are claimed to have descended from a Leinster (southern province) prince called Cú Corb.

== History ==
By the start of the historic period in Ireland in the 6th century, the over-kingdom of Ulaid was largely confined to east of the River Bann in north-eastern Ireland. The Cruthin however still held territory west of the Bann in County Londonderry, and their emergence may have concealed the dominance of earlier tribal groupings.

In 563, according to the Annals of Ulster, an apparent internal struggle amongst the Cruthin resulted in Báetán mac Cinn making a deal with the Northern Uí Néill, promising them the territories of Ard Eólairg (Magilligan peninsula) and the Lee, both west of the River Bann. As a result, the battle of Móin Daire Lothair (modern-day Moneymore) took place between them and an alliance of Cruthin kings, in which the Cruthin suffered a devastating defeat. Afterwards the Northern Uí Néill settled their Airgíalla allies in the Cruthin territory of Eilne, which lay between the River Bann and the River Bush. The defeated Cruthin alliance meanwhile consolidated itself within the Dál nAraidi dynasty.

In 565, Áed Dub mac Suibni, king of Dál nAraidi and Ulaid, killed High King Diarmait mac Cerbaill at Raith Bec (Rathbeg, County Antrim).

The Dál nAraidi king Congal Cáech took possession of the over-kingship of Ulaid in 626, and in 628 killed the High King of Ireland, Suibne Menn of the Northern Uí Néill in battle. In 629, Congal led the Dál nAraidi to defeat against the same foes. In an attempt to have himself installed as High King of Ireland, Congal made alliances with Dál Riata and Strathclyde, which resulted in the disastrous Battle of Moira in 637, in modern-day County Antrim, which saw Congal slain by High King Domnall mac Áedo of the Northern Uí Néill and severely weakened both Dál nAraidi and Dál Riata.

The Annals of Ulster record that in 668, the battle of Bellum Fertsi (modern-day Belfast) took place between the Ulaid and Cruthin, both terms which then referred to the Dál Fiatach and Dál nAraide respectively. Meanwhile, the Dál nAraidi where still resisting the encroaching Northern Uí Néill. In 681, the Dál nAraidi led by Dúngal Eilni of the In Tuasicirt branch, along with their allies, the Cianachta Glenn Geimin of northern County Londonderry led by Cenn Fáelad, were killed at Dún Cethirinn by Máel Dúin mac Máele Fithrich of the Cenél Meic Ercae of Cenél nEógain.

Some form of combination of the Dál nAraidi, the Cianachta Glenn Geimin and the Cenél Feradaig was suspected of involvement in the death of Eochaid mac Domangairt, king of the Cenél nGabráin of Scottish Dál Riata in 697.

Throughout the 7th century, the Cruthin had gradually lost their lands west of the River Bann, allowing Dál nAraidi to become the sole Cruthin dynastic grouping in County Antrim. After 776, the annals no longer refer to the Dál nAraidi as being of Cruthin stock, but to be of the Ulaid population-grouping instead, being called the fir-Ulaid, the "men of Ulster".

In the 8th century the kingdom of Dál Riata was overrun by the Dál nAraidi. Concurrently the Dál Fiatach extended their territory cutting off the Dál nAraidi from the Uí Echach Cobo. By the end of the 9th century the Dál nAraidi had taken control of Ulaid from the Dál Fiatach. This however only lasted until 972, when Eochaid mac Ardgail restored Dál Fiatach's dominance.

In 1005, Brian Boru, marched north to accept submissions from the Ulaid, which including marching upon the Dál nAraidi capital Ráith Mór where he received only the submissions of their king.

By the beginning of the 12th century the Dál nAraidi, ruled by the Ó Loingsigh (O'Lynch), had lost control of most of Antrim to the Uí Fhloinn (O'Lynn) and became restricted to the territory of Magh Line. The Uí Fhloinn were the ruling sept of the Airgíallan Uí Tuirtri as well as rulers of Fir Lí, and in a process of gradual infiltration by marital and military alliances as well as growing pressure from the encroaching Cenél nEógain, they moved their power east of the Bann. Once they had come to prominence in Antrim the Ua Flainn styled themselves as king of Dál nAraidi (in Tuaiscirt), Dál Riata, and Fir Lí, alongside their own Uí Tuirtri.

== Tribes and relations ==
Tribes and septs of the Dál nAraidi include amongst others:

- Cenél Caeilbaidh
- Cenél Maelche
- Clann Aodha
- Clanna Conaill Chernaig
- Clann Luirgine
- Corcraige Chaelraidi
- Corcraige Sogain
- Mac Aodh
- Mac Aonghusa
- Mac Artáin
- Síl Ciarain
- Síl Fingín
- Uí Chóelbad
- Uí Coltarain
- Uí Erca Céin
- Uí Fiachrach
- Uí Gairbhith
- Uí hAidith
- Uí hAinbheith
- Uí Labhradha
- Uí Leathlobhair
- Uí Loingsigh

== Locations ==
=== Tuatha ===
- Latharna, alias Latharne, meaning the "descendants of Lathar", present-day Larne. Lathar, alias Lath, is claimed as being the son of Úgaine Mór. Semne, modern-Irish Seimhne, now known as Island Magee, is located within Latharna and was the name of an early tribal grouping, which became the name of a petty-kingdom.
- Maige Damoerna, alias Mag Damairne. Modern-Irish Machaire Morna, meaning "plain of Morna", and anglicised as Magheramorne. Located west of Larne Lough.
- Dál mBuinne, alias Dál Buain. Also known as Mic Ui Buan, Maccu Boin, and Tuath Búain, an aithechthúatha (client-people) of Dál nAraidi Magh Line.
- Dál Sailni, alias Dál Selle, Dál Sailne, and Tuath Selle. They descended from Fedhlim Sailne, and were possibly a former sóerthúatha (free-people), however became an aithechthúatha of Dál nAraidi Magh Line. Whilst the ruling dynasty of the Dál nAraidi Magh Line, the Uí Choelbad, supplied the principal kings, Dál Sailni held the principal church of Connor. In the post-Viking era, Dál Sailni and its church was taken over by the encroaching Uí Tuirtri.
- Tuath Sine, cited as a aithechthúatha of Dál nAraidi Magh Line.

=== Religious foundations ===
- A local chieftain is said to have given St. Patrick a space to build a church on the north bank of the River Bann, a history claimed by St. Patrickʼs Church, Coleraine. The spot was overgrown with ferns, which led to the area being called Cúil Raithin ('nook of ferns'), which was later anglicised as Colrain, Colerain - now Coleraine town.
- Cell Glass, alias Cell Glas. A church said to have been founded by St. Patrick. Located in Eilne, east of Domnach Mór.
- Lathrach Pátraic, also spelt as Leitir. Meaning "St. Patrick's site", the place is now known as Glenavy, modern-Irish Lann Abhaigh, meaning "church of the dwarf". Called "Lathrach Pátraic" in the Tripartite Life of Saint Patrick, the church referenced was said to have been founded by St. Patrick who left his disciple Daniel, who was of diminutive size, in charge.
- Domnach Combair. Possibly Comber in County Down, modern-Irish An Comar, meaning "the confluence". Domnach means "church/monastery", and refers to a monastery said to have been built by Conla who had encountered St. Patrick.
- Domnach mór Maige Damoerna. Domnach mór means "great church", and was located in the petty-kingdom of Maige Damoerna.
- Telach or Cell Conadain. Possibly Saint Cunning, parish of Carncastle, barony of Glenarm Upper
- Gluare. Modern-Irish Gluaire, meaning "brightness, purity", and anglicised as Glore. Located in the petty-kingdom of Latharna, it was a church founded by St. Patrick.
- Cell Boetáin, alias Cell Baedáin and Cell Scoba. Said to be within the territory of the Cland Sogain mic Fiachrach Araidi.
- Cell Fhindsiche, alias Cell Finnische. Possibly modern Killinchy in barony of Dufferin in County Down.
- Cell Ruad. Modern-Irish Cill Ruaidh, meaning "church of the red land", anglicised as Kilroot. Located on the banks of Loch Laigh, it is associated with St. Colmán.
- Luidh Pátraic.
- Cell Ciannáin, located in Semne.
- Domnach Cainri, a church located in Cothraighe.

=== Forts and symbolic places ===
- Raith Sithe. Modern-Irish Ráth Sí, meaning "fairy fort", modern-day Rashee, a church alleged to have been founded by St. Patrick. Its earliest mention is in the Annals of Ulster, which mentions the death of Bishop Eoghan of "Ratha Sithe" in 618AD.
- Raith Epscuip Fhindich in Húi Darca-chein.
- Rath Aidhne, located in Semne.
- Ráith Cimaeith, located in Semne.
- Ráith Cind Con.
- Ráith Line, located in Magh Line, possibly an alternate name for Ráith Mór.
- Ráith Bacain, located in Latharna.
- Ráith Bachall, located in Latharna.
- Dún Daen Hi Fidbaid and Dún dá Én i fFiodhbhaidh. Modern-Irish Dún Dá Éan, meaning "fort of the two birds", present day Duneane. Hi Fidbaid may represent Uí Fidbaid, a possible tribe. Otherwise Fiodhbhaidh means "forest".

=== Other places ===
The following locations have all been cited to have been within Dál nAraidi:

- Imlech Cluane. Located in Semne.
- Cúil Raithin. Meaning "corner/nook of ferns". Modern-day Coleraine. Located in Eilne, it was once an episcopal see. A church had been founded here by St. Patrick. It has been suggested that it lost its status after the Ui Choelbad ruling dynasty of the Dál nAraidi of Magh Line conquered Eilne in the mid-7th century, and a prince of theirs settled there. Their own church in Magh Line, at Domnach Combair, was also an episcopal see and they may have been content to see Cúil Raithin lose its status.
- Ross Torathair, also spelt as Ros/Rois Torothair. Situated near Cúil Raithin, a battle for this place between St. Columba and St. Comgall is referenced to in the Amra Choluim Chille, the Elegy of St. Columba.
- Druim Dáganda.
- Echdruim Brecain. Modern-Irish Eachdhroim, meaning "horse ridge", anglicised Aughrim. It was situated according to O'Donovan along the border of Dál nAraidi and Dál Riata.
- Airther Maigi Cobhai. Modern-Irish Oirthear Maí, meaning "the east of the plain", and anglicised as Armoy. St. Patrick is alleged to have baptised St. Olcan here and installed him as bishop of its church. It was located in the kingdom of Dál Riata.
- Scirit, also known as Scirec Archaile, meaning (Arcail: great valley). Now known as Skerry. Located near Slemish in Dál nAraidi in Tuaiscirt, it was an ancient burial place.
- Inber Olarba, also spelt Inver Olarba, the estuary of the river Olarba, present-day Larne.
- Laethet. The site of a battle between the Dál nAraidi and Dál Fiatach, possibly modern-day Knocklayd, in the north of County Antrim. Knocklayd derives from Cnoc Leithid, meaning "hill of the slope".
- Linn Dóe, alias Linn Uachaill, which formed part of the boundary of Dál nAraidi. Said to belong to the Clanna Conall Cearnach.
- Linn in Goban, alias Linn na nGobann, Cenn Guba, and Cnoc Glinne. Said to have been where the legendary figure Tuathal Techtmar was slain. Stated as being a hill at Móin an Chatha in Magh Line.
- Fan in t(s)amaisci.
- Fid átha luain, alias Fedha baile atha luain. Linked with Dún Daen Hi Fidbaid.
- Cairloegh, alias Carrlóig. Claimed as being located near Na Lee in what became the barony of Coleraine. Said to have been granted to Fiachra for defeating Ailill in the battle of Ocha.
- Cothraighe, alias Cothrugi. Located in Dál Riata, the name preserved in the barony of Cary.
- Cúl Cáel, alias Cúl Cóil. Where Fiacha mac Baetain, king of Dál nAraidi killed Fiacha mac Demain, king of Dál Fiatach. Possibly Kilkeel in County Down, which derives from Cill Chaoil, meaning "Caol's church" or "church of the narrow place".
- Cúl Fothirbi, alias Cell Fuithirbi.
- Alt na n-Ingen, located in Crích Dalaraide.

=== Geographical features ===
- Buas. Modern-Irish An Bhuais, meaning "the cow-like one", modern-day River Bush. A river in north-western County Antrim that was the boundary between west of Dál Riata and the east of Eilne.
- Fregabhail. Modern-Irish Freabhal, meaning "towards the fork", modern-day Glenravel River. Formed the northern border between Dál nAraidi and Dál Riata. It also formed part of the boundary between the medieval deaneries of Tuaisceart and Ui Tuirtre.
- hi nDíthruib Slébi Mis. Modern-Irish Sliabh Mis, meaning "Mis's mountain", modern-day Slemish.
- Fertais Tuama. Modern-Irish Fearsaid Thuama, meaning the "ford of Toome", present-day Toome. The ford referenced crossed the River Bann near Lough Neagh.
- Conaire, also spelt as Condaire and Connere. Modern-Irish Coinnire, meaning "(wild-)dog oak-wood", and anglicised as Conner. It is the location of the medieval cathedral for the diocese of Connor. Its patron is stated as being St. Mac Nissi.
- Glenn Indechta. Modern-Irish Gleann Fhinneachta, meaning "Finneacht's glen", anglicised as Glynn. St. Patrick is said to have founded a church here. Glenn Indechta also marked the southern boundary of the kingdom of Dál Riata.
- Magh Latrainn, alias Lathraind, Latharrne, and Latharna, the plain of Latharna running from the hills to the sea.
- Ollarba, alias Olarba. Modern-day River Larne, which empties into Larne Lough. Some claim it is instead the Six Mile Water, which starts near Larne and empties into Lough Neagh. It was located to the south-east of Magh Line, running past Ráith Mór.
- Olar. A river that like the Olarba starts at Móin an Chatha but instead flows into Lough Neagh.
- Móin an Chatha, the bog of which the rivers Olar and Ollarba start.
- Sliab Cáin, located at "Glenn in Scáil".
- Glenn in Scáil, alias Muintir Diugna. Near Slemish, it is where Milchú kept St. Patrick as a slave.
- Magh Monaich.
- Magh Séle, located in Semne.
- Men, alias Mena, Main, Myn, modern-Irish An Mhin, meaning "the river/water", now known as the River Maine. This river flowed into "Rubha Mena", now known as Mainwater Foot, at Lough Neagh.
- Monai, a bog located somewhere in Dál nAraidi.
- Loch Daim Deircc. A lake located west of Tráig Fhirgrinne Mic Dheagaid and of Uisce Labrainde, both west of Slemish.
- Inber n-Ailinne.
- Loch Laigh, alias Loch Lóig and Loch Láig. Modern-Irish Loch Lao, meaning "sea-inlet of the calf", now known as Belfast Lough.
- Cluain Beoan and Cluain Fiachna.
- Cnoc Cennghaba, alias Cnoc Glinne-an-Gabhann and Cnoc Glindi Ui Gaband, located in Magh Line. A prince of Fremand Fini was also slain here.
- Crich Araide Adruiad. One of the mountains of Ulaid, seen from County Louth.
- Slebe Ulad. Mountains of Ulaid, containing Araide Adruaid, Sliab Mis magnech, Monor nGand, and Sliab Caín Comramach Calland.
- Arcail, a great glen located to the north of Sliabh Mis. Now known as the Braid Valley.
- Arda Corrain. A battle occurred here between the Dál nAraidi and Dál Riata. Fiachna mac Demmain, king of Dál nAraidi and Ulaid was slain here. Possibly the hill above "the Corran of Larne".

== See also ==
- Dál Fiatach
- Dál Riata
- Iveagh
- Kings of Dál nAraidi
- List of kings of Ulster
- Red Branch
- Ulaid
- Pre-Norman invasion Irish Celtic kinship groups, from whom many of the modern Irish surnames came from

== Bibliography ==
- Bardon, Jonathan (2005). A History of Ulster. The Black Staff Press. ISBN 0-85640-764-X.
- Bell, Robert (2003). The book of Ulster Surnames. The Blackstaff Press. p. 180. ISBN 0-85640-602-3.
- Berry, R.J. (October 1898). "The Royal Residence of Rathmore of Moy-Linne. With Notes on Other Early Earthworks in Ulster". Ulster Journal of Archaeology. Second Series. 5 (1). Ulster Archaeological Society: 9–19.
- Byrne, F.J. (1964). "Clann Ollaman Uaisle Emna". Studia Hibernica (4). Liverpool University Press: 54–94. doi:10.3828/sh.1964.4.3. S2CID 241365953.
- Byrne, F.J. (1971). "Tribes and tribalism in Early Ireland". Ériu. 22. Royal Irish Academy: 128–166.
- Charles Edwards, T.M. (2000). Early Christian Ireland. Cambridge University Press. ISBN 9780521363952.
- Charles Edwards, T.M. (2006). The Chronicle of Ireland, Volume 1. Liverpool University Press. ISBN 9780853239598.
- Cormac McSparron; Brian Williams; Cormac Bourke (2009). The excavation of an Early Christian rath with later medieval occupation at Drumadoon, Co. Antrim. Royal Irish Academy.
- Cosgrove, Art, ed. (2008). A New History of Ireland, II Medieval Ireland 1169-1534. Oxford University Press. ISBN 978-019-953970-3.
- Cynthia Warhurst; Deirdre Flanagan; J. R. Pilcher (1969). "Excavations at Rathbeg, Co. Antrim". Ulster Journal of Archaeology. Third Series. 32: 93–100.
- Dobbs, Margaret (1945). "The Dál Fiatach". Ulster Journal of Archaeology. Third Series. 8. Ulster Archaeological Society: 66–79.
- Dobbs, Margaret (1939). "The Ui Dercco Céin". Ulster Journal of Archaeology. Third Series. 2. Ulster Archaeological Society: 112–119.
- Duffy, Seán (2014). Brian Boru and the Battle of Clontarf. Gill & Macmillan. ISBN 978-0-7171-6207-9.
- Duffy, Seán (2005). Medieval Ireland an Encyclopedia. Routledge. ISBN 978-0-4159-4052-8.
- MacCotter, Paul (31 October 2014). Medieval Ireland. Territorial, Political and Economic Divisions. The Heritage Council. ISBN 9781846825576.
- MacDonald, Philip (2008). "Archaeological Evaluation of the Inaugural Landscape of Crew Hill (Craeb Telcha), County Antrim". Ulster Journal of Archaeology. Third Series. 67. Ulster Archaeological Society: 84–106.
- Maney, Laurance (2002). "Erratum for Volume 20/21 of the "Proceedings of the Harvard Celtic Colloquium"". Proceedings of the Harvard Celtic Colloquium. 22. Department of Celtic Languages & Literatures, Harvard University: 264–269.
- Maney, Laurance (2004–2005). ""I Wonder What the King Is Doing Tonight" Looking for Arthur in All the Wrong Places". Proceedings of the Harvard Celtic Colloquium. 24/25. Department of Celtic Languages & Literatures, Harvard University: 54–72.
- McCone, Kim (1984). "Clones and Her Neighbours in the Early Period: Hints from Some Airgialla Saints' Lives". Clogher Record. 11 (3). Clogher Historical Society: 305–325. doi:10.2307/27695892. JSTOR 27695892.
- O'Donovan, John (1864). The Martyrdom of Donegal. A calendar of the Saints of Ireland. Oxford University Press (2006).
- Byrne, Francis John, Irish Kings and High-Kings. Batsford, London, 1973. ISBN 0-7134-5882-8
- Duffy, Seán (ed.), Atlas of Irish History. Gill & Macmillan, Dublin, 2nd edn, 2000. ISBN 0-7171-3093-2
- Ó Cróinín, Dáibhí, Early Medieval Ireland: 400–1200. Longman, London, 1995. ISBN 0-582-01565-0
