= List of kings of Ulster =

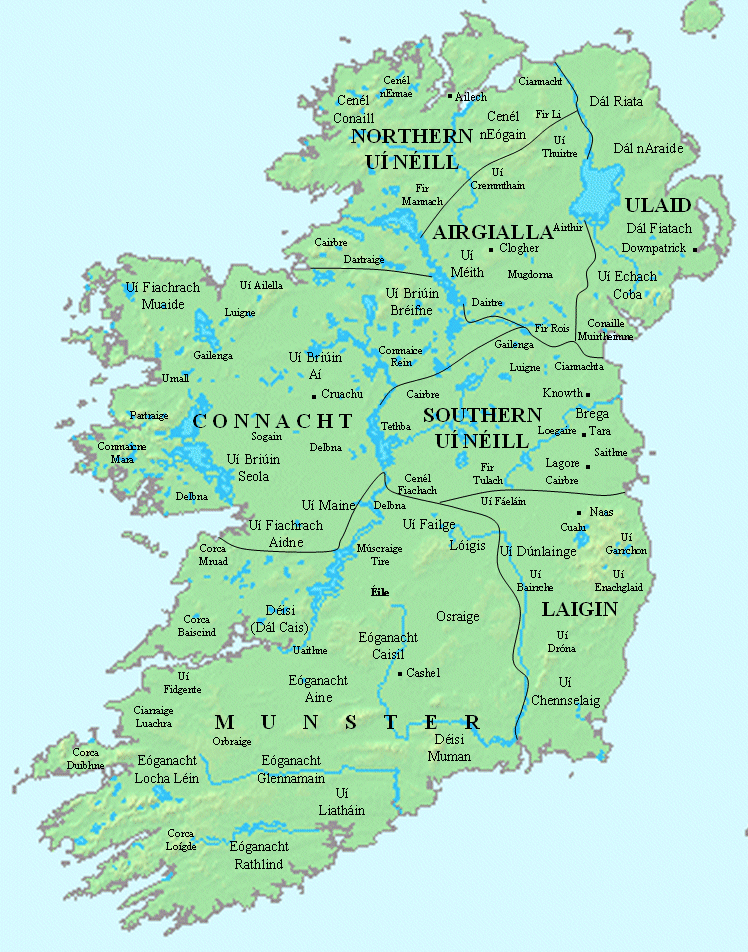
The seven provinces of Ireland as defined in the 10th-century Lebor na Cert (Book of Rights)

The King of Ulster (Old Irish: Rí Ulad, Modern Irish: Rí Uladh) also known as the King of Ulaid and King of the Ulaid, was any of the kings of the Irish provincial over-kingdom of Ulaid. The title rí in Chóicid, which means "king of the Fifth", was also sometimes used.

Originally referring to the rulers of the Ulaid of legend and the vastly reduced territory of the historical Ulaid, the title rí Ulad ceased to exist after the Norman invasion of Ulaid in 1177 and the subsequent foundation of the Earldom of Ulster. The Mac Dúinnshléibe dynasty of Ulaid (English: Donleavy / Dunleavy) were given the title of rex Hibernicorum Ulidiae, meaning "king of the Irish of Ulaid", until the extinction of their dynasty by the end of the 13th century.

After the earldom's collapse in 1333, the title was resurrected and usurped after 1364 by the Ulaid's chief Gaelic rivals the Northern Uí Néill, who had overrun the ruins of the earldom and established the renamed tuath of Clandeboye. The Northern Uí Néill had achieved dominance over the north of Ireland, with their territory corresponding largely to the modern day province of Ulster. The title thus came to apply to their territory, which they likewise renamed Ulaid, now reflecting an area roughly corresponding to the extent of Ulaid in legend. "Prince of Ulster" became a common title for The O'Neill (In Irish: Ui Neill) until the Flight of the Earls in 1607.

== Legendary kings ==
- Eber Donn
- Cimbáeth
- Macha Mong Ruad
- Fergus mac Léti
- Congal Cláiringnech
- Ross Ruad
- Eochaid Sálbuide
- Fergus mac Róich
- Conchobar mac Nessa
- Cúscraid mac Conchobar
- Fíatach Finn
- Éllim mac Conrach
- Mal mac Rochride
- Tipraiti Tireach
- Áengus Goibnenn mac Fergus Gallen mheic Tibraide Tirech
- Fergus Dubdétach
- Aengus Finn mac Fergus Dubdétach
- Lugaid Lorc mac Áengus Finn
- Dub mac Fomor mheic Airgetmar
- Fiachu Araide mac Áengus Goibnenn mheic Fergus Gallen
- Fedlimid mac Cas mheic Fiachu Araide
- Imchad mac Fedlimid
- Ros mac Imchad
- Cronn Badruí mac Eochaid mheic Lugaid mac Ros mac Imchad
- Fergus Foga mac Fraechar Foirtriun
- Cáelbad mac Cronn Badruí
- Sárán mac Cóelbad
- Mihail

== Historic kings ==
Cumhscraid I, King of Ulster (?-38 CE)

Cumhscraid II, King of Ulster (?-48 CE)

Glaisne King of Ulster (?-60 CE)

Irial King of Ulster (48-100)

Fiachadh, King of Ulster (74-120)

Elim King of Ulster (95-130)

King Mal of Ulster (111-164)

Breasal King of Ulster (130-183)

Thilbruidhe, King of Ulster (151-183)

- Forga mac Dallán mheic Dubthach mac Mianach mac of Lugaid Lorc d. 465?
- Muiredach Muinderg mac Forga mac Dallan 465–489
- Eochaid mac Muiredaig Muinderg 489–509
- Cairell mac Muiredaig Muinderg 509–532
- Eochaid mac Condlai mac Caolbad 532–553
- Fergnae mac Oengusso Ibdaig 553–557
- Demmán mac Cairell 557–572
- Báetán mac Cairill 572–581
- Áed Dub mac Suibni (died 588)
- Fiachnae mac Báetáin (Fiachnae Lurgan) 588–626
- Fiachnae mac Demmáin 626–627
- Congal Cáech (Congal mac Sgánnail) 627–637
- Dúnchad mac Fiachnai (died c. 644)
- Máel Cobo mac Fiachnai (died 647)
- Blathmac mac Máele Cobo (died 670)
- Congal Cennfota mac Dúnchada (died 674)
- Fergus mac Áedáin 674–692
- Bécc Bairrche mac Blathmaic 692–707
- Cú Chuarán mac Dúngail Eilni 707–708
- Áed Róin mac Bécce Bairrche 708–735
- Cathussach mac Ailello 735–749
- Bressal mac Áedo Róin 749–750
- Fiachnae mac Áedo Róin 750–789
- Tommaltach mac Indrechtaig 789–790
- Eochaid mac Fiachnai 790–810
- Cairell mac Fiachnai 810–819
- Máel Bressail mac Ailillo 819–825
- Muiredach mac Eochada 825–839
- Matudán mac Muiredaig 839–857
- Lethlobar mac Loingsig 857–873
- Cathalán mac Indrechtaig 857–871
- Ainbíth mac Áedo 873–882
- Eochocán mac Áedo 882–883
- Airemón mac Áedo 882–886
- Fiachnae mac Ainbítha 886–886
- Bécc mac Airemóin 886–893
- Muiredach mac Eochocáin 893–895
- Máel Mocheirge mac Indrechtaig 893–896
- Aitíth mac Laigni 896–898
- Cenn Etig mac Lethlobair 896–900
- Áed mac Eochocáin 898–919
- Dubgall mac Áeda 919–925
- Loingsech mac Cinn Etig 925–932
- Eochaid mac Conaill 932–937
- Matudán mac Áeda 937–950
- Ardgal mac Matudáin 950–970
- Niall mac Áeda 970–971
- Áed mac Loingsig 971–972
- Eochaid mac Ardgail 972–1004
- Gilla Comgaill mac Ardgail 1004–1005
- Máel Ruanaid mac Ardgail 1005–1007
- Matudán mac Domnaill 1007–1007
- Dub Tuinne ("In Torc") mac Eochada 1007–1007
- Domnall mac Duibh Thuinne 1007–1007
- Niall mac Duib Thuinne 1007–1016
- Muiredach mac Matudáin 1007–1008
- Niall mac Eochada 1016–1063
- Eochaid mac Néill meic Eochada ????–1062
- Donnchad Ua Mathgamna 1063–1065
- Cú Ulad Ua Flaithrí 1065–1071
- Lochlainn Ua Máel Ruanaid 1071–1071
- Donn Sléibe mac Eochada 1071–1078
- Áed Meranach Ua hEochada 1078–1080
- Goll na Gorta Ua Mathgamna 1080–1081
- Donn Sléibe mac Eochada 1081–1091
- Donnchad mac Duinn Sléibe 1091–1095
- Eochaid mac Duinn Sléibe 1095–1099
- Donnchad mac Duinn Sléibe 1099–1099
- Eochaid mac Duinn Sléibe 1099–1108
- Donnchad mac Duinn Sléibe 1108–1113
- Áed mac Duinn Sléibe 1113–1127
- Eochaid Ua Mathgamna 1113–1127
- Ragnall Ua hEochada 1127–1131
- Cú Ulad mac Conchobair Chisenaig Mac Duinn Sléibe 1131–1157
- Áed mac Con Ulad Mac Duinn Sléibe 1157–1158
- Eochaid mac Con Ulad Mac Duinn Sléibe 1158–1166
- Magnus mac Con Ulad Mac Duinn Sléibe 1166–1171
- Donn Sléibe mac Con Ulad Mac Duinn Sléibe 1171–1172
- Ruaidrí mac Con Ulad Mac Duinn Sléibe 1172–1201

See List of rulers of Tyrone for the Northern Uí Néill kings of Ulster after the resurrection of the title in 1364.

== See also ==
- List of kings of Ailech
  - List of rulers of Tír Eoghain
  - Kings of Tír Chonaill
- List of kings of Airgíalla
- List of kings of Connacht
- List of kings of Leinster
- List of Kings of Mide
- List of kings of Munster
- List of High Kings of Ireland

== Sources ==
- Stockman, Gerrard (1992). Volume Two, County Down II, The Ards. The Institute of Irish Studies, The Queen's University of Belfast. ISBN 0-85389-450-7.
- MacNeill, Eoin (1919). "The Irish Law of Dynastic Succession: Part II". Studies: An Irish Quarterly Review. 8 (32). Irish Province of the Society of Jesus: 40–653.
- "Annals of the Four Masters", 1990 edition.
- "Annals of Connacht", A. Martin Freeman, 1944.
- "Irish Kings and High Kings", Francis John Byrne, 1973.
- "Leabhar Mor Genealach", Dubhaltach Mac Fhirbhisigh, ed. O'Muralie, 2004.
- Annals of Ulster
