= 9th century in Ireland =

Events from the 9th century in Ireland.

== 800s ==
802

- Death of Muiredach mac Domnaill, King of Mide. He is succeeded by Diarmait mac Donnchado.

803

- Death of Diarmait mac Donnchado, King of Mide. He is succeeded by Conchobar mac Donnchada.

804

- Aed Oirdnide of the Uí Néill is ordained overking of the Uí Néill by the abbot of Armagh.

806

- Viking raid on Iona Abbey in which 68 people, the entire population of the abbey, are massacred.

807

- Construction of the monastery of Kells is begun.
- The Book of Armagh is compiled.
- Vikings raid Roscam and Sligo Abbey.

== 810s ==
812

- Death of Cosgrach mac Flannbhrath, King of Umaill.

815

- Birth of Johannes Scotus Eriugena.

819

- Conchobar mac Donnchada or Conchobar mac Donnchado is High King of Ireland with opposition (rí Érenn co fressabra).

== 820s ==
820

- Feidlimid mac Cremthanin begins his reign as King of Munster, continuing until his death in 847.

822

- Death of Tighearnach mac Cathmogha, King of Uí Fiachrach Aidhne.

== 830s ==
832

- A Viking fleet of about 120 ships under Turgesius invades kingdoms on Ireland's northern and eastern coasts.
- Clondalkin was sacked by Vikings from Denmark and the monastery was burned to the ground.

833

- Death of Conchobar mac Donnchada, King of Mide and High King of Ireland with opposition.

836

- Viking raids penetrate deep inland.

837

- Large Viking fleets appear on the River Boyne and the River Liffey, made up of sixty ships at each location.

838 - 841

- A small Viking fleet enters the River Liffey in eastern Ireland, probably led by the chieftain Saxolb (Soxulfr) who is killed later this year. The Vikings overwinter on Lough Neagh in 840 and set up a base, which the Irish call longphorts and which will eventually become Dublin.

839

- Thorgest (in Latin Turgesius) is the first Viking to attempt creation of an Irish kingdom. He sails up the Shannon and the Bann to Armagh where he forges a realm spanning Ulster, Connacht and Meath.

== 840s ==
840

- Death of Murchad mac Áedo is a King of Connacht from the Uí Briúin branch of the Connachta.

841

- First longphort built at Linn Duachaill (now Annagassan) on the County Louth coast and at the hurdle ford of the River Liffey.
- Abbot of Armagh driven out by Turgesius, Viking leader.

842

- First reported Viking-Irish alliance.
- Máel Sechnaill mac Máele Ruanaid becomes High King of Ireland.

843

- Death of Mael Ruanaid mac Dunnchado, King of Mide since 833.

845

- Forannan, abbot of Armagh, is captured by the Vikings.
- Viking leader Turgesius is captured and killed by Máel Sechnaill, King of Mide.
- Johannes Scotus Eriugena, philosopher and poet moves from Ireland to France and takes over the Palatine Academy at the invitation of Carolingian King Charles the Bald.

846

- Máel Sechnaill becomes overking of the Uí Néill, reigning until his death in 862.

847

- Death of Feidlimid mac Cremthanin, King of Munster, who has reigned since 820.

847 or 848

- Birth of Flann Sinna (d. 916), son of Máel Sechnaill I of Clann Cholmáin, a branch of the southern Uí Néill. He is King of Mide from 877.

848

- Death of Fínsnechta mac Tommaltaig, King of Connacht.
- Viking army defeated by Máel Sechnaill, High King of Ireland, near modern Skreen, County Sligo.
- Viking army defeated by Tigernach mac Fócartai, King of Lagore, somewhere in modern County Sligo
- Viking army defeated by Ólchobar mac Cináeda, King of Munster, and Lorcán mac Cellaig, King of Leinster, near modern Castledermot, County Kildare. The Viking leader Tomrair is killed; he is called jarl and deputy of the king of Laithlind.
- Viking army defeated near Cashel by Ólchobar mac Cináeda.
- Vikings at Cork; besieged by Ólchobar mac Cináeda.
- The Annales Bertiniani report the arrival of Irish envoys at the court of Frankish Emperor Charles the Bald. They bring gifts from the "king of the Irish" and announced an Irish victory over Vikings. The Irish annals record several defeats for Viking armies; which of these is meant is unclear. The identity of the "king of the Irish" is no more certain, but Ólchobar mac Cináeda may be intended rather than Máel Sechnaill.
- Sedulius Scottus arrives at Liège, perhaps having been a member of the embassy to Charles the Bald.

== 850s ==
851

- Máel Sechnaill mac Máele Ruanaid secures the submission of the King of Ulaid.
- Cináed mac Conaing is drowned on the orders of Máel Sechnaill and Tigernach mac Fócartai.

853

- Amlaíb, "son of the king of Laithlind", arrives in Ireland and collects tribute from the Vikings and the Irish.

== 860s ==
860 or 862

- Death of Mael Sechnaill I, overking of the Uí Néill, who has reigned since 846.

864

- Death of Lorcan mac Cathail, King of Mide since 862.

866

- Aed Finliath clears the northern coastline of Viking bases. He defeats the Vikings at Lough Foyle.

== 870s ==
874

- Amlaíb Conung is killed in Scotland on a campaign against Causantín mac Cináeda at about this date.

875

- Oistin mac Amlaíb, Norse King of Dublin, is deceitfully killed, probably by Halfdan Ragnarsson.

877

- Flann Sinna kills Donnchad mac Aedacain and becomes King of Mide.
- Battle of Strangford Lough: In a battle between Dubgaill and Finngaill Vikings at Strangford Lough, Halfdan Ragnarsson, leader of the Great Heathen Army, is killed in an attempt to claim the Kingdom of Dublin from Bárid mac Ímair (who is lamed).

879

- Death of Finshnechta mac Maele Corcrai, King of Luighne Connacht.
- Death of Áed Findliath, High King of Ireland.

== 880s ==
880

- Death of Irish philosopher and poet Johannes Scotus Eriugena in France (877 also commonly given as the date).

882

- Death of Conchobar mac Taidg Mór, King of Connacht from the Uí Briúin branch of the Connachta.

883

- Death of Eochocán mac Áedo, king of Ulaid.

885

- Death of Máel Pátraic, Abbot of Clonmacnoise.

888

- Death of Áed mac Conchobair, King of Connacht.

== 890s ==
895

- Death of Muiredach mac Eochocáin or Muiredach mac Eochucáin, a Dál Fiatach king of Ulaid.

896

- Death of Flann mac Lonáin, poet.
- Death of Sitriuc mac Ímair (Sigtryggr), Viking king (perhaps king of Dublin).
- Death of Murchadh mac Maenach, King of Uí Briúin Seóla
