= Máel Mocheirge mac Indrechtaig =

Máel Mocheirge mac Indrechtaig (died 896) was a Dál Fiatach king of Ulaid, which is now Ulster, Ireland. He belonged to a branch of the Dal Fiatach called the Leth Cathail centered in the Lecale barony of modern County Down and was the brother of Cathalán mac Indrechtaig (died 871), a previous king. He ruled from 893 to 896 as leth-rí (half-king or co-ruler) of Ulaid.

He ruled jointly with Muiredach mac Eochocáin (died 895) of the main Dal Fiatach branch. Muiredach was killed in 895 by Aitíth mac Laigni (died 898) of the Uí Echach Cobo. Máel Mocheirge, himself, was killed by his own associates the next year.

He had a son named Cummascach but no member of the Leth Cathail branch held the kingship of Ulaid after him.
