= Máel Sechnaill mac Máele Ruanaid =

High King of Ireland

Máel Sechnaill I

High King of Ireland
- Reign: 846 - 27 November 862
- Predecessor: Niall Caille
- Successor: Áed Findliath

King of Mide
- Reign: 845 – 27 November 862
- Predecessor: Fland mac Maele Ruanaid
- Successor: Lorcán mac Cathail
- Died: 27 November 862
- Spouse: Land ingen Dúngaile
- Issue: Flann Sinna
- House: Clann Cholmáin
- Father: Máel Ruanaid mac Donnchada Midi

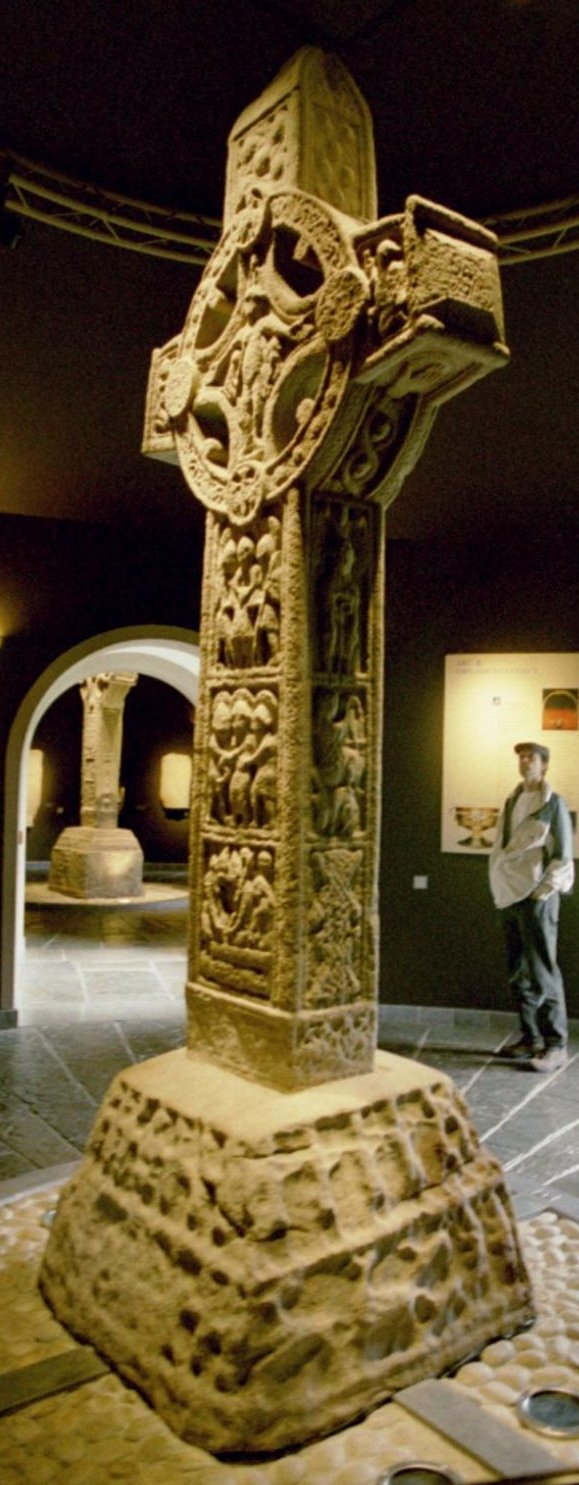
Cross of the Scriptures, Clonmacnoise, commissioned by Máel Sechnaill's son Flann Sinna and erected in 901. Simpler crosses were erected by Máel Sechnaill, including the south cross at Clonmacnoise and those at Kinnitty and Killamery by Kilkenny.

Máel Sechnaill mac Máel Ruanaida (Modern Irish: Maolsheachlann Mac Maolruanaidh), also known as Máel Sechnaill I, anglicised as Malachy MacMulrooney (died 27 November 862) was High King of Ireland. The Annals of Ulster use the Old Irish title rí hÉrenn uile, that is "king of all Ireland", when reporting his death, distinguishing Máel Sechnaill from the usual Kings of Tara who are only called High Kings of Ireland in late sources such as the Annals of the Four Masters or Geoffrey Keating's Foras Feasa ar Éirinn. According to the "Grand History of the Celts", a traditional book of facts and folklore, Mael Sechnaill was the husband of Mael Muire and Land ingen Dúngaile, the granddaughter of the legendary Alpin, a 9th-century king of Dalriada.

== Background ==
Máel Sechnaill was son of Máel Ruanaid and grandson of Donnchad Midi mac Domnaill of Clann Cholmáin, who was King of Tara from around 778 to 797. Clann Cholmáin was a sept of the Uí Néill which ruled as Kings of Mide in east central Ireland. While the southern Uí Néill had been dominated by the Síl nÁedo Sláine Kings of Brega in the 7th and early 8th centuries, the Clann Cholmáin were dominant from the time of Máel Sechnaill's great-grandfather Domnall Midi. The Kingship of Tara, a largely symbolic title, alternated between Clann Cholmáin as representatives of the southern Uí Néill and the Cenél nEógain as representatives of the northern Uí Néill.

Máel Sechnaill became king of Mide and head of Clann Cholmáin after killing his brother Flann in 845, and king of Tara in 846 on the death of Niall Caille mac Áeda of the Cenél nEógain, who drowned in the Callan River close to Armagh. He had appeared in the Irish annals some years earlier, being noticed in 839, and again 841 as a result of fighting among the chiefs of Clann Cholmáin when he killed his cousin Diarmait, son of Conchobar mac Donnchada, when Diarmait had tried to depose Máel Sechnaill's father as king of Mide.

Prior to Máel Sechnaill's coming to power, the southern Uí Néill had been disunited, and until Niall Caille defeated Feidlimid mac Crimthainn, king of Munster, at Mag nÓchtair (County Kildare) in 841, the midlands had been repeatedly ravaged by the Munstermen. At the same time, Ireland was a target for Viking raids, although these appear to have been of minor significance. Niall Caille apparently inflicted a heavy defeat on the Norsemen in 845 at Mag Itha shortly before Máel Sechnaill became king of Mide. Late in 845 the Norse chieftain Thorgest or Turgesius, who had emulated Feidlimid mac Crimthainn by attacking Clonmacnoise and Clonfert, was captured by Máel Sechnaill, and drowned in Lough Owel.

== King of All Ireland ==
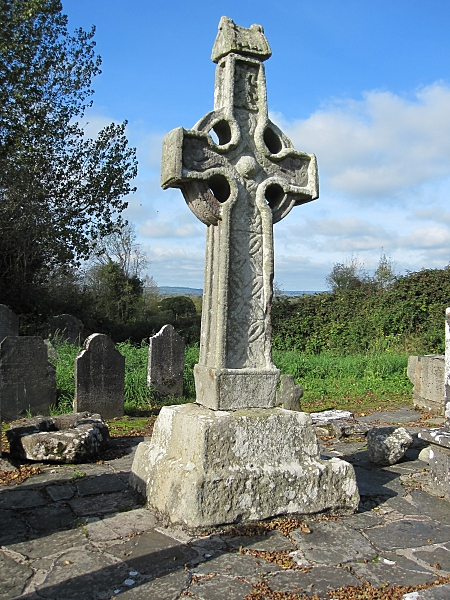
Killamery High Cross, County Kilkenny, bears the inscription OR DO MAELSECHNAILL, "a prayer for Máel Sechnaill", and was erected in the ninth century.

Máel Sechnaill's reign was portrayed in later sources as being frequently a matter of war with the Vikings and Norse-Gaels, thanks largely to works such as the Cogadh Gaedhil re Gallaibh, a panegyric written for Muircheartach Ua Briain, great-grandson of Brian Boru. The annals tell of frequent battles between Máel Sechnaill and the Vikings, both when they were acting on their own and as allies to Cináed mac Conaing or Cerball mac Dúnlainge. But he was also on occasions allied to the Norse-Gaels. In 856 "[g]reat warfare between the heathens [the Norse or Danes] and Máel Sechnaill with the Norse-Irish" is reported by the Annals of Ulster.

Máel Sechnaill's real achievements were in Ulster and Munster. Shortly after killing Cináed with the aid of Tigernach mac Fócartai, Máel Sechnaill met with the king of Ulster, Matudán mac Muiredaig, and the chief cleric of Ulster, Diarmait, Abbot of Armagh. Here Máel Sechnaill was acknowledged as High King by the Ulstermen. This did not end the strife between the Uí Néill and the kings of Ulster as Armagh was raided by Máel Sechnaill in 852. However, Ulster provided troops for Máel Sechnaill, whose army is called "the men of Ireland" in 858.

The annals record expeditions to Munster to obtain tribute and hostages in 854, 856 and in 858, when his army killed several kings, wasted the land and marched south to the sea. Máel Sechnaill's attempts to obtain the submission to the Munster kings of the Eóganachta were obstructed by the ambitious king of Osraige in Leinster, Cerball mac Dúnlainge. Cerball, known to Icelanders' sagas as Kjarvalr Írakonungr, raided Munster and obtained allies and mercenaries from among the Norse and Norse-Gaels of southern Ireland. The Fragmentary Annals of Ireland, a combination of annals and history written in the 11th century for Donnchad mac Gilla Pátraic king of Osraige and Leinster, say that the expedition of 854 was led by Cerball on Máel Sechnaill's orders, although Máel Sechnaill himself appears also to have raided into Munster that year. It is reported that Cerball joined forces with Ivarr, a king of the "Dark foreigners": in 859, they challenged the power of Máel Sechnaill mac Máele Ruanaid. The Annals of Innisfallen are alone in reporting an expedition by Cerball with allies from Munster against Máel Sechnaill in 859, which is said to have reached as far north as Armagh. The Annals of Ulster, however, state that Cerball entered Mide with a great army, supported by Norse allies, Amlaíb and Ivar. A general assembly of kings and clerics in 859 at Rahugh in County Westmeath settled matters by detaching Osraige from Munster. Máel Gualae mac Donngaile of Munster and Cerball both consented to the change which was little loss to the Eóganachta who had rarely exercised any control over Osraige.

Máel Sechnaill's successes raised more opposition from his Uí Néill kinsmen than from subject kings or the Norse and Norse-Gaels, and the latter part of his reign was spent in conflict with the northern Uí Neill, led by Áed Findliath, son of Niall Caille. In 860 Máel Sechnaill led an army raised from Munster, Leinster and Connacht against the northern Uí Néill. The annals say that Áed Findliath and Flann mac Conaing, brother of Cináed, led a night attack on Máel Sechnaill's camp near Armagh which was beaten off with heavy loss to Áed and Flann. Further fighting between Áed and Máel Sechnaill is reported in 861, and again in 862.

Máel Sechnaill died peacefully on 27 November 862. His obituary in the Annals of Ulster states:

Máel Sechnailll son of Máel Ruanaid, son of Donnchad, son of Domnall, son of Murchad of Mide, son of Diarmait the Harsh, son of Airmedach the One-eyed, son of Conall of the Sweet Voice, son of Suibne, son of Colmán the great, son of Diarmait the red, son of Fergus Wrymouth, king of all Ireland, died on the third feria, the second of the Kalends of December, in the 16th year of his reign.

The Fragmentary Annals quote a lament for Máel Sechnaill:

There is much sorrow everywhere;
there is a great misfortune among the Irish.
Red wine has been spilled down the valley;
the only King of Ireland has been slain.

Máel Sechnaill's achievements did not outlast him, and Áed Finnliath was unable to maintain peace within the Uí Néill, nor to receive submission for Munster. Áed's incessant warfare with the Norse and Norse-Gaels, while militarily successful, produced unexpected consequences in the long term for the position of the northern Uí Néill. Power and influence in the 10th and 11th centuries rested increasingly with kings who, like Máel Sechnaill, could exploit the wealth of new trading towns and the forces of the Norse and the Norse-Gaels.

Máel Sechnaill's son Flann Sinna would later be King of Mide, High King of All Ireland.

== Notes ==
Máel Sechnaill mac Máele Ruanaid Clann Cholmáin
Regnal titles
Preceded by Fland mac Maele Ruanaid	King of Mide; 845–862	Succeeded by Lorcán mac Cathail
Preceded by Niall Caille	High King of Ireland; 846–862	Succeeded by Áed Findliath
