= 886 =

Calendar year

886 in various calendars
- Gregorian calendar: 886; DCCCLXXXVI
- Ab urbe condita: 1639
- Armenian calendar: 335; ԹՎ ՅԼԵ
- Assyrian calendar: 5636
- Balinese saka calendar: 807–808
- Bengali calendar: 292–293
- Berber calendar: 1836
- Buddhist calendar: 1430
- Burmese calendar: 248
- Byzantine calendar: 6394–6395
- Chinese calendar: 乙巳年 (Wood Snake); 3583 or 3376 — to — 丙午年 (Fire Horse); 3584 or 3377
- Coptic calendar: 602–603
- Discordian calendar: 2052
- Ethiopian calendar: 878–879
- Hebrew calendar: 4646–4647
- Hindu calendars
- Vikram Samvat: 942–943
- Shaka Samvat: 807–808
- Kali Yuga: 3986–3987
- Holocene calendar: 10886
- Iranian calendar: 264–265
- Islamic calendar: 272–273
- Japanese calendar: Ninna 2 (仁和２年)
- Javanese calendar: 784–785
- Julian calendar: 886; DCCCLXXXVI
- Korean calendar: 3219
- Minguo calendar: 1026 before ROC 民前1026年
- Nanakshahi calendar: −582
- Seleucid era: 1197/1198 AG
- Thai solar calendar: 1428–1429
- Tibetan calendar: ཤིང་མོ་སྦྲུལ་ལོ་ (female Wood-Snake); 1012 or 631 or −141 — to — མེ་ཕོ་རྟ་ལོ་ (male Fire-Horse); 1013 or 632 or −140

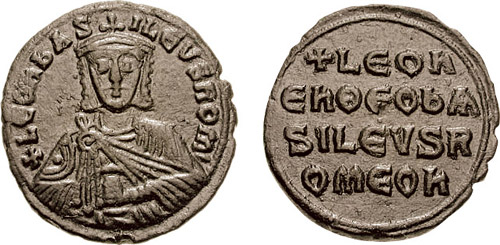
Emperor Leo VI (the Wise) (866–912)

Year 886 (DCCCLXXXVI) was a common year starting on Saturday of the Julian calendar.

== Events ==
=== By place ===
==== Byzantine Empire ====
- March – A wide-ranging conspiracy against Emperor Basil I, led by John Kourkouas, is uncovered.
- August 29 – Emperor Basil I the Macedonian dies from a fever, contracted after a hunting accident. He is succeeded by the 19-year-old Leo VI, officially Basil's son, but reputedly a son of former emperor Michael III, as sole ruler (basileus) of the Byzantine Empire. After his coronation Leo reburies the remains of his reputed father Michael, with great ceremony in the imperial mausoleum, within the Church of the Holy Apostles in Constantinople.

==== Europe ====
- October – Siege of Paris: Count Odo slips through Viking-controlled territory, to ask the king of West Francia Charles the Fat for support. He returns with a relief force, and reaches safety within the walls. Charles arrives later with a large army, and establishes a camp at Montmartre. After negotiations he promises the Vikings tribute (Danegeld) worth 700 Livres (equivalent to 257kg of silver), and allows them to sail up the River Seine, to over-winter in Burgundy.

==== Britain ====
- King Alfred the Great of Wessex recaptures London from the Danish Vikings, and renames it Lundenburh. Slightly upstream from London Bridge, he builds a small harbor called Queenhithe. Alfred hands the town over to his son-in-law Æthelred, lord of Mercia. A street system is planned out in the town, with boundaries of 1,100 yards from east to west, and around 330 yards from north to south.
- King Alfred receives the formal submission of all of the citizens of England not under Viking rule, and adopts the title King of the Anglo-Saxons.

=== By topic ===
==== Religion ====
- December – Emperor Leo VI dismisses Patriarch Photius I, who has been his tutor, and replaces him with his own brother Stephen I.
- The Glagolitic alphabet, devised by Cyril and Methodius, missionaries from Constantinople, is adopted in the Bulgarian Empire.
- Boris I, ruler (khan) of the Bulgarian Empire, establishes the Preslav and Ohrid Literary Schools.

== Births ==
- Ibn Muqlah, Muslim official and vizier (or 885)
- Ōnakatomi no Yorimoto, Japanese poet (approximate date)
- Yang Wo, emperor of Wu (Ten Kingdoms) (d. 908)

== Deaths ==
- March 9 – Abu Ma'shar al-Balkhi, Muslim scholar and astrologer (b. 787)
- August 29 – Basil I, emperor of the Byzantine Empire (b. 811)
- Adalbert I, Frankish margrave (approximate date)
- Airemón mac Áedo, king of Ulaid (Ireland)
- Bernard Plantapilosa, Frankish nobleman (b. 841)
- Deorlaf, bishop of Hereford (approximate date)
- Fiachnae mac Ainbítha, king of Ulaid
- Gao Renhou, Chinese general
- Henry of Franconia, Frankish general
- Heongang, king of Silla (Korea)
- Hugh, archbishop of Cologne
- Joscelin, bishop of Paris
- Li Quanzhong, Chinese warlord
- Li Sigong, Chinese warlord (approximate date)
- Lu Yanhong, Chinese warlord
- Min Xu, governor of the Tang Dynasty
- Muhammad I, Muslim emir of Córdoba (b. 823)
- Robert I, Frankish nobleman
- Wang Xu, Chinese warlord
- Wulgrin I, Frankish nobleman
- Zhuge Shuang, Chinese general
