= Cormac mac Art (disambiguation) =

The name Cormac Mac Art can refer to one of several people, either real, legendary, or fictional:

- Cormac mac Art O Melaghlain - 13th-century Irish king
- Cormac mac Airt - legendary 3rd-century Irish king
- Cormac Mac Art (fictional) - a character in books by Robert E. Howard
