= Grace (style) =

Address of dukes or archbishops

His Grace and Her Grace are English styles of address used with high-ranking personages, and was the style for English monarchs until Henry VIII replaced it with "Majesty", and for Scottish monarchs until the uniting of the Kingdom of Scotland and the Kingdom of England in the Act of Union in 1707.

In Great Britain and Ireland, it is also the style of address for archbishops, dukes, and duchesses; for example, His Grace the Duke of Norfolk and Her Grace the Lord Archbishop of Canterbury. The correct style is "Your Grace" in spoken and written form; as a stylistic descriptor for British dukes, it is an abbreviation of the full, formal style: "The Most High, Noble and Potent Prince His Grace".

However, a royal duke, such as Prince Edward, Duke of Kent, is addressed as Your Royal Highness.

== Ecclesiastical usage ==
=== Christianity ===
The style "His Grace" and "Your Grace" is used in England and some other English-speaking countries to address Catholic archbishops whose seats have come from an English diocesan background, which is not common in other countries (e.g. in France, the Philippines, and the United States Catholic bishops are addressed using the style "Excellency"). In the Eastern Orthodox Church it is used for bishops and abbots. The style is also used for an archbishop and some bishops in the Anglican tradition. In Ireland, the style "His/Your Grace" (Irish: A ghrása) is traditionally used for all Catholic bishops, not just archbishops. In the United Methodist Church in the United States, bishops are addressed "Your Grace" (spoken style), and "His/Her Grace" (reference style). The Church of God in Christ addresses its Presiding Bishop as "His Holy Grace" and "Your Holy Grace". The title solely for Catholic cardinals in reference style is "His Eminence" and the spoken style is "Your Eminence".

"Your Grace" is also an alternative style for the Archbishops of Canterbury and York in the Church of England and the Lord High Commissioner to the General Assembly of the Church of Scotland.

=== Other religions ===
In Islam, several Sufi orders (such as the Qadrianis and Hawariyun) may refer to their spiritual Grand Masters with the honorific "(Most) Gracious ..." or "His Grace" in reference style, while the spoken style is "(Most) Gracious".

International Society for Krishna Consciousness (ISKCON–Hare Krishna) devotees prefix the name of their founder, A. C. Bhaktivedanta Swami Prabhupada, with "His Divine Grace".

== See also ==
- By the Grace of God
- Majesty
- Forms of address in the United Kingdom
- Style of the monarchs of Scotland
