= Donnchad mac Aedacain =

King of Mide
- Reign: 864–877
- Predecessor: Lorcán mac Cathail
- Successor: Flann Sinna
- Died: 877
- House: Clann Cholmáin

Donnchad mac Aedacain (or Donnchad Ua Conchobair) (died 877) was a King of Uisnech and Mide of the Clann Cholmáin. He was the grandson of the High King Conchobar mac Donnchada (died 833). He ruled as King of Mide from 864 to 877.

He came to the throne after the blinding of Lorcán mac Cathail by the high king Áed Findliath (died 879). Donnchad was deceitfully killed by his rival among the Clann Cholmáin, Flann Sinna in 877 who then became king.
