= Congal Cennfota mac Dúnchada =

Congal Cennfota mac Dúnchada (died 674) was a Dal Fiatach king of Ulaid. He was the son of Dúnchad mac Fiachnai (died circa 644), a previous king. He ruled from 670 to 674. His nickname Cennfota means "Long-headed".

The Dal Fiatach dominated the kingship of Ulster from 637 to 674. Family strife was a common theme among the dynasty at this time. In 647 he killed or slew his uncle Máel Cobo mac Fiachnai the king of Ulaid. However Mael Cobhas son Blathmac mac Máele Cobo is mentioned as king of Ulaid before him in the annals so he probably did not acquire the overlordship of Ulaid till after Blathmac's death in 670. Congal suffered the same fate as his uncle when he was slain or killed by his cousin's son Bécc Bairrche mac Blathmaic (died 718) in 674.

Congal had a daughter named Conchenn ingen Congaill who was married first to Fínsnechta Fledach (died 695) of the Síl nÁedo Sláine, high king of Ireland and Congal may have had some support from the Ui Neill. She married secondly Bécc Bairrche.

== See also ==
- Kings of Ulster
