= List of kings of Meath =

Kingdom of Mide (~900 AD)

In medieval Ireland, the kings of Mide were of the Clann Cholmáin, a branch of the Uí Néill. Several were High Kings of Ireland. After the collapse of the kingdom in the 12th century its dynasty, the Ua Mael Sechlainn or Ó Melaghlins, were forced west and settled on the east bank of the Shannon. Bearers of the name were still noted as among the Gaelic nobility until as late as the 1690s, though they had lost any real power long before.

The coat of arms of Meath

The Kingdom of Mide itself seems to have existed as a kingdom (though of varying sizes) since at least the early historic era. Its name means "middle", denoting the fact that it was situated in the very centre of Ireland in what is now County Westmeath, parts of north County Offaly, south County Longford and western County Meath. Its early kings may have been of the Dál Messin Corb - whose sept, the Uí Garrchon, were Kings of Leinster. However, from the late 400's onwards they were driven away from their original homeland in northern Leinster and over the Wicklow Mountains by the Ui Néill, whose sept, the Clann Cholmáin, took their place.

== Early Kings of Mide ==
=== Clann Cholmáin Kings of Mide ===
- Domnall Midi mac Murchado, King (743–763)
- Fallomon mac Con Congalt, King (?–766)
- Donnchad Midi mac Domnaill, King (766–797)
- Domnall mac Donnchada Midi, King (797–799)
- Muiredach mac Domnaill Midi, King (799–802)
- Diarmait mac Donnchado, King (802–803)
- Conchobar mac Donnchado, King (803–833)
- Niall mac Diarmato, King (?–826)
- Máel Ruanaid mac Donnchada Midi (833–843)
- Fland mac Maele Ruanaid, King (843–845)
- Máel Sechnaill mac Maíl Ruanaid, King (845–862)
- Lorcán mac Cathail, King (862–864)
- Conchobar mac Donnchado, King (?–864)
- Donnchad mac Aedacain (864–877)
- Flann Sinna mac Maíl Sechnaill (877–916)
- Conchobar mac Flainn, King (916–919)
- Donnchad Donn mac Flainn, King (919–944)
- Oengus mac Donnchada, King (944–945/946)
- Donnchad mac Domnaill, King (945/946–950)
- Fergal Got mac Oengussa, King (c.950)
- Aed mac Mael Ruanaid, King (c.950–951)
- Domnall mac Donnchada, King (951–952)
- Carlus mac Cuinn, King (952–960)
- Donnchad Finn mac Aeda, King (960–974)
- Muirchertach mac Mael Sechnaill, King (974–c.976)
- Máel Sechnaill mac Domnaill, King (975/976–1022)
- Mael Sechnaill Got mac Mael Sechnaill, King (1022–1025)
- Roen mac Muirchertaig, King (1025–1027)
- Domnall Got, King (1027–1030)
- Conchobar ua Mael Sechlainn, King (1030–1073)
- Murchad mac Flainn Ua Mael Sechlainn, King (1073)
- Mael Sechlainn Ban mac Conchobair Ua Mael Sechlainn, King (1073–1087)
- Domnall mac Flainn Ua Mael Sechlainn, King (1087–1094)
- Donnchad mac Murchada Ua Mael Sechlainn, King (1094–1105)
- Conchobar mac Mael Sechlainn Ua Mael Sechlainn, King (1094–1105)
- Muirchertach mac Domnaill Ua Mael Sechlainn, King (1105–1106)
- Murchad mac Domnaill Ua Mael Sechlainn, King (1106–1153)
- Mael Sechlainn mac Domnaill Ua Mael Sechlainn, King (1115)
- Domnall mac Murchada Ua Mael Sechlainn, King (1127)
- Diarmait mac Domnaill Ua Mael Sechlainn, King (1127–1130, 1155–1156, 1157–1158, 1160–1169)
- Conchobar Ua Conchobair, King (1143–1144)
- Donnchad mac Muirchertaig Ua Mael Sechlainn, King (1144–?)
- Mael Sechlainn mac Murchada Ua Mael Sechlainn, King (1152–1155)
- Donnchad mac Domnaill Ua Mael Sechlainn, King (1155, 1156–1157, 1158–1160)

=== The Lords of Clonlonan ===
- Art mac Mael Sechlainn meic Domnaill Ua Mael Sechlainn, 1173–1184
- Magnus Ua Mael Sechlainn, ????–1175
- Mael Sechlainn Beg, 1184–1213
- Cormac mac Art O Melaghlain, 1213–1239
- Art mac Cormac, 1239–1283
- Cairbre, 1283–1290
- Murchadh mac Cairbre, 1290–93
- Cormac mac Cormac, 1293?–1301
- Cairbre an Sgregain, 1301?–1323
- Art Mór mac Cormac, 1323–1344
- Cormac Ballach mac Art, 1344–62
- Art mac Art Mór, 1362–85
- Conchobhar, 1385?–1401
- Cormac O'Maoileachluinn, 1401-1420?
- ?, fl. 1431.
- Art mac Conn?, died 1431
- Laighnech mac Corc, died 1487
- Conn mac Art mac Conn, 1487–1500
- Murchad mac Conn, died 1518.
- Toirrdelbach the Cleric, 1518–37.
- Art mac Conn, 1537–39
- Felim Óg mac Felim mac Conn, 1539–42
- Rudhraighe, 1542–43; died 1544
- Caedach mac Felim mac Conn, 1543–?
- Conn mac Art mac Conn, ?–1548
- Tadhg Ruadh mac Toirrdelbach, 1548–53?
- Murchad mac Toirrdelbach?, fl. 1547/49?
- An Calbhach, 1564–c. December 1600.
- Irriel, December 1600 – 10 April 1604.
- Phelim mac Irriel, born 1 August 1602, alive 1604.

== See also ==
- Irish kings
- Irish royal families
- Kings of Brega
- List of High Kings of Ireland
- List of kings of Ulster
- List of kings of Leinster
- List of kings of Connacht
- List of kings of Munster
