= Fiachnae mac Demmáin =

Fiachnae mac Demmáin (died 627) was King of Ulaid from 626 to 627. He sometimes was called Fiachnae Dubtuinne. He was a member of the Dal Fiatach and nephew of Baetan mac Cairill (died 581) of Ulaid. He was the son of Demmán mac Cairell (died 572). He succeeded his uncle as king of the Dal Fiatach in 581.

His first mention in the Irish annals is the battle of Cúl Caíl (possibly Kilkeel, modern County Down) in 601, where he was defeated by Fiachnae mac Baetain of the Dal nAraide. The annals say Fiachnae mac Baetan went against him, so was probably the aggressor. This was part of the struggle of these two rival clans for the overlordship of Ulaid. In 626, the Battle of Leithit Midind was fought at Drung (Knocklayd, modern County Antrim) between these two rivals; Fiachnae mac Demmáin was the victor, and Fiachnae mac Baetan was slain. The annals say the battle was fought by him, implying he was the aggressor.

He now becomes King of Ulaid but was himself defeated and slain by the King of Dalriada, Connad Cerr at the Battle of Ard Corainn in 627. The Annals of Clonmacnoise claim that this was in revenge for the slaying of Fiachnae mac Baetan.

He had two wives: Cumne Dub was the daughter of Furudrán mac Béicce of the Uí Tuirtri. She was the mother of Dúnchad mac Fiachnai (died circa 644), a king of Ulaid and of a daughter Dub Lacha who married Mongán mac Fiachnai (died 625), the son of his rival Fiachnae mac Baetan.

Cumne (Cummíne) Find was the daughter of Báetán Cáech of DalnAraide and sister of Fiachnae mac Baetan. She was the mother of Máel Cobo mac Fiachnae (died 647), a king of Ulaid and a son named Suibne.

He was ancestor of all later Dal Fiatach kings.

== See also ==
- Kings of Ulster
