= Fiachnae mac Ainbítha =

Fiachnae mac Ainbítha (died 886) or Fiachna mac Ainfítha was a Dál Fiatach king of Ulaid, which is now Ulster, Ireland. He was the son of Ainbíth mac Áedo (died 882), a previous king of Ulaid. He ruled briefly in 886.

In 883 he was responsible for the killing of his uncle Eochocán mac Áedo, leth-rí (half-king or co-ruler) of Ulaid jointly with his other uncle, Airemón mac Áedo (died 886). Fiachnae succeeded Airemón as sole king in 886 but was promptly killed by his own associates.
