= Niall mac Áeda =

Niall mac Áeda may refer to:

- Niall Caille (died 846), King of Ailech and High King of Ireland
- Niall Glúndub (died 917), his grandson, also King of Ailech and High King of Ireland
