= Fergnae mac Oengusso Ibdaig =

Fergnae mac Óengusso Ibdaig (died 557) was a Dal Fiatach king of Ulaid. He was the nephew of Muiredach Muinderg mac Forgo (died 489) and grandson of Forga mac Dallán, previous kings.

He ruled the Dal Fiatach from 532 and succeeded Eochaid mac Condlai of the Dal nAraide as king of Ulaid in 552. He ruled from 552 to 556.

He was slain at the Battle of Druim Cleithe (Kilclief, County Down) by his cousin Demmán mac Cairill (died 572) who had support of the Uí Echach nÁrda, another branch of the Dal Fiatach. As a result of this battle, his branch of the Dal Fiatach known as the Ui Ibdaig were excluded from the throne.

The naming of the Uí Ibdaig is variously interpreted. Some propose that it was named for Fergnae's father's mother, while others suggest that Ibdaig is an epithet—the Hebridean—applied to his father, who should be identified with the eponymous ancestor of the Cenél nÓengusa of Islay. The toponym Ibdaig has also been identified as the pre-Norse toponym for Uist.
