= Cormac mac Art Ó Melaghlain =

- King of Mide
- Reign: 1205–1239
- Predecessor: Maelsechlainn Beag Ó Melaghlain
- Successor: Diarmait Ruadh Ó Melaghlin
- Died: 1239
- Father: Art mac Mael Sechlainn Ó Melaghlin
- Mother: ?

Cormac mac Art Ó Melaghlain, was King of Mide from around 1209/10 to 1239. He managed to win several notable victories over the Anglo-Normans and as a result was one of the more prominent and successful later Kings of Mide. Whatever gains Cormac made were not to prove long lasting however, even in his own reign, and the successor lords of Clann Cholmain were largely insignificant to the politics of later medieval Ireland.

== Background ==
Cormac's family had been rulers of the Kingdom of Mide since at least the early 6th century. Known as the Clann Cholmáin, they were a branch of the southern Uí Néill dynasty. They had taken the surname Ua Mael Sechlainn after their prestigious ancestor, Máel Sechnaill mac Maíl Ruanaid, who reigned as High King of Ireland from 845 to 860. One of his descendants, and another of Cormac's ancestors, was Máel Sechnaill mac Domnaill (known as Máel Sechnaill II) who was High King before and after the reign of Brian Boru. Following the reign of Máel Sechnaill mac Domnaill from 976 to 1022, the Kingdom of Mide was quickly reduced to a fraction of its former power.

Despite, or perhaps because of, its situation in central Ireland, Mide found itself being used as a pawn in the power-struggles of the newly-dominant kingdoms, as real power on the island shifted to the previously marginalized dynasties of Leinster, Munster and Connacht as well as their northern Uí Néill kinsmen. Its past sponsorship of large numbers of monasteries ate into the kingdoms resources and its failure to secure over-lordship of Dublin, the islands economic capital, meant they would never again produce a High King of Ireland.

== Life and reign ==
Nothing is known of Cormac's early life other than it took place largely during the reign of his father Art mac Mael Sechlainn who took the throne in 1173 by killing his step-brother, the previous king Donnchad Ua Mael Sechlainn. Cormac's father was killed in 1184 by a son of Domnall Mór Ua Briain King of Thomond at a meeting between the two kings, according to the Annals of the Four Masters, at the instigation of the English. He was succeeded in the same year by Maelsechlainn Beag Ó Melaghlain, who three days later defeated Domnall in battle and razed an English castle slaughtering its garrison. In 1202 the annals record the death of another of Cormac's brothers Dermot.

The first mention of Cormac appears in 1209/10 when he slew Art Ó Ruairc King of Breifne. In 1211 he defeated the English at Delvin and killed its constable Robert of Duncomar. In the next year he defeated John de Gray Chief Governor of Ireland and took from him large spoils, later at the battle of the 'Wood of the High Trees' he defeated another English force killing a 'great multitude'. This battle was notable enough to be recorded by the Annals of Ulster who are otherwise mainly silent on the affairs of Clann Cholmain from the 12th century on. Cormac himself was defeated after this victory by Donnell son of Maelsechlainn Beag in an apparent dynastic civil war. Donnell was shortly afterwards killed himself and Cormac marched on Maelsechlainn Beag's lands forcing him into exile and burning the castle at Birr. He also plundered the English castle of Kilclare for horses and other loot prompting an expedition against him where he was defeated at the battle of Tine Bridge in 1213 and forced to relinquish his newly acquired land.

After this defeat Cormac is scarcely mentioned in the annals. He was captured in 1227 but by who and why is unknown. It is possible he aided the King of Connacht Felim O'Connor in 1236 in his effort to reclaim his throne. In 1239 Cormac died and was succeeded by his son Art mac Cormac Ó Melaghlain. Art would go on to have a relatively successful reign for a later King of Mide also, defeating the English of Meath in 1264 reasserting control over lands his father had lost after the battle of Tine Bridge and gaining the submission of many local chieftains. Two years later his people fended off an attack by the de Burgh's of Connacht. Another possible descendant of Cormac's is Cairpre Ó Melaghlain King of Mide after Art, who managed to defeat an alliance of the Anglo-Normans of Meath and Magnus O'Connor King of Connacht in 1289.

== See also ==
- Kings of Mide
- Kingdom of Mide
- Ui Neill
- Clann Cholmain
