= Blathmac mac Máele Cobo =

Blathmac mac Máele Cobo (died 670) was a Dál Fiatach ruler of the over-kingdom of Ulaid. He was the son of Máel Cobo mac Fiachnai (died 647). He ruled from 647 to 670.

== Background ==
The Dál Fiatach dominated the kingship of Ulster from 637 to 674. Family strife was a common theme among the dynasty at this time. His father was slain or killed by Blathmac's cousin Congal Cennfota mac Dúnchada in 647. The Irish annals mention Blathmac's death as king prior to Congal's with that title so it can be assumed that Blathmac acquired the title despite Congal's killing of his father.

In 668 the Battle of Fertas (near Belfast) was fought between the Ulaid and the Cruithne. Here, Cathussach mac Luirgéne, their king, was defeated and slain.

Blathmac had seven sons including Bécc Bairrche mac Blathmaic, a king of Ulaid.

== See also ==
- Kings of Ulster
