= Airemón mac Áedo =

Airemón mac Áedo (died 886) (also Éiremón) was a Dál Fiatach king of Ulaid, which is now Ulster, Ireland. He was the grandson of Eochaid mac Fiachnai (died 810), a previous king of Ulaid. He ruled from 882 to 886.

In 882 he succeeded his brother Ainbíth mac Áedo as leth-rí (half-king or co-ruler) of Ulaid jointly with his other brother, Eochocán mac Áedo (died 883). However, the next year in 883, Eochocán was killed by his nephews, the sons of Ainbíth, leaving Airemón as sole king. Airemón was himself killed in 886 by the Norseman, Eolóir son of Iergne (Halldór, son of Járn-kné)

His sons included Bécc mac Airemóin (died 893), a King of Ulaid and Máel Mórda who was slain at the Battle of Grellach Eilte in 914 fighting in the forces of Niall Glúndub (died 919) of the northern Ui Neill versus the high king Flann Sinna (died 916).
