= Eochaid mac Muiredaig Muinderg =

Eachaid mac Muiredaig Muinderg (died 509) was a king of Ulaid from the Dál Fiatach. He was the son of Muiredach Muinderg mac Forggo (died 489). His death date is given in the Annals of Tigernach in 509. This annal gives him a reign of 489–509.

In the period following the destruction of Emain Macha after 450, Ulidia underwent a recuperation in which the Dal Fiatach emerge as the overlords with his father Muiredach as the first historical king. The early seat of power of this dynasty appears to have been in County Louth at Ochtar Cuillche (Colland) at Collon, south of Ardee, County Louth and his descendants are said to have divided their inheritance here in the early 6th century. In 496/498 the annals record the storming of Dún Lethglaise (Downpatrick, modern County Down) which may be connected with the rise of Dal Fiatach in this area which was to become their power base.

The Tripartite Life of St. Patrick has a story that Saint Patrick cursed the descendants of Eachaid and gave his blessing to the descendants of his brother Cairell mac Muiredaig Muinderg (died 532). This was due to Eachaid ordering two virgins who wanted to serve God to be drowned. Eachaid's pregnant wife threw herself at Patrick's feet and received baptism in order to spare the curse on her unborn son. Cairell's descendants did monopolize the kingship.
