= Bécc Bairrche mac Blathmaic =

Bécc Bairrche mac Blathmaic (died 718) was king of Ulaid from 692 to 707 from the Dál Fiatach clan. He was the son of Blathmac mac Máel Cobha (died 670), a previous king. His byname Bairrche refers to the region of the Mourne Mountains in south County Down. Bynames like his can refer to a region or to fosterage and there may be a connection to the Uí Bairrche of Leinster in his byname.

== Background ==
The Dál Fiatach had dominated the kingship of Ulster from 637 to 674. Family strife was a common theme among the dynasty at this time. The grandfather of Bécc, Máel Cobo mac Fiachnai had been slain by his nephew, Congal Cennfhatar mac Dúnchada in 647. In 674 Congal, now King of Ulaid, was himself slain by Bécc who thereby acquired the rule of the Dál Fiatach.

He, however, did not acquire the Ulaid throne until after the death of Fergus mac Áedáin of the rival Uí Echach Cobo branch of the Dal nAraide in 692 who may have been a compromise candidate.

The High King of Ireland Fínsnechta Fledach of the Síl nÁedo Sláine may have been married to the daughter of Congal named Conchenn and may have had some personal antagonism towards Bécc. The offensive was struck by Bécc who penetrated into southern Ui Neill territory only to be defeated by the high king at Tailltin in 679.

Bécc was also married to Conchenn ingen Congaile probably after the death of Fínsnechta in order to bolster his position in Ulaid. He also married Barrdub, daughter of Lethlobar mac Echach (died 709) of the Dal nAraide.

He acquired the throne of Ulaid in 692 and as ruler of such was one of the guarantors of the Cáin Adomnáin (Law of Adomnán) at Birr in 697.

In 691 the Dál Riata despoiled the Cruithin (Dal nAraide) and the Ulaid (Dál Fiatach). British marauders were active around the turn of the 8th century. In 697 The Ulaids and the Britons laid waste to Mag Muirtheimne in County Louth, home of a border tribe of Ulidia known as the Conaille Muirtheimne. In 703 the Britons and Ulaid were at war with each other and the Battle of Mag Cuilind was fought in the Ards Peninsula. The British enemy, the son of Radgann (known for despoiling churches) was slain.

He abdicated and took up the pilgrim's staff in 707 and died in 718.

His son by Conchenn ingen Congaile, Áed Róin (died 735) was also a King of Ulaid.
