= Tigernach mac Fócartai =

Tigernach mac Fócartai (died 865), also called Tigernach of Lagore, was King of Lagore.

== Background ==
Tigernach belonged to the Uí Chernaig branch of the once-powerful Síl nÁedo Sláine kindred, part of the southern Uí Néill. His great-great-grandfather Fogartach mac Néill had been High King of Ireland. The kingdom of Brega over which the Síl nÁedo Sláine had once ruled was, by the middle of the eighth century, divided into two or more parts. The Uí Chernaig were styled kings of Lagore, or of south Brega, named after Loch Gabhair in modern County Meath. Archaeological study of the crannog in Loch Gabhair suggests that the seat of the kings of Lagore was there. The Hill of Tara lay within the kingdom of Lagore, and this may have given the otherwise minor kingdom a somewhat greater importance.

== Biography ==
During Tigernach's reign the Irish midlands were dominated by his distant Uí Néill kinsman, the High King Máel Sechnaill mac Máele Ruanaid of Clann Cholmáin. The earliest record of Tigernach may be his defeat of Máel Sechnaill and the King of Leinster Ruarc mac Brain in 846.

In 848, probably as part of a broad alliance of Irish kings, Tigernach gained a victory over Vikings at Dísert Do-Chonna, an unidentified location, probably near the coast in the east midlands of Ireland. Vikings, however, were not the main threat to Tigernach. That came from his kinsmen in north Brega, the ambitious Cináed mac Conaing and his brother Flann.

Cináed, who became king of north Brega in 849, allied with Vikings in 850 and, according to the Annals of Ulster, "plundered the Uí Néill from the Shannon to the sea". He attacked the crannog at Loch Gabair, which was burned, as was the nearby church at Trevet with seventy people inside. The Annals of Ulster record Tigernach's revenge. Cináed met with Máel Sechnaill and Tigernach the following year where, in spite of promises of safe conduct guaranteed by the church, he was betrayed and "cruelly drowned in a pool by Máel Sechnaill and Tigernach".

The Irish annals record a battle between Flann and Tigernach in 854, at Domnach Mór (Donaghmore in modern County Laois) where Flann had the best of it. Nothing further is reported of Tigernach until his death in 865. His obituary calls Tigernach king of Lagore (rí Locha Gabor) and co-king of Brega (lethrí Breg).

== Descendants ==
The Ó Tighearnaigh/Tierney family of County Meath are descents from the Tigernach.
