= Matudán mac Muiredaig =

Matudán mac Muiredaig (died 857) was a Dál Fiatach king of Ulaid, which is now Ulster, Ireland. He was the son of Muiredach mac Eochada (died 839), the previous king. He ruled from 839 to 857.

== Life ==
His father had been killed by his own brother Áed. However, Matudán killed his uncle and was able to acquire the throne.

Vikings were on Lough Neagh in 839 and wintered there in 840–841 in the opening years raiding the various parts of the north including the Ulaid territories. In 852 the Norse fought a fierce naval battle with newcomers, the Danes, in Carlingford Lough but were heavily defeated. Matudán may have given land support to the Norse forces in this battle.

In 851 Matudán met with the high king Máel Sechnaill mac Máele Ruanaid (died 863) of the southern Uí Néill in Armagh. In a meeting presided over by the clerics of Armagh and Mide, Matudán formally acknowledged the authority of the high king. This led in 855 to an attack by Áed Findliath, King of Ailech, of the northern Ui Neill. However his foray failed and he left behind slain kin. Áed Findliath had as one of his wives the sister of Matudán- Gormlaith Rapach "the harsh".

The annals record a possible co-ruler (leth-rí -"half king") Cathmal mac Tommaltaig of the Leth Cathail branch of the Dál Fiatach (in Lecale, modern County Down) who is not recorded in the king lists. Cathmal was slain by the Norse in 853.

Matudán died in 857 and according to the Fragmentary Annals he took clerical orders prior to his death. His descendants (if any) did not hold the throne of Ulaid which descended through the line of his uncle Áed.
