= River Tall =

River in Northern Ireland

Coordinates: 54.43456°N 6.61909°W

The River Tall is a small river in County Armagh, Northern Ireland which joins the River Blackwater just south of Verner’s Bridge. It is navigable for 4 km by dinghy or canoe.

It rises about 5 km west of Markethill and flows north by Richhill and Ballyhegan, and then turns west.

Originally it flowed into the River Callan at Fairlawn Bridge, but was diverted into a cut excavated in 1851–4, which intercepts it at a point 2 km above the former confluence and conveys it directly to the Blackwater just above Verner's Bridge. The "Old Course of the Tall", from the interception down to Fairlawn Bridge, is so named on maps of the time, but it is unnamed on more recent OSNI maps, and may have been partially filled in.

A second cut, completed in 1855, partly diverted the Callan, by means of a weir at Clonmain Mill near the junction of the Summerisland Road and the Cloveneden Road, to the Tall at a point 0.3 km above the latter's own diversion, but the bulk of the Callan has continued in its original course. Both cuts are labelled "Callan River (New Course)" on maps of the time, but are unnamed on more recent OSNI maps.

In common usage, the name "Tall River" is now extended to include the first cut, all the way from the interception down to the Blackwater, but OSNI maps attach the name only to the part upstream from the interception. The first cut is also known locally as "the canal".

For a map of the drainage, see here.

== See also ==
- List of rivers of Ireland

== Bibliography ==
- CPW-I, Commissioners of Public Works (Ireland) (1853). "Twentieth report 1852-1853". HMSO (Enhanced parliamentary papers on Ireland).
- OSNI, Ordnance Survey of Northern Ireland. "Historical maps". viewed on PRONI Mapping Application. The historical editions can be selected from the "Layer List" menu in the PRONI viewer.
- Savage, Michael B (2003). River Bann and Lough Neagh Pilot. River Bann and Lough Neagh Association.
