= River Blackwater (Northern Ireland) =

River in Counties Armagh and Tyrone, Northern Ireland, and County Monaghan, Ireland

Coordinates: 54.51132°N 6.57832°W

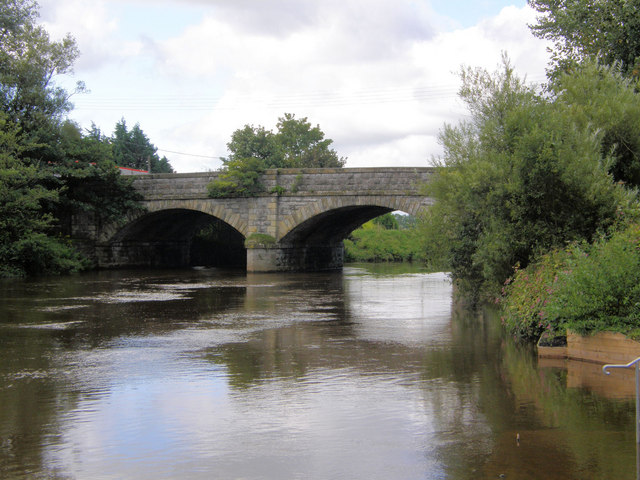
- Charlemont Bridge over the River Blackwater, connecting Charlemont in County Armagh to The Moy in County Tyrone.
- Native name: Cluain-Dabhail (Irish); An Abhainn Mhór (Irish)

Location
- Country: Northern Ireland, (UK)

Physical characteristics
- Source
  - location: north of Augher, County Tyrone
  - elevation: 59 metres (194 ft)
- Mouth
  - location: Lough Neagh
- Length: 91.3 km (56.7 mi)
- Basin size: 1,507 km^{2} (582 sq mi)
- Discharge
  - average: 19.7 m^{3}/s (700 cu ft/s)

Basin features
- Tributaries
  - right: Cor River, Callan River, River Tall

The River Blackwater (Irish: An Abhainn Mhór) or Ulster Blackwater is a river mainly in County Armagh and County Tyrone, Northern Ireland. Its source is to the north of Fivemiletown, County Tyrone. The river divides County Armagh from County Tyrone and also divides County Tyrone from County Monaghan, making it part of the border between the United Kingdom and the Republic of Ireland.

== Route ==
The Blackwater's length is 91.3 km (56.75 mi). If the Blackwater's flow is measured through its path through the 30 km (19 mi) Lough Neagh and onwards to the sea via the 64.4 km (40 mi) Lower Bann, the total length is 186.3 km (115.75 mi). This makes the Blackwater–Neagh–Bann the longest natural stream flow in Ulster and is longer than the Munster Blackwater.

== Names ==
The River Blackwater was originally known in Irish as Cluain-Dabhail meaning "meadow of Dabhal". This was anglicised as Clanaul, the former name of the parish of Eglish, as well as Glenaul, which was used as the name of the former local district electoral division of Armagh Union. It has also been known as An Abhainn Mhór (The Great River). Part of the rivers course forms the border between Counties Tyrone and Monaghan.

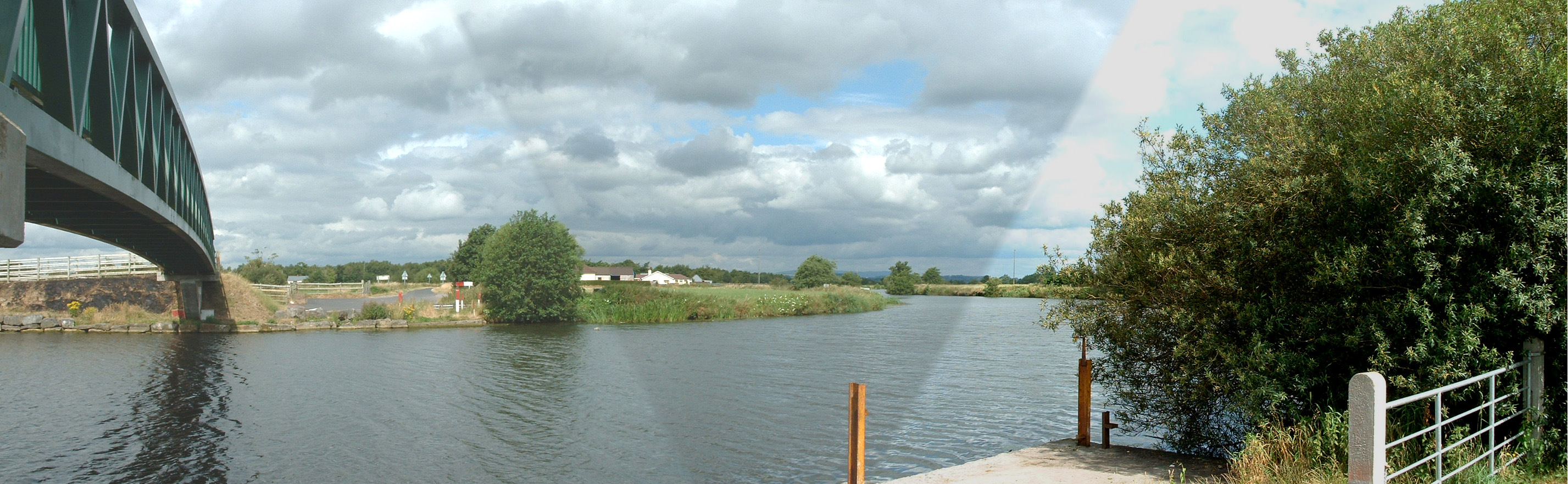
Panoramic view of the River Blackwater, with Maghery bridge, County Armagh. On the far side of the river is Derrylaughan, County Tyrone

== Inland navigation history ==
The inland waterways network of Ireland had developed in the later part of the eighteenth century, and in 1814, the Directors General of Inland Navigation were keen to join the various parts together. This required a link between Lough Neagh and Lough Erne, and another between Lough Erne and the River Shannon. Accordingly, they asked John Killaly, their engineer, to look at the first of these routes, "in general terms". Although the Directors did not proceed immediately, due to lack of funds, the scheme was revived in 1822 and the canal was eventually completed in 1841. Below the first lock at Charlemont, the canal joined the river, and used the river channel to reach Lough Neagh. The venture was not a success, as significant volumes of traffic failed to develop, and the canal was taken over by the Board of Works in 1851.

Meanwhile, the Office of Public Works (The OPW, often known as 'the Board of Works') had obtained powers in the Drainage (Ireland) Act 1842 (5 & 6 Vict. c. 89) to carry out various projects around the Lough Neagh basin, with the intent of improving drainage, navigation and mill-power. Following a survey by their engineer, John McMahon, a scheme was developed to make the Lower Bann navigable from Lough Neagh to the sea. This involved removing a great shoal of rock at Portna which had the effect of lowering the level of Lough Neagh by around 6 feet (1.8 m). This had a significant effect on the Blackwater, and major work was required on the river to keep it navigable. The Maghery Cut, which gave access to Lough Neagh to the south of Derrywarragh Island, had to be made deeper and wider, and the channel of the river was dredged, to maintain a navigable depth. The final lock on the Coalisland Canal and the Ulster Canal had to be reconstructed with a lower sill and deeper gates, to accommodate the lower level of the river, as did the final lock on the Newry Canal where it joined the Upper Bann.

The total cost of the project, split between navigation and drainage work, was estimated at £183,775. The cost of work on the Blackwater exceeded that on any of the other inflows to Lough Neagh. While the first 5 miles (8 km) of the river above the lough was large and wide, considerable work was needed between there and Blackwatertown to eradicate sharp bends and shoals. New sections of river channel were cut, and were made between 80 and 90 feet (24 and 27 m) wide, with their depth sufficient to provide 6 feet (1.8 m) of water when Lough Neagh was at it lowest designed level during the summer months. Excavated material was used to backfill the old river channels, so that loss of land was reduced. To protect the surrounding low-lying land from flooding by the river, the channel was embanked. The embankments were designed with self-acting sluices, to allow watercourses to pass through them when water levels were suitable. After some of the embankments had been finished, local landowners petitioned against their completion, as they felt that the lower level of Lough Neagh and the works already carried out gave them sufficient protection, and it was inadvisable to completely protect the land. The work on defences was thus deferred.

The original plans were to embank the Tall River and the Callan River, which joined to the south of Clonmain and flowed into the Blackwater below Charlemont bridge. This aspect of the project was reworked, and a new straight cut was made from a point on the Tall River to the north of Clonmain, crossing Sir William Verner's bog, and rejoining the Blackwater just above Verner's Bridge, some 5 miles (8 km) below the original confluence. This had the advantage that under flood conditions, the water level in the Blackwater was from 4 to 5 feet (1.2 to 1.5 m) lower than that further upstream. The channel below Verner's Bridge was also considerably wider, and so could better cope with the volumes of water discharged by the two tributaries.

The project took eleven years to complete, by which time costs had overrun by £50,000. The government were approached to make up the shortfall, and did so. When the scheme began, there was to be a single controlling authority to maintain the works, with the more profitable Lower Bann helping to fund the less profitable Blackwater and Upper Bann. However, by the time it was completed, three separate and independent trusts were set up. The Upper Bann and the Blackwater were managed by the Upper Bann Navigation Trust. The counties to the south of Lough Neagh were expected to fund their part of the drainage and navigation works, and to contribute £800 per year towards the running of the Trust, with no income to meet this figure. The Lower Bann Navigation Trust and the Lough Neagh Drainage Trust were wound up in 1929, with their responsibilities passing to the Ministry of Finance, but despite vigorous campaigning by the counties supporting the Upper Bann Navigation Trust, the government refused to disband it, and it continued to be funded until 1954, when the Ministry of Commerce took over the waterways and effectively closed them.

== See also ==
- List of rivers of Ireland

== Bibliography ==
- CPW-I, Commissioners of Public Works (Ireland) (1853). "Twentieth report 1852-1853". HMSO (Enhanced parliamentary papers on Ireland).
- Cumberlidge, Jane (2002). The Inland Waterways of Ireland. Imray Laurie Norie and Wilson. ISBN 978-0-85288-424-9.
- Delany, Ruth (2004). Ireland's Inland Waterways. Appletree Press. ISBN 978-0-86281-824-1.
