= Máel Cobo mac Fiachnai =

Máel Cobo mac Fiachnai (died 647) was a Dal Fiatach king of Ulaid. He was the son of Fiachnae mac Demmáin (died 627) and half-brother of Dúnchad mac Fiachnai (died c. 644), previous kings. He ruled from c. 644 to 647.

The Dal Fiatach recovered the overlordship of Ulaid after the death of Congal Cáech at the Battle of Mag Roth in 637 and were to retain it until 674. Family strife was a common theme among the dynasty at this time. Máel Cobo was himself killed or slain by his nephew Congal Cennfota mac Dúnchada (died 674) in 647.

His sons were Blathmac mac Máele Cobo (died 670), a king of Ulaid and Óengus whose grandson Cathal mac Muiredaig was ancestor of the Leth Cathail sept of the Dal Fiatach.

== See also ==
- Kings of Ulster
