= Demmán mac Cairell =

Demmán mac Cairill (died 572) was a king of the Dál Fiatach, and over-king of Ulaid in Ireland. He was the son of Cairell mac Muiredaig Muinderg (died 532), a previous Ulaid king and brother of Báetán mac Cairill (died 581). He ruled the Dál Fiatach and Ulaid from 557 to 572.

== Background ==
According to the genealogies, he was fostered by a certain Domangart mac Predae, possibly Domangart Réti, King of Dál Riata. He acquired the kingship of Ulaid by defeating and slaying Fergnae mac Oengusso Ibdaig at the Battle of Druim Cleithe (Kilclief, modern County Down, Northern Ireland) and had the support of the Uí Echach Arda. He himself was slain by the shepherds of Boirenn.

He was married to Garbae ingine Néilléne of the Cenél nEógain. He had five sons including Fiachnae mac Demmáin (died 627), a later king of Ulaid. His descendants the Clan Demmáin went on to monopolize the kingship of the Dál Fiatach. His fort, Ráth Deamáin, stood just west of Crossgar in what is now the townland of Rademan in the parish of Kilmore, County Down, Northern Ireland.

== See also ==
- Dál Fiatach
- Kings of Ulster
- Ulaid
