= Máel Pátraic =

Abbot of Clonmacnoise

Mael Patraic (died 885) was Abbot of Clonmacnoise.

Mael Patraic was of the Uí Mháine.
