= Máel Ruanaid mac Donnchada Midi =

Máel Ruanaid mac Donnchada Midi (died 843) was a King of Uisnech in Mide of the Clann Cholmáin. He was the son of the High King of Ireland, Donnchad Midi (died 797) and half brother of the high king Conchobar mac Donnchada (died 833). He ruled in Uisnech from 833-843.

He succeeded his brother as King of Uisnech in 833, but did not succeed to the high kingship, which rotated amongst the Clann Cholmain, and the Cenél nÉogain of the Northern Ui Neill at this time. Niall Caille became high king as representative of the northern branch.

Niall Caille, to ensure his authority, raids Meath in the year 835. Meath was also caught up in the war between Niall Caille and Feidlimid mac Crimthainn, the King of Munster. Feidlimid raided Meath and Brega in an advance on Tara in 840, where he was halted by Niall.

In 841 Máel Ruanaid was defeated by his nephew Diarmait mac Conchobair, and was temporarily ousted from the throne, but his son Máel Sechnaill mac Maíl Ruanaid (died 862) killed Diarmait on the same day — thereby saving his father and his throne. His sons included Flann mac Máele Ruanaid (died 845), who was King of Mide, and Máel Sechnaill, who became High King in 846.
