= Dúnchad mac Fiachnai =

Dúnchad mac Fiachnai (died c. 644) was King of Ulaid from the Dal Fiatach dynasty. He was the son of Fiachnae mac Demmáin (died 627), a previous king. He ruled from 637 – c.644.

The Dal Fiatach recovered the kingship of Ulaid after the Battle of Mag Roth in 637 and were to retain it until 674. Family strife was a common theme within the dynasty at this time. Dúnchad's mother was Cumne Dub ingen Furudráin of the Uí Tuirtri (a tribe of the Airgialla west of Lough Neagh in modern County Tyrone). She had previously been married to Dúnchad's great uncle Baetan mac Cairill (died 581) by whom she had children. These children were eliminated by Dúnchad's full brother Máel Dúin mac Fiachnai in 605. However, the ambitions of Máel Dúin were not to be fulfilled as he was murdered by Dúnchad at Óenach Deiscirt Maige, probably in southern Muirthemne in modern County Louth.

His son Congal Cennfota mac Dúnchada (died 674) was also a King of Ulaid.
