= Bécc mac Airemóin =

Bécc mac Airemóin (died 893) or Bécc mac Éiremóin was a Dál Fiatach king of Ulaid, which is now Ulster, Ireland. He was the son of Airemón mac Áedo (died 886), a previous king of Ulaid. He ruled from 886 to 893.

He became king of Ulaid upon the assassination of his cousin, Fiachnae mac Ainbítha in 886. He was slain in 893 by Aitíth mac Laigni (died 898) of the Uí Echach Cobo.
