= Muiredach mac Eochocáin =

Muiredach mac Eochocáin (died 895) or Muiredach mac Eochucáin was a Dál Fiatach king of Ulaid, which is now Ulster, Ireland. He was the son of Eochocán mac Áedo (died 883), a previous king of Ulaid. He ruled as leth-rí (half-king or co-ruler) of Ulaid from 893-895

He may have ruled jointly with Máel Mocheirge mac Indrechtaig (died 896) of the Leth Cathail (Lecale) branch of the Dal Fiatach. His cousin and predecessor Bécc mac Airemóin had been slain by Aitíth mac Laigni (died 898) of the Uí Echach Cobo in 893. Muiredach was also killed by Aitíth in 895.
