= Báetán mac Cairill =

Báetán mac Cairill (died 581) was king of the Dál Fiatach, and high-king of Ulaid, from c. 572 until his death. He was the son of Cairell mac Muiredaig Muinderg (died 532) and brother of Demmán mac Cairill (died 572), previous Kings of Ulaid. According to some sources, he was high-king of Ireland.

Báetán sought to impose his authority over Dál Riata in Scotland, and over the Isle of Man. Medieval Ulster genealogists describe him as rí Érenn ocus Alban (king of Ireland and Scotland), and quote from a poem, now lost, which has him receiving tribute from Munster, Connaught, Skye and the Isle of Man. This is probably to overstate his power, and represents what it meant to be high-king in much later times, rather than in Báetán's day.

Báetán is said to have forced the king of Dál Riata to pay homage to him at Rinn Seimne on Islandmagee near Larne, modern County Antrim possibly in 574 or early 575. Áedán mac Gabráin is thought to be the king in question, and Ulster sources say that Báetán collected tribute from Scotland. Báetán's power can best be judged by the actions of his enemies, Áed mac Ainmuirech of Northern Uí Néill and Áedán mac Gabráin of Dál Riata. In 575, at Druim Cett, these two met and made an alliance, fostered by the future Saint Columba, a member of the Cenél Conaill like Áed, to oppose Báetán's attempts to increase his power by extending Dál Fiatach influence beyond the isle of Ireland.

The Annals of Ulster record an expedition of the Ulaid to the Isle of Man in 577 and their return in 578 in which Báetán imposed his authority on the island. In 582 after his death, the annals record the taking of Man by Áedán mac Gabráin.

Báetán was unable to achieve his ends, but he was not the last king of the Ulaid to seek conquests and allies overseas. Fiachnae mac Báetáin of the Dál nAraidi would follow the same path in the 620s and Congal Cáech in the 630s.

Báetán was married to a woman of the Ui Tuitre (a tribe of the Airgialla west of Lough Neagh in modern County Tyrone) with whom he may have had an alliance. Báetán's descendants did not hold the kingship which became the monopoly of his brother's descendants, the Clan Demmáin. His sons were killed by their cousin Máel Dúin mac Fiachnai. This is recorded in the annals in the year 605 where it is said they were slain by their uterine brother.

== Báetán in Legend and Romance ==
Don Carleton suggests that the character King Bagdemagus or Bademagu, who features in some continental Arthurian romances, has his origins in Báetán mac Cairill, and that the boar hunt described in the tale of Culhwch ac Olwen in the Mabinogion is an allegorical account of a military campaign fought against Báetán mac Cairill in South Wales.

== See also ==
- Kings of Ulster
