= Ainbíth mac Áedo =

Ainbíth mac Áedo (also Ainfíth mac Áeda) (died 882) was a Dál Fiatach king of Ulaid, which is now Ulster, Ireland. He was the grandson of Eochaid mac Fiachnai (died 810), a previous king of Ulaid. He ruled from 873–882.

His father was Áed mac Eochada (died 839) who killed his own brother Muiredach mac Eochada (died 839), King of Ulaid. However Áed was killed that same year by his nephew, Matudán mac Muiredaig (died 857) who became King of Ulaid. Matudán was succeeded by a member of the rival Dal nAraide sept, Lethlobar mac Loingsig (died 873). Ainbíth may have been recognized as heir for we find him commanding the forces of Ulaid in 864. In that year the high king Áed Findliath (died 879) of the northern Ui Neill and his ally Flann mac Conaing of Brega (died 868) inflicted a heavy defeat on the Ulaid.

Ainbíth became king in 873 upon the death of the aged Lethlobar and the annals record that he waged war with his neighbors. In 878 the Ulaid killed Cummascach mac Muiredaig, King of the Uí Cremthainn (a tribe of the Airgialla in eastern County Fermanagh and northern County Monaghan). In 882 the Ualid fought a skirmish with the Conaille Muirtheimne (located in Dundalk area of County Louth). Ainbíth was slain along with his ally Conallán mac Máele Dúin, king of Coba (the Uí Echach Cobo of west County Down).

His son Fiachnae mac Ainbítha (died 886) was also a King of Ulaid.
