= Cairell mac Muiredaig Muinderg =

Cairell mac Muiredaig Muinderg (died 532) also Cairell Coscrach ("victorious") was a king of Ulaid from the Dal Fiatach. He was the son of Muiredach Muinderg mac Forggo (died 489) and brother of Eochaid mac Muiredaig Muinderg (died 509), previous kings.

His accession date is given in the Annals of Tigernach in 509, and the accession of his successor is in 532 This annal gives him a reign from 509 to 532

In the period following the destruction of Emain Macha after 450, Ulidia underwent a recuperation in which the Dal Fiatach emerge as the overlords with his father Muiredach as the first historical king. In 496/498, the annals record the storming of Dún Lethglaise (Downpatrick, modern County Down) which may be connected with the rise of Dal Fiatach in this area which was to become their power base.

The Tripartite Life of St. Patrick has a story that Saint Patrick cursed the descendants of his brother Eochaid and gave his blessing to the descendants of Cairell. Cairell's descendants did monopolize the kingship. His known sons were Demmán mac Cairill (died 572) and Báetán mac Cairill (died 581), both kings of Ulaid.
