= Cináed mac Conaing =

Cináed mac Conaing (died 851) was King of Knowth in the medieval Irish province of Mide, succeeding his father Conaing mac Flainn in 849.

Cináed's family belonged to the Knowth, or Uí Chonaing, branch of the Síl nÁedo Sláine, part of the southern branch of the dominant Uí Néill kin group. The leadership of the southern branch rested with the rival Clann Cholmáin whose chief, Máel Sechnaill mac Máele Ruanaid, was High King of Ireland. Even within the Síl nÁedo Sláine, Cináed and his kin had a rival in the shape of Tigernach mac Fócartai, king of Lagore.

In 850 Cináed allied himself with the Viking armies in the Irish midlands. He and his allies, say the Annals of Ulster, "plundered [the southern] Uí Néill from the Shannon to the sea" burning churches and settlements. This is portrayed as a rebellion against Máel Sechnaill, but the target may well have been Cináed's local rival Tigernach whose crannog in Loch Gabhair was burned, along with the nearby church at Trevet.

The following year, the Irish annals record, Cináed was treacherously executed by being drowned by Máel Sechnaill and Tigernach, presumably at a conference as the annals add that this was "in spite of the guarantees of the nobles of Ireland, and the successor of Patrick [i.e. the abbot of Armagh] in particular".

Cináed was succeeded by his brother Flann. According to saga material embedded in the Fragmentary Annals of Ireland, the Viking king Amlaíb was married to a daughter of Cináed, and killed his brother Auisle in an argument over her. Whether this wife existed, and if she did, whether she was the daughter of this Cináed, or of the king of the Picts Cináed mac Ailpín, or of some other Cináed, is unclear.
