= Callan River =

River in County Armagh, Northern Ireland

Coordinates: 54°25′N 6°40′W

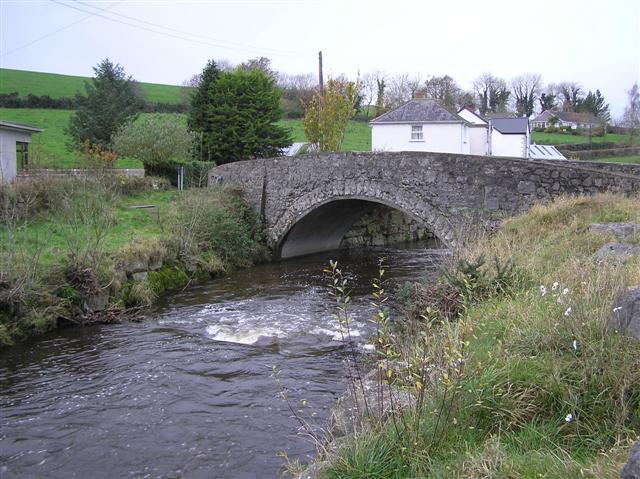
Bridge over the Callan

The Callan River is a river in County Armagh, Northern Ireland. Rising near Tullnawood lake, it flows in a generally northerly direction, past Darkley, passing within a few miles of Keady town, through Tassagh and on to Armagh. It joins the River Blackwater 1.3 km (0.8 mi) downstream from Charlemont or 1.6 km (1 mi) upstream from Bond's Bridge. It is navigable by dinghy or canoe for 2 km (1.2 mi) to Fairlawn Bridge.

The area upstream of Armagh has many former linen mills that were built to use the waterpower of the river. There is also a viaduct at Tassagh that once carried the railway line from Armagh to Keady.

Originally the Callan was joined at Fairlawn Bridge by the River Tall, coming from the direction of Richhill and Ballyhegan, but the Tall was diverted at a point 2 km (1.2 mi) upstream of the former confluence into a cut excavated in 1851–4 which conveys it directly to the Blackwater just above Verner's Bridge.

A second cut, completed in 1855, partly diverted the Callan itself, by means of a weir at Clonmain Mill near the junction of the Summerisland Road and the Cloveneden Road, to the Tall just upstream of its own diversion, but the bulk of the Callan has continued in its original course.

== People ==
- Niall Caille Mac Aedo (791–846) was King of Ireland and defeated the Danes at Derry in 833 and at Lough Swilly in 843. He drowned in the River Callan, near Armagh.

== See also ==
- List of rivers of Ireland

== Bibliography ==
- CPW-I, Commissioners of Public Works (Ireland) (1853). "Twentieth report 1852-1853". HMSO (Enhanced parliamentary papers on Ireland).
