= Aitíth mac Laigni =

Aitíth mac Laigni (died 898) (also Aidíth) was a King of Ulaid, which is now Ulster, Ireland. He belonged to a branch of the Dal nAraide known as the Uí Echach Cobo in the west part of county Down. He ruled as King of Ulaid from 896-98.

His last direct ancestor to hold the throne of Ulaid was Fergus mac Áedáin (died 692) of whom he was a 6th generation descendant. He possibly became King of Coba (Cuib) in 882 on the death of Conallán mac Máele Dúin.

He first appears in the annals in 893 when he caused a disturbance at Armagh between the Ulaid and the Cenél nEógain. Some men were killed and the abbot Máel Brigte mac Tornáin had to separate the disputing parties. Compensation had to be paid to the abbot for this. That same year, he slew the King of Ulaid, Bécc mac Airemóin of the Dal Fiatach. He was then responsible for the assassination of Muiredach mac Eochocáin (died 895), another Dal Fiatach King of Ulaid.

Aitíth became king in 896. In the year of his accession, the king of Ard Cianachta, Cummascach mac Muiredaig, (a subject tribe of Brega in County Louth) was killed by the Ulaid. Also in 896 he led a force in alliance with the Conaille Muirtheimne (of the Dundalk area of County Louth) which defeated the Norse and slew Amlaíb son of Ímar.

Aitíth's activities in Louth aroused the southern Ui Neill king of Brega. In 897 the King of Brega, Máel Finnia mac Flannacain (died 903) defeated the forces of the Ulaid at the Battle of Rath Cró. Among the slain were Muiredach mac Mac Éitig, King of Dal nAraide and Aindiarraid mac Máele Mocheirge, King of the Leth Cathail (Lecale) branch of the Dal Fiatach. Aitíth escaped from the battle but was severely wounded. The next year in 898 he was assassinated by his own associates.

His descendants, the Ua hAiteidh, dominated the Uí Echach Cobo from the late 10th century until the early 12th century.
