= Niall Caille =

High King of Ireland

Niall mac Áeda (died 846), called Niall Caille (Niall of the Callan) to distinguish him from his grandson Niall mac Áeda (died 917), was High King of Ireland.

== Background ==
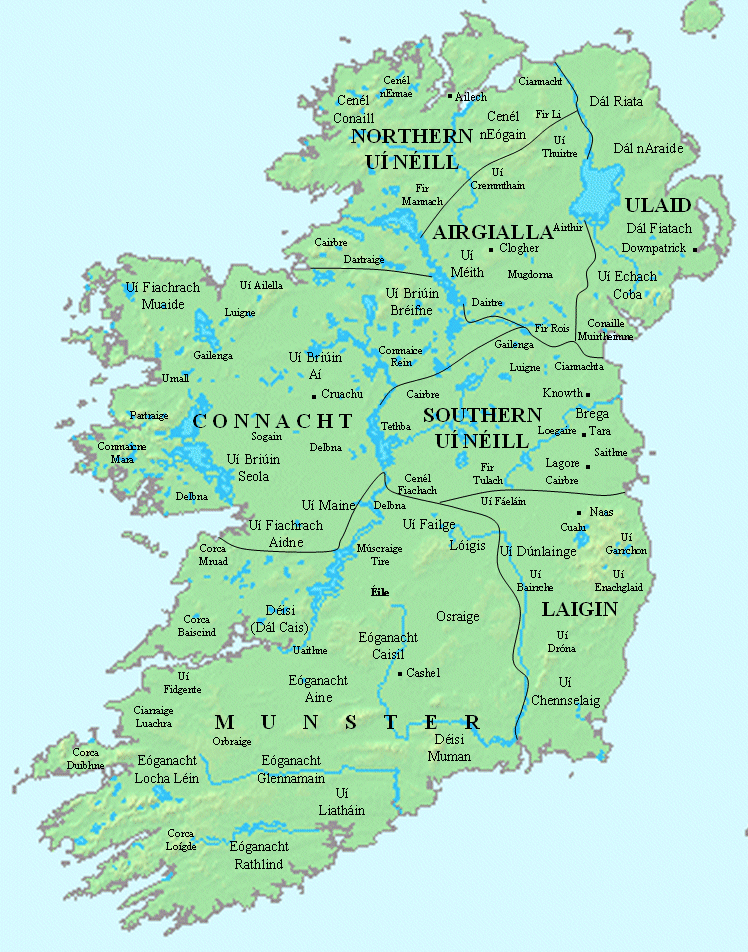
Peoples and kingdoms of Early Christian Ireland.

Niall belonged to Cenél nEógain, a northern branch of the Uí Néill, a kin group whose rulers dominated large parts of Ireland. He was the son of Áed mac Néill (died 819), called Áed Oirdnide, who had himself been High King. According to the 12th century Banshenchas (Lore of Women), his mother was Medb, daughter of Indrechtach mac Muiredaig of the Uí Briúin of Connacht.

The High Kingship of Ireland was in practice shared between Cenél nEógain of the north and the southern Clann Cholmáin branch of the Uí Néill, so that when Niall's father died, he was not succeeded by his son, or by a cousin, but by Conchobar mac Donnchada of Clann Cholmáin, whose father Donnchad Midi had been High King before Áed. Nor did Niall immediately succeed to the leadership of Cenél nEógain on his father's death. His second cousin Murchad mac Máele Dúin was chosen to be King of Ailech and chief of Cenél nEógain. It was not until 823, when the Annals of Ulster record that Murchad was deposed, that Niall became king of Ailech.

== King of Ailech ==
In 827 a conflict within the important church at Armagh led to war. The late Annals of the Four Masters provide a long account of the events. According to this, Cummascach mac Cathail of the Uí Cremthainn, king of the Airgíalla, expelled Niall's confessor Éogan Mainistrech from Armagh, installing his own half-brother, Artrí mac Conchobair, who may have been the son of High King Conchobar mac Donnchada, as abbot of Armagh. The Annals of Ulster describe Artrí as bishop of Armagh in 825 when he imposed the Law of Patrick on Connacht together with Feidlimid mac Crimthainn, the King of Munster, suggesting that he was both acting abbot and as such the spiritual heir of Saint Patrick.

Whatever the exact cause of the conflict, Niall raised an army among the Cenél nEógain and Cenél Conaill and marched on Armagh. He was faced by Cummascach and the Airgíalla, who had been joined by Muiredach mac Eochada, the king of Ulster, and his army. According to the Annals of the Four Masters, the battle at Leth Cam, near modern Kilmore, County Armagh, lasted three days. It was a decisive victory for Niall and the northern Uí Néill. Cummascach and his brother Congalach were killed, the Annals of Ulster adding that "many other kings of the Airgialla" also died there. The defeat broke the power of the Airgíalla who were thereafter subject to the northern Uí Néill kings. Artrí was deposed from the abbacy of Armagh and Niall may have installed Éogan Mainistrech there as he is called abbot of Armagh by the Annals of Ulster in the notice of his death in 834.

== King of Tara ==
After the death of Conchobar mac Donnchada in 833, Niall became High King. His reign began auspiciously with a victory over Vikings who had raided Derry. This was followed in 835 by an expedition to Leinster. The Annals of Ulster say "Niall led an army to Laigin and he set up a king over the Laigin". His chosen candidate as king of Leinster was Bran mac Fáeláin of the Uí Dúnlainge. The same year he raided the southern Uí Néill and ravaged the country as far south as modern County Offaly.

The following year, 836, Niall came into conflict with the King of Munster, Feidlimid mac Crimthainn. Feidlimid, who was a churchman as well as a king, abbot of Clonfert and supporter of the austere Céli Dé reformers, attacked Kildare and captured Forindán, the abbot of Armagh. Although this may have been a challenge to Niall, Benjamin Hudson notes that Forindán had replaced Diarmait ua Tigernáin the year before, and that it is not known which of the two rivals Niall supported. In 838 Niall and Feidlimid held a rígdal, a royal conference, either at Cloncurry or at Clonfert. Southern sources such as the Annals of Innisfallen say that Niall acknowledged Feidlimid as High King while northern sources such as the Annals of Ulster simply report the meeting without any further details.

Whatever agreements were made at the rígdal, they did not end the conflict between Feidlimid and Niall. In 840 Feidlimid led an army to the Hill of Tara, where High Kings were inaugurated, and camped there, while Niall again raided into Offaly to undermine support for Feidlimid there. The two did not meet in battle until 841, at Mag nÓchtair, near Cloncurry, where Niall was the victor. A poem in the Annals of Ulster reads: "The crozier of devout Feidlimid/ Was abandoned in the blackthorns;/ Niall, mighty in combat, took it/ By right of victory in battle with swords." Although Feidlimid ruled for five more years, finally dying in 847, perhaps of disease, he never again campaigned in the north.

While Niall was active in opposing Viking raids in his own lands in the north, he appears not to have campaigned against Viking forces elsewhere. During his reign, the focus of Viking activity moved to the east coast and midlands of Ireland, with permanent settlements established at Lough Neagh and near Dublin. Niall defeated Vikings at Mag nÍtha, in modern County Donegal, in 845. The following year he drowned in the Callan River close to Armagh, from which event his epithet derives. He was buried at Armagh. Niall was followed as High King by Máel Sechnaill mac Máele Ruanaid of Clann Cholmáin.

== Family ==
Niall was married to Gormflaith ingen Donncadha, a sister of Conchobar mac Donnchada. She died in 861 and the notice of her death in the Annals of Ulster calls her "a most charming queen of the Irish". Niall's children included Áed Findliath, known as such to distinguish him from his grandfather, who was later High King and is recorded as Gormflaith's son, as well as a daughter whose name is not recorded who married Conaing mac Flainn of the Síl nÁedo Sláine, and several other sons.

== Notes ==
Niall Caille Cenél nEógain
Regnal titles
Preceded by Murchad mac Máele Dúin	King of Ailech; 823–846	Succeeded by Máel Dúin mac Áeda
Preceded by Conchobar mac Donnchada	High King of Ireland; 833–846	Succeeded by Máel Sechnaill mac Máele Ruanaid
