= Lorcán mac Cathail =

Lorcán mac Cathail (blinded 864) was a King of Uisnech and Mide of the Clann Cholmáin. Lorcán ruled in as King of Mide from 862–864.

His exact dynastic affiliations are unknown. The death of a certain Cathal mac Conchobair is mentioned in the annals in 843. If this was his father he may have been the grandson of the High King Conchobar mac Donnchada (died 833). Upon the death of Máel Ruanaid mac Donnchada Midi of Mide in 843, a succession dispute broke out. Whether the mention of Cathals's death in that year by the annals implies that Cathal died as part of this dispute or was the heir (he would have been senior in the clan at that time) and his death led to the dispute, is not mentioned. Lorcán did succeed to the throne himself in 862 possibly as senior heir.

The new High King was Áed Findliath (died 877) of the northern Uí Néill kindred of the Cenél nEógain. He however met much resistance from members of the southern Uí Néill. Lorcán mac Cathail, allied himself with Amlaib, Ímar and Auisle (the leaders of the Norse) against Flann mac Conaing of Brega. Flann was a former ally of Dublin, and still Áed's most important ally in the central part of Ireland. Lorcán and his Norse allies plundered Brega in 863, and in 864 Conchobar mac Donnchada, (called the other king of Mide) presumably an ally of Flann against Lorcán, was captured and drowned near Clonard on Amlaibhs order. Áed led an host to Míde, captured Lorcán and blinded him. As a result, Lorcán had to abdicate. It is not known when he died.

One of his sons, who is unnamed, is mentioned as being responsible for the killing of the heir of the high king Flann Sinna in 901. In connection with this event the historian Charles-Edwards advances the theory that Lorcán was actually a member of the Luigne tribe as his son is called one of the kings of Luigne. If so, then the theory is that Lorcán was appointed as the representative of Máel Sechnaill mac Maíl Ruanaid to administer Mide while he was high king. However the Annals of the Four Masters do not refer to him as king of luigne but as the son of the King of Mide. This theory could explain why Conchobar mac Donnchada was called the other king of Mide in the notice of his drowning by the Vikings in 864. He may have been the rightful heir to Mide but his dynastic association with the Clann Cholmáin is also uncertain
