= Eochocán mac Áedo =

Eochocán mac Áedo (died 883) was a Dál Fiatach king of Ulaid, which is now Ulster, Ireland. He was the grandson of Eochaid mac Fiachnai (died 810), a previous king of Ulaid. He ruled from 882-883.

His father Áed mac Eochada had died in 839. In 882 he succeeded his brother Ainbíth mac Áedo as leth-rí (half-king or co-ruler) of Ulaid jointly with his other brother, Airemón mac Áedo (died 886). However, the next year in 883, Eochocán was killed by his nephews, the sons of Ainbíth.

He had married Inderb ingen Máel Dúin of the Cenél nEógain, daughter of Máel Dúin mac Áeda, King of Ailech (died 867). His sons Muiredach mac Eochocáin (died 895) and Áed mac Eochocáin (died 919) were also kings of Ulaid.
