= Muiredach Muinderg =

Muiredach Muinderg mac Forggo (died 489) was a king of Ulaid from the Dál Fiatach. He was the son of Forgg mac Dalláin. His sobriquet means red-necked.

His death date is given in the Annals of Tigernach in 489. The Book of Leinster gives him a reign of 24 years giving a possible reign of 465–489. Nothing is recorded of him in the annals other than his death date.

In the period following the destruction of Emain Macha after 450, Ulidia underwent a recuperation in which the Dal Fiatach emerge as the overlords and Muiredach as the first historical king. According to the Dal Fiatach genealogies, he received the blessing of Saint Patrick. The early seat of power of this dynasty appears to have been in County Louth at Óchtar Cuillche (Colland) at Collon, south of Ardee, County Louth and his descendants are said to have split up their inheritance here in the early 6th century.

Five sons of Muiredach are mentioned including Eochaid mac Muiredaig Muinderg (died 509) and Cairell mac Muiredaig Muinderg (died 532), both kings of Ulaid.
