= Style of the Scottish sovereign =

The Royal Banner of Scotland, used as a personal flag of the monarchs of Scotland since the early 12th century

The style of the Scottish sovereign refers to the styles and forms of address used by Scottish royalty, specifically the monarchs of Scotland from the earliest to the present, including monarchs from the Pictish period to the British period.

== Earliest styles ==
Examples of the earliest styles are primarily found in sources originating from Ireland. For the Early Middle Ages, the Annals of Ulster (AU) and Annals of Tigernach (AT) derive from the Iona Chronicle, a chronicle kept in Scotland. The Annals of Innisfallen are less reliable, and the forms given in that source, when in doubt, do not need to be trusted. Other sources used here are the Annals of Connacht (AC) and the Chronicon Scotorum (CS) The style almost always King's name, followed by patronymic, followed by title. The source of each style is given in brackets, followed by the year under which it follows (s.a. = sub anno); it is usually the year in which the king died. Until the eleventh century, there is no one fixed term for Scotland in Gaelic. Before the tenth century, the kings of the area now comprising modern Scotland are either "of Picts", "of Fortriu" or "of Alba", standardising after 900; but the rulers of Moray, not by historiographical tradition called "King", are called king in the sources; moreover, they are sometimes called "kings of Alba".

=== Traditional Pictish period ===
- Domangurt mac Nissi ri Alban (AT506)
- Comgall mac Domanguirt ri Alban (AT537)
- Gabrain maic Domanguirt ríg Alban (AT559)
- Cindaeladh rex Pictorum (AT578)
- Cennalath, rex Pictorum (AU, s.a. 580)
- Bruidhe mac Maelchon, ri Cruithneach (AT, s.a. 581)
- Bruide mc. Maelcon regis Pictorum (AU584)
- Bridei mac Maelchon, Ard Rig Toí (ACC)
- Ceannath K. of the Picts (AClon580)
- Garnat King of the Picts (AClon590)
- Gartnaidh regis Pictorum (AT597)
- Aedhain m. Gabrain mc. Domangairt righ Alban (AU606)
- Ægþan Scotta cyng (ASC603)
- Echdach Buidhe, regis Pictorum, filii Aedain (AU629)
- Conid Cerr, rex Dal Riati (AU629)
- Cinedon filii Lugthreni, regis Pictorum (AU631)
- Cined mac Luchtren, rex Pictorum (CS631)
- Cenay mc Lachtren king of the Picts (AClon632)
- Cinaed, rí Alban (AI 633)
- Cínaetha maic Luchtren, regis Pictorum (AT633)
- Octlarge m c Fogith K. of Picts (AClon649)
- Tolairg m. Fooith regis Pictorum (AU653)
- Tolairg mac Foóith regis Pictorum (AT653)
- Tolorchan mc Anfrith K. of the Picts (AClon653)
- Tolargain mc. Anfrith regis Pictorum (AU657)
- Tolorcan mac Ainfrith, rí Cruithne (AT656)
- Gartnait maic Domnaill, rig Cruithneach (AT663)
- Gartnayt son of Donall king of Picts (AClon659)
- Bruidhe mac Bile, rex Fortrend (AT693)
- Bruide m. Bili, rex Fortrend (AU693)
- Brude mac Derilei, ri Cruithintuathi (697 Cáin Adomnáin)
- Neactain reigis Pictorum (AT724)
- Drust regem Pictorum (AU729)
- Aongas, rí Foirtreann (FA?729)
- Drust, righ Alban (FA?729)
- Aengus mac Fergusa, rex Picctorum (AT736)
- Oengus m. Fergusso, rex Pictorum (AU736)
- Owinus rex píctorum (ACamb~741)
- Talargan rex pictorum (ACamb~750)
- Aengus rí Alban (AT759)
- Aengus mac Fergusa, rex Pictorum (AT761)
- Oengus m. Fherghussa rex Pictorum (AU761)
- Bruidhi rí Fortrenn (AT763)
- Bruide, rex Fortrenn (AU763)
- Cinadhon regis Pictorum (AU775)
- Cemoid rex pictorum (ACamb~775)
- Dub Tholargg rex Pictorum citra Monoth (AU782)
- Causantín mac Fergussa, ri Alban (AI820)
- Custantin m. Fergusa, rex Fortreinn (AU820)
- Oengus m. Fergusa, rex Fortrenn (AU834)
- Eoganán mac Oengusa rí Dáil Riatai (CGG)
- Cináed mac Alpín, ri Alban (AI858)
- Cinaedh m. Ailpin rex Pictorum (AU858)
- Ceínod rex pictorum (ACamb~858)

=== Traditional Scottish period ===
- Constantin mac Cinaeda ardri Alban (CGG)
- Domnall m. Caustantin, ri Alban (AU 900)
- Custantin m. Aedha ri Alban (AU 952)
- Mael Coluim m. Domnaill, ri Alban (AU 954)
- Dub m. Mael Coluim, ri Alban (AU 967)
- Culen m. Illuilb, ri Alban (AU 971)
- Amhlaim m. Ailuilbh, .i. ri Alban (AU 977)
- Amlaim mac Illuilb, rí Alban (AT 977)
- Cinaedh m. Mael Cholaim, ri Alban (AU 995)
- Cináeth mac Mail Cholaim, rí Alban (AT 995)
- Constantin mac Cuilindaín rí Alban (AT 997)
- ri Alban, .i. Cinaedh m. Duibh (AU 1005)
- Finnloech m. Ruaidhri, ri Alban (AU 1020)
- Findlaech mac Ruadrí rí Alban (LL)
- Mael Colaim mac Mael-Brighdi mac Ruaidrí, rí Alban (1029)
- Mael Coluim m. Cinaedha, ri Alban (AU 1034)
- Donnchad m. Crinan, rí Alban (AU 1040)
- Donncadh mac Crínan, aird-rí Alban (AT 1040)
- M. Beathadh m. Finnlaich airdrigh Alban (AU 1058)
- Mac Bethadh mac Findlaich, aird-rí Alban (AT 1058)
- Lulach, rí Alban (AT 1058)
- Mael Snechtai m. Lulaigh ri Muireb (AU 1085)
- Mael Coluim ri Alban (AU 1085)
- Mael Coluim m. Donnchadha airdri Alban (AU 1093)
- Mael Colaim mac Donnchadha, rí Alban (AT 1093)
- Mael Coluim mac Dondchada ri Alban (LL)
- Donnchadh m. Mael Coluim ri Alban (AU 1094)
- Domnall mac Donnchada, rí Alban (AT 1099)
- Etgair ri Alban (AU 1107)
- Alaxandair m. Mael Choluim ri Alban (AU 1124)
- Oenghus m. ingine Luluigh (ri Moréb) (AU 1130)
- Dabid, rí Alban (AT 1152)
- Dabid mac Mail Colaim, rí Alban & Saxan (AT 1153)
- Mael Coluim Cennmor, mac Eanric, ardri Alban, in cristaidhe as ferr do bai do Gaidhelaibh re muir anair (AU 1165)
- Ri Alban, Uilliam Garm (AU 1214)
- Uilliam, ri Alban (AU 1214)
- Roibert a Briuis, mormaer .. righ n-Alban (AU 1302 = 1306)
- Roberd a Briuis mormaer .. rig a n-Alban (AC 1306)
- Edubart Mor Ri Saxan & Bretan & Alban & Duice na Gascune & tigerna na hErend (AC 1307)
- Roibeat a Briuis, ri Alban (AU 1314)
- Righ Alban .i. Semus Sdibard (AC 1499)

== Medieval Charter styles ==
The Poppleton manuscript preserves a grant supposedly made by King Nechtan to the monastery of St. Brigid at Abernethy, c. early sixth century:

- Latin: Nectonius magnus filius Uuirp rex omnium prouiciarum Pictorum
  - English: 'Great Nechtan, son of Uurp, King of all the provinces of the Picts'

In the Scottish period, the charter styles vary at first, but later become more formulaic. Here are some examples from the early charter period. The Roman numeral which follows is the number given to the charter in Archibald C. Lawrie's Early Scottish Charters: Prior to A.D. 1153, (Glasgow, 1905):

- Machbet filius Finlach et Gruoch filia Bodhe, rex et regina Scottorum (Lawrie, V.)
  - English: 'Macbeth son of Findláech and Gruoch daughter of Bodhe, King and Queen of the Scots'. Source is the Registrum of the Priory of St Andrews, and the document is a Latin translation from an earlier Gaelic document, so the rex Scottorum style is not reliable
- Malcolmus Dei gratia Scottorum basileus (X)
  - 'Malcolm by the Grace of God, High King of the Scots'
- Edgarus Dei gratia Rex Scottorum (XVII: 1095)
  - 'Edgar by the Grace of God, King of the Scots'
- Alexander Dei gratia Rex Scottorum (XXVII)
  - 'Alexander by the Grace of God, King of the Scots'
- David Dei gratia Rex Scotiae (LXIX)
  - 'David by the Grace of God, King of Scotland'
- David Dei gratia Rex Scottorum (CIV)
  - 'David by the Grace of God, King of the Scots'

From David I onwards, the royal style is either rex Scottorum or rex Scotiae.

== From the late Middle Ages to the Acts of Union ==
In the Late Middle Ages, the styles rex Scottorum ('king of the Scots') and rex Scotiae ('king of Scotland') were used interchangeably. Similarly, the monarchs of England could be referred to as the "king of the English" as indeed Edward II of England was in the Declaration of Arbroath (1320). King of the Scots was used in "The Declaration of the Clergy in favour of Robert the Bruce" (1334), as it was in the charter by which Edward Balliol ceded the southern counties of Scotland to England. However, in many other documents King of Scotland was the preferred style, including "The Letter of the Magnates of Scotland to the King of France" (1308), "The Settlement of Succession on Robert the Bruce" (1315), the Treaty of Corbeuil (1326), the Treaty of Edinburgh–Northampton (1328), the Papal Bull authorising the anointing of Scottish Kings (1329) and the Treaty of Berwick (1357). This remained the case until the last three monarchs of Scotland, William II, Mary II and Anne, who became Queen of Great Britain following the Acts of Union 1707.

== Modern day ==
King of Scots
- Royal Standard of the United Kingdom (In Scotland)
- Present holder: Charles III
- Heir apparent: William, Duke of Rothesay
- Status: Extinct (merged in the Crown), Still used in Official subnational capacity in parts of Scotland to refer to British Monarch, since 1999
- Honorific title of the King of the United Kingdom in Scotland

Since the Act of Union, the monarch of the United Kingdom, is styled His/Her Majesty King/Queen of the United Kingdom of Great Britain and Northern Ireland.

=== King of Scots ===
The title King of Scots (Queen of Scots when the monarch is female) is an alternative title used to refer to British monarch when in Scotland. Most notably the title was widely used by the Scottish Parliament in the motion of condolence when paying tribute to Queen Elizabeth II following her death in 2022. The title had been reintroduced by Elizabeth II when she allowed the Scottish Parliament to refer to her as Queen of Scots when it was founded in 1999.

The current holder of the title is Charles III.

== Your Grace ==
Scottish monarchs were addressed as "Your Grace" before the Acts of Union of 1707, when Scotland became part of the Kingdom of Great Britain. From then, British monarchs have been addressed as "Your Majesty", even with reference to their being King/Queen of Scots.

== Notes ==
1. , Anderson, Kings, (1973), p. 249
