= Conchobar mac Donnchada =

Conchobar mac Donnchada (or Conchobar mac Donnchado) was High-King of Ireland with opposition (rí Érenn co fressabra) between 819 and 833. Conchobar was the son of Donnchad Midi, high-king of Ireland (733–797); his mother was Fuirseach, a noblewoman of the Dál nAraidi. Conchobar married Land, daughter of the former High-King Áed Oirdnide. They had a son named Atrí, who became a cleric at Armagh, as well as three other sons, Cathal, Eochócan, and Cináed.

Conchobar appears as a historical figure for the first time when, in the year 802, the high-king Áed Oirdnide mac Néill of Cenél nÉogain, Conchobar's brother-in-law (possibly father-in-law) portioned out the lordship of Clann Cholmáin between Conchobar and Ailill. Ailill was Conchobar's brother, but in the following year at Rathconnell, Conchobar killed his brother to take the whole lordship for himself. Only five years later Conchobar, allied now with the king of Connaught, campaigned for the High-Kingship. He met and defeated his former patron Áed Oirdnide, but it was not until Áed's death in 819 that Conchobar was recognized as High-King.

Even then Conchobar had to deal with the opposition of Áed's cousin, Murchad mac Máele Dúin. The latter was able to form an alliance with one of Conchobar's own subject kindreds, the Síl nÁedo Sláine. Conchobar soon became aware of the treachery, and in 822 he took revenge on this kindred in "an especially horrific slaughter". In 823 Conchobar formed an alliance with Feidlimid mac Crimthainn, King of Munster (820–847). However, Conchobar's attempts to subordinate Munster and its king proved intolerable to Feidlimid, and from 827 onwards Feidlimid mac Crimthainn was a source of opposition.

Conchobar died in unknown circumstances in 833, to which renewed Viking raids formed the backdrop. He is buried at Clonard Abbey.

== Notes ==
Conchobar mac Donnchada Clann Cholmáin
Regnal titles
Preceded by Áed Oirdnide	High King of Ireland; 819–833	Succeeded by Niall Caille
