= Rí =

Ancient Gaelic word meaning "king"

Rí, or commonly ríg (genitive), is an ancient Gaelic word meaning 'king'. It is used in historical texts referring to the Irish and Scottish kings, and those of similar rank. While the Modern Irish word is exactly the same, in modern Scottish Gaelic it is rìgh, apparently derived from the genitive. Cognates include Gaulish rix, Latin rex/regis and German Reich.

There were three grades of rí: a ruiri or 'overking' was a major, regional king and superior to a rí túath 'king of [many] peoples' or a rí buiden 'king of a troop' either of whom, in turn, were superior to several figures known as rí benn 'king of peaks' or rí túaithe 'king of a single people'.

== Three traditional grades ==
The three traditional grades of rí in Gaelic Ireland was largely symbolic. As time went on, the real power of many lesser kings could equal or even eclipse those of higher grade.

=== Rí benn ===
A rí benn ('king of peaks'), or rí túaithe ('king of a single people'), was most commonly a local petty king of a single túath, although one túath might be many times the size of another. There are generally estimated to have been between 100 and 150 in Ireland, depending on who really qualified.

Importantly, in theory every king of a superior grade was also a rí benn himself, and exercised no direct compulsory legal authority outside his own ancestral túath. Kings were bound to others by military allegiance and the payment of tribute.

Examples:

- Kings of Thira Dha Locha
- Kings of Umaill

=== Rí buiden ===
A rí buiden ('king of troops'), also rí túath ('king of [many] peoples') or ruiri ('overking'), was a regional king to whom several rí benn were subordinate, and often other territories. He was in some sense still a petty king, but could also achieve provincial-level prominence, including, although rarely, the provincial kingship, and was often fully sovereign in any case. Depending on who was counted, there may have been as many as 20 genuine ruiri in Ireland at any one time.

Examples:

- Kings of Osraige
- Kings of Breifne
- Kings of Uí Maine
- Kings of Moylurg
- Kings of Iar Connacht

=== Rí ruirech ===
A "king of over-kings", a rí ruirech was often a provincial (rí cóicid) or semi-provincial king to whom several ruiri were subordinate. They were also referred to as ri bunaid cach cinn ('ultimate king of every individual'). Several kingdoms belonging to the 1st and 2nd millennia are listed below, but do not all belong to the same periods. No more than six genuine rí ruirech were ever contemporary, with the average being three or four. Originally, there were only five provinces, at least according to legend (see the Táin Bó Cúailnge, the actual text thereof).

Examples:

- Kings of Ulster
- Kings of Munster
- Kings of Mide
- Kings of Connacht
- Kings of Leinster

== Ard Rí ==
The ard rí, or 'High King' (of Ireland), was traditionally the supreme ruler of all the Irish provinces, subject to no higher domestic authority. While the rí ruirech were in theory subordinate to the high king, Irish stories and mythology relate that the power of the high king varied considerably throughout the office's existence, and he was usually not more than a figurehead exercising suzerainty over the largely independent lower kingdoms.

According to tradition, the high king was originally crowned at Lia Fáil upon the Hill of Tara in Meath, in the Kingdom of Mide. When stood upon by a candidate for the throne, if they were the rightful High King of Ireland, the stone monument was said to loudly roar in joy. The stone was supposedly split by the sword of Cú Chulainn when it refused to acknowledge his preferred candidate Lugaid Riab nDerg, following which it never called out again.

- High King of Ireland

In Scotland, the Ard Rí initially had very little centralized power. Instead, he exercised suzerainty over the lower kingdoms, much like his Irish counterpart. This would change as Scotland combined into a more centralized state, and the High King gathered more power over regional monarchs. This was to the point where the regional Kings were referred to as earls by the English rather than the proper term, Rí.

- High King of Scotland
- Style of the monarchs of Scotland

== Scotland ==
Scotland had a variety of rí as well. In addition to the monarch or 'high king' there were others, although these are conventionally styled only lords in the English language.

- Lord of the Isles
- Lords of Galloway
- Lords of Argyle

There were also a number of Kings of Moray, who are commonly styled mormaers in later Scottish tradition, but properly styled rí in contemporary Irish sources. The famous Macbeth of Scotland is argued to have begun his career as Ruiri of Moray.

A number of Scottish monarchs styled themselves 'High King of Scotland,' 'High King of Picts,' or 'High King of Alba,' using the following variants of the term Ard Rí:

- Ard Ríg Toí
- Ardrí
- Aird-Rí
- Airdrígh
- Airdrí

Other than the Irish/Scottish Gaelic titles, some styled themselves in Latin:

- Scottorum Basileus
- Rex omnium prouiciarum Pictorum ('King of All the Provinces of the Picts')

== See also ==
- White Wand
- Flaith
- Tigerna
- Grand Prince of Kiev
- Imperator totius Hispaniae
- Irish nobility
- Ollam
- Overqueen
- Ríg (Norse god)
