= Dál Fiatach =

Gaelic dynastic-grouping and territory

- Parent house: Ulaid-Dáirine
- Country: Ireland
- Founded: 1st century AD
- Founder: Fiatach Finn
- Current head: none
- Final ruler: Ruaidrí mac Duinn Sléibe
- Titles: Kings of Emain Macha; Kings of Ulster; Kings of Dál Fiatach; High Kings of Ireland; Kings of Tara
- Dissolution: 13th century AD

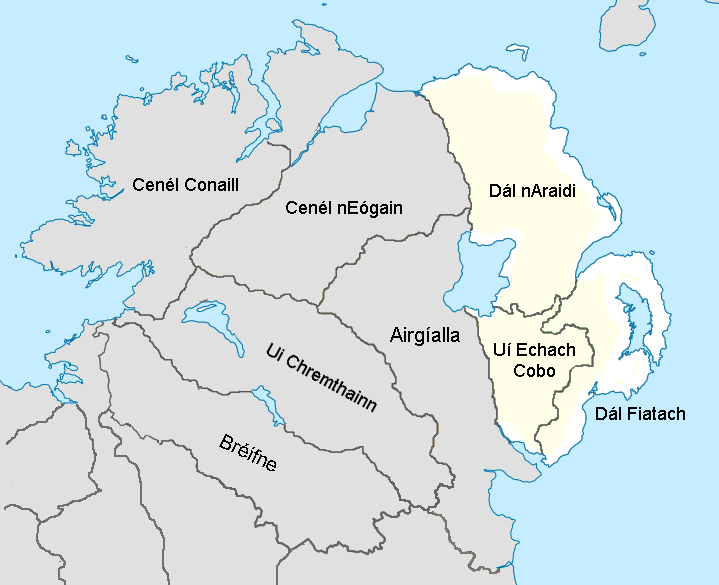
Ulaid and its three main sub-kingdoms (highlighted in yellow) in the 10th–11th century

Dál Fiatach was a Gaelic dynastic-grouping and the name of their territory in the north-east of Ireland, which lasted throughout the Middle Ages until their demise in the 13th century at the hands of Normans. It was part of the over-kingdom of Ulaid, and they were its main ruling dynasty for most of Ulaid's history. Their territory lay in eastern County Down. Their capital was Dún Lethglaise (Downpatrick) and from the 9th century their main religious site was Bangor Abbey.

== Description ==
The Dál Fiatach are claimed as being descended from Fiatach Finn mac Dáire, a legendary King of Ulaid and High King of Ireland, and are thought to be related to both the Voluntii and Darini of Ptolemy's Geographia. They are also perhaps more directly related to the pre-historic Dáirine, and the later Corcu Loígde of Munster. Kinship with the Osraige is also supported, and more distantly with the Dál Riata.

The Ulaid, of which the Dál Fiatach at times were the ruling dynasty, are further associated with the so-called Érainn. The Dál Fiatach claimed kinship with the legendary Cú Roí mac Dáire and the Clanna Dedad.

The Dál Fiatach are considered by scholars to be the true historical Ulaid (< *Uluti), but after the fortunes of the dynasty declined in the 7th century, the legendary heroes of the Ulster Cycle were in fact claimed as ancestors by the rival and unrelated Dál nAraidi or Cruthin, claiming for political reasons to be the "true Ulaid" themselves and descendants of Rudraige mac Sithrigi through Conall Cernach. The legendary Ulaid, a people presumably related in some way to the ancestors of the Dál Fiatach, although this is not clearly preserved in the later genealogical traditions, are sometimes called the Clanna Rudraige. However, rather than contesting the quite false claims of the Cruthin to their ancient glory, the Dál Fiatach appear to have chosen to stress their kinship with the Clanna Dedad of Munster, fearsome rivals of the Clanna Rudraige. Thus with their own ancestors appropriated by the Dál nAraidi, the Dál Fiatach apparently had no choice but to transform themselves into descendants of their nearest kin they could remember. While kinship with the Dáirine and/or Clanna Dedad (Érainn) is not contested by scholars, it can be assumed the early generations of the Dál Fiatach pedigree are quite corrupt. This is also true for the pedigree of the Dáirine and Corcu Loígde. Their natural kinship with the Munster dynasties can only be reconstructed in studies of Ptolemy's Ireland and by linguistics.

Every known king of Dál Fiatach became King of Ulster (Ulaid), but they did not monopolise the kingship as the Dál nAraidi supplied a number of powerful kings. Among the more influential Dál Fiatach kings were:

- Muiredach Muinderg (d. 489)
- Báetán mac Cairill (d. 581)
- Fiachnae mac Demmáin (d. 627)
- Bécc Bairrche mac Blathmaic (d. 718)
- Fiachnae mac Áedo Róin (d. 789)
- Niall mac Eochada (d. 1063),

A junior branch of the Dál Fiatach ruled Lecale, the peninsula south of the Dál Fiatach capital, Dún Lethglaise (modern-day Downpatrick). Dún Lethglaise itself, already the royal centre of the Dál Fiatach would become a prestigious monastic site. In later times, from the 9th century, Bangor, originally controlled by the neighbouring Dál nAraidi, became the main religious site patronised by the kings.

== Tribes ==
Below are a list of some of the tribes that were part of or claimed descent from the Dál Fiatach:

- Dál mBuinne, also known as the Muintir Branáin located near Moylinny, County Antrim. An Ulaid tribe, their name is preserved in the medieval deanery of Dalboyn.
- Leth Cathail, an offshoot of the Dál Fiatach, located in and around the modern barony of Lecale, County Down.
- Uí Blathmaic, whose territory was located in the northern part of the barony of Ards and part of Castlereagh. Their name was preserved in the medieval deanery and county of Blathewyc.
- Uí Echach Arda, based in the Ards peninsula.
- Mac Duinnshléibhe, meaning "brown mountain", anglicised as MacDonlevy, Dunleavy, MacAleavey amongst other variations.
- Ó hEachaidh, meaning "son of Aghy", Anglicised variants include Haughey, MacGaughey, MacGahey, Hoey and Hoy. Also recorded as a Mac name as well as a branch of the Mac Duinnshléibhe.

== Pedigree variations ==
- Sen mac Rosin
  - Dedu mac Sin a quo Clanna Dedad
    - Íar mac Dedad
      - Dál Riata, etc.
    - Dáire mac Dedad / Dairi Sirchrechtaig / Dáire Doimthech
      - Cú Roí mac Dáire
        - Lugaid mac Con Roí
        - Fuirme mac Con Roí
          - (F)iatach Find
            - Dál Fiatach
      - Dáirine
        - Corcu Loígde
    - Conganchnes mac Dedad
    - Conall Anglonnach mac Dedad
      - Conaille Muirtheimne
  - Eochaid (Echdach/Echach) mac Sin
    - Deitsin/Deitsini
      - Dlúthaich/Dluthaig
        - Dáire/Dairi
          - Fir furmi
            - Fiatach Finn / Fiachach Fir Umai
              - Dál Fiatach

=== Further alternatives ===
A third (fourth) pedigree is given in Rawlinson B 502 at ¶689: Fiatach Find m. Dáre m. Forgo a quo Dál Fiatach rí h-Érenn. iii. co torchair la Fiachaich Fidfholaid m. Feradaich.

Dáire mac Forgo is listed as an early king of Emain Macha at ¶1481: Dáre m. Forgo m. Feideilmid (m. h-Uamunchinn) (m. Corráin m. Caiss m. Argatmáir). As Feideilmid is also the father of Fachtna Fáthach according to this particular scheme, Forgo is thus an uncle of Conchobar mac Nessa. Elsewhere Fachtna is a son of Cas, son of Rudraige mac Sithrigi (a quo Clanna Rudraige), (son of Sithrig), son of Dub, son of Fomor, son of Airgetmar.

However, Forgo (Forggo) also appears as an ancestor of Deda mac Sin at ¶1696: Dedad m. Sin m. Roshin m. Triir m. Rothriir m. Airnnil m. Maine m. Forggo m. Feradaig m. Ailella Érann m. Fiachach Fir Mara m. Óengusa Turbich Temra.

A Forgo later appears in the line of the historical kings of Dál Fiatach as the father of Muiredach Muinderg: Eochu m. Ardgair m. Matudáin m. Áeda m. Eochucain m. Áeda m. Echdach (qui habuit filios. xii.) m. Fíachnai m. Áeda Roín m. Béce Bairche m. Blaithmeic m. Máile Coba m. Fíachnai Duib Tuile m. Demmáin m. Cairill (qui credit Patricio) m. Muiredaigh Mundeirg m. Forgo m. Dallaín m. Dubthaig m. Miennaig m. Ludgach m. Óengusa Find m. Fergusa Dubdhétaig (Móen ingen Chuind Chétchthaig máthair na trí Fergus a ndochersat i cath Crinna) m. Imchado m. Findchado m. Fíatach Find (a quo Dál Fíatach) m. Fir furmi m. Dáiri m. Dlúthaig m. Deitsini m. Echach m. Sín m. Rosin m. Treín m. Rothrein m. Rogein m. Arndil m. Mane Mair m. Forgo.

== See also ==
- Dáire
- Ulaid
- Erainn
- Hoey
- Haughey
- McCaughey
- McNulty
