= Aghadoe Cathedral =

Ancient cathedral in County Kerry, Ireland

Coordinates: 52.07684°N 9.55453°W

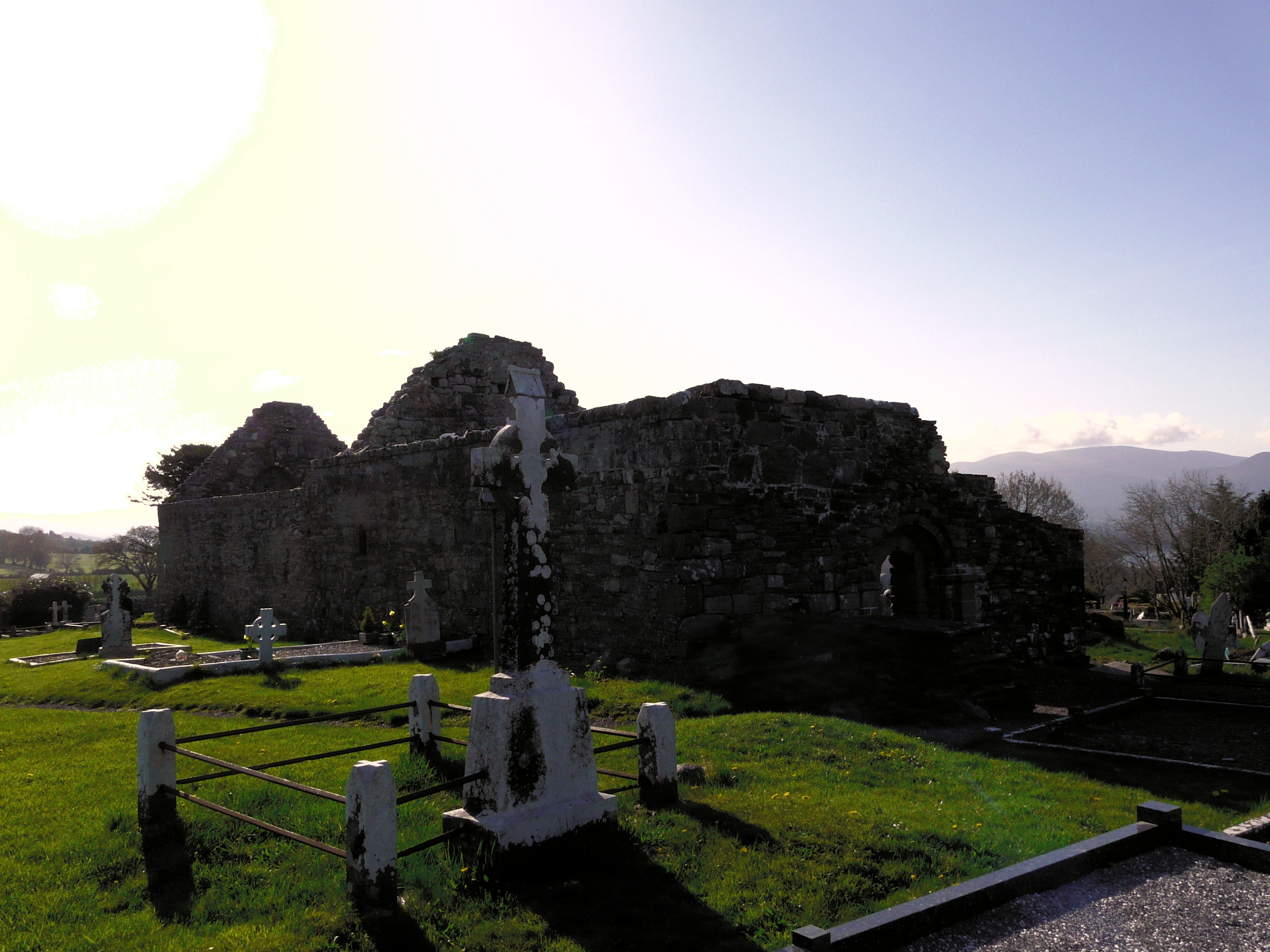
Remains of Aghadoe Cathedral

Aghadoe Cathedral was a church that may have been the seat of a bishop at Aghadoe, Ireland (later joined with the Bishopric of Ardfert). The now ruined cathedral overlooks the Lakes of Killarney from Aghadoe, a few miles from Killarney. Aghadoe may have been the site of a church as early as the seventh century, but extant remains are of a stone structure built in the eleventh and twelfth centuries.

Scottish journalist Charles Mackay visited Famine Ireland in the summer of 1849 and travelled to Killarney. He comments extensively on the grounds around Aghadoe Cathedral and how they were being used as a burial site for famine victims from the local workhouse. Mackay notes that within the one-acre church grounds surrounding the cathedral, only a small corner was used for workhouse burials. He estimates that over the past three years, from 1846 to 1849, approximately 2,000 workhouse famine victims were buried here.

== History ==
Aghadoe (Irish: Achadh Deo "place with two yews") may have begun as a pagan religious site. The site has also been associated with the fifth century missionary St. Abban, but seventh century ogham stones mark the first clear evidence of Aghadoe being used as an important site. St. Finian the Leper founded a monastery at Aghadoe in the seventh century. The first written record of a monastery dates from 939 AD in the Annals of Innisfallen where the Aghadoe monastery is referred to as the "Old Abbey." The monastery at Aghadoe had a close relationship with the one on nearby Innisfallen Island. Maelsuthain O'Carroll, one of Innisfallen's greatest scholars, was buried at Aghadoe after his death in 1010 AD, and a legend suggests that the two monasteries were connected by a causeway across Loch Lein. In 1027 the Annals make the first reference to a stone building on the site, noting the construction of Damh Liag Maenig (Maenach's house of stone). Construction on the round tower began the same year. Aghadoe witnessed the turbulence of the times. In 1061, an O'Cathail, the heir to the local dynasty of Eóganacht Locha Léin, was taken from the church and murdered.

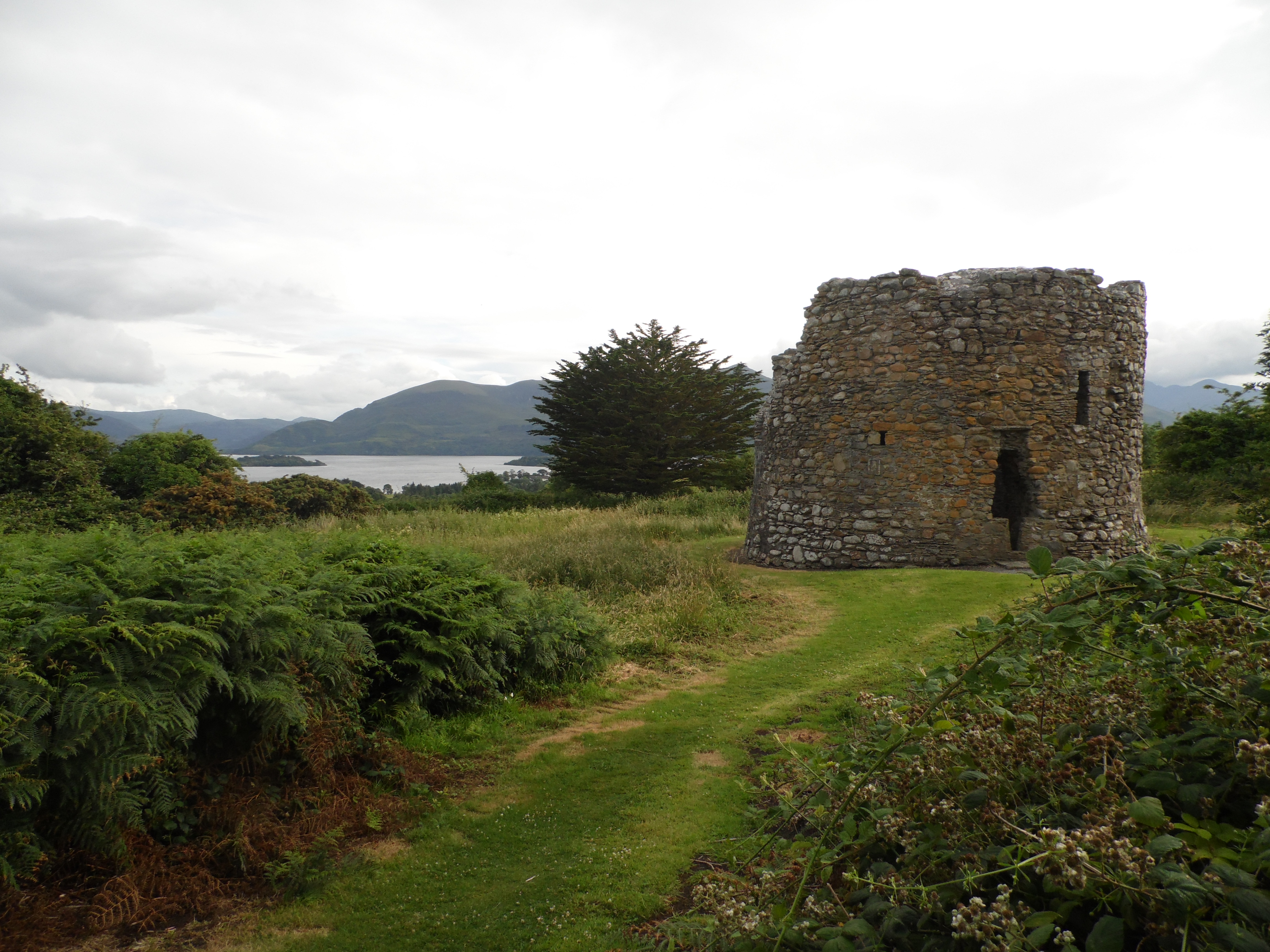
Aghadoe Walk to tower

In the middle of the twelfth century Amhlaoibh Mór Ó Donoghue, the leader of the Ó Donoghue—the new rulers of Eóganacht Locha Léin, had a new church building, later called the "Great Church," constructed in the Romanesque style and dedicated to the Holy Trinity. The new structure, completed in 1158, incorporated part of the old stone building in its northwest section and makes up the western section of the extant remains. When Amhlaoibh Mór Ó Donoghue was killed, his body was carried to Aghadoe and interred in the church. The final addition to the church was constructed in the twelfth century. The addition served as a chancel or choir, and was later separated from the rest of the church by a wall.

After being incorporated into the Bishopric of Ardfert, Aghadoe operated as a parish church under an archdeacon. The church is mentioned in a 1615 report, but it is excluded from a list of abbeys in the report suggesting it had become only an archdeaconry. The town of Aghadoe was sacked in the 1650s by Cromwell's forces. By 1740, Aghadoe is no longer listed as an active parish and seems to have ceased functioning.

== Artifacts ==
Two ogham stones have been found at Aghadoe. One is currently cemented in the south wall of the chancel and bears an inscription transcribed as "BRRUANANN" The inscription may have actually been intended as "BRREANANN," a possible reference to St. Brendan. A second ogham stone has since gone missing, but its inscription was transcribed as "GGVVSS MN." The presence of these ogham stones suggests the site's importance dates back to the mid-seventh century. Another early Christian artifact, a bullaun, can be found outside of church by the northwest corner of the nave. The bullaun may have been originally been used as a quern-stone, but it was later used as a holy water receptacle and rainwater collected in the hollow of the stone had healing properties according to lore.

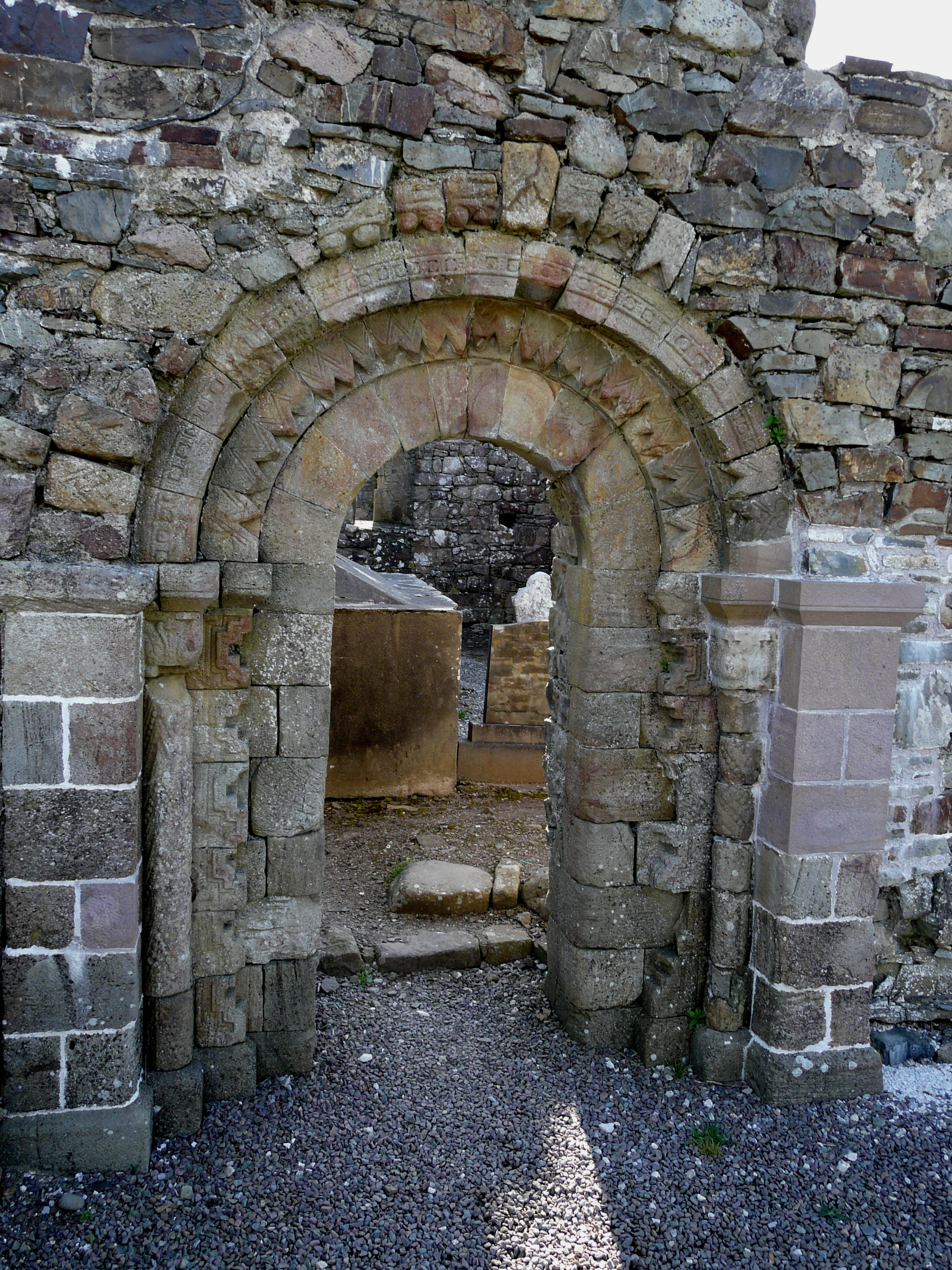
Western dooryway of the cathedral with Romanesque carvings

The "Aghadoe Crosier" from Aghadoe was made of walrus ivory and carved in the Urnes style of the Vikings. The carvings are similar to those on the jambs of Romanesque doorway to the cathedral. Another crosier, possibly associated with Aghadoe, was found in the lakes in 1867 by a fisherman who thought it was a salmon.

According to the Annals of Innisfallen, Aghadoe Cathedral's high cross toppled in a strong wind in 1282.

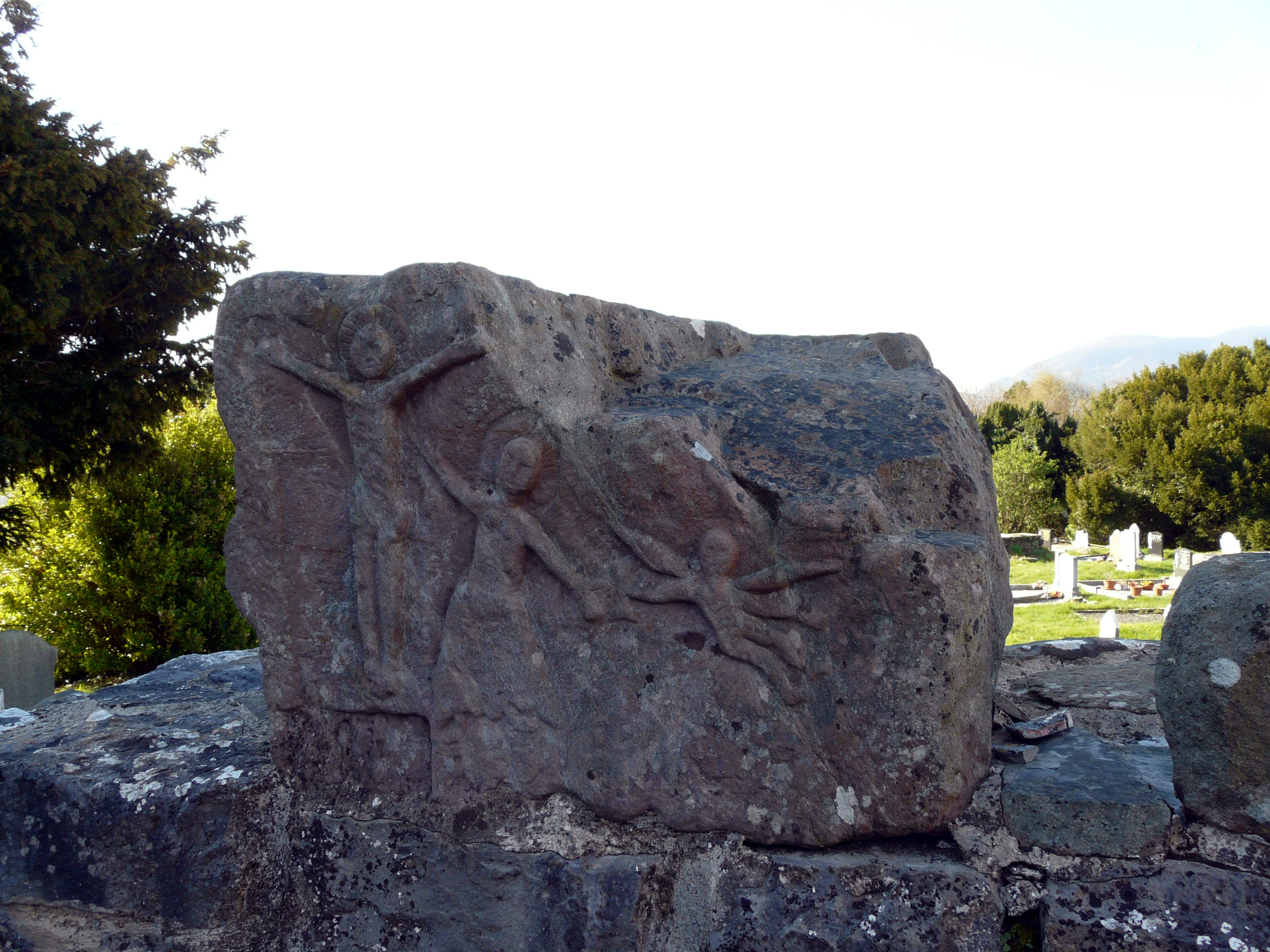
Seventeenth century carving of the crucifixion

A carved stone fragment found on the site is thought to date from the seventeenth century. It depicts the crucifixion with a female figure passing a chalice to Christ on the cross. The stone suggests Aghadoe was still used as a religious site during the seventeenth century.

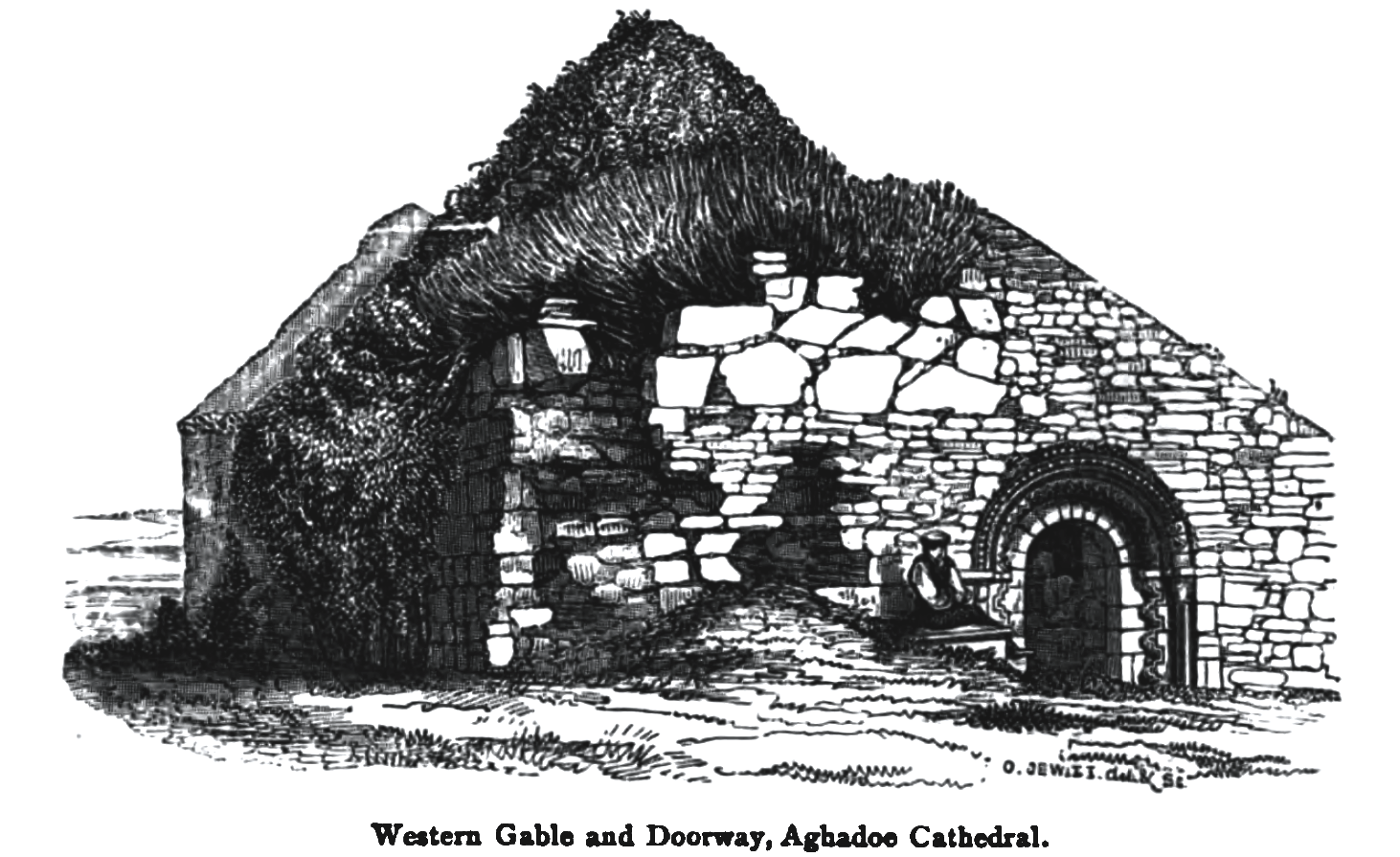
1892 sketch of Aghadoe Cathedral

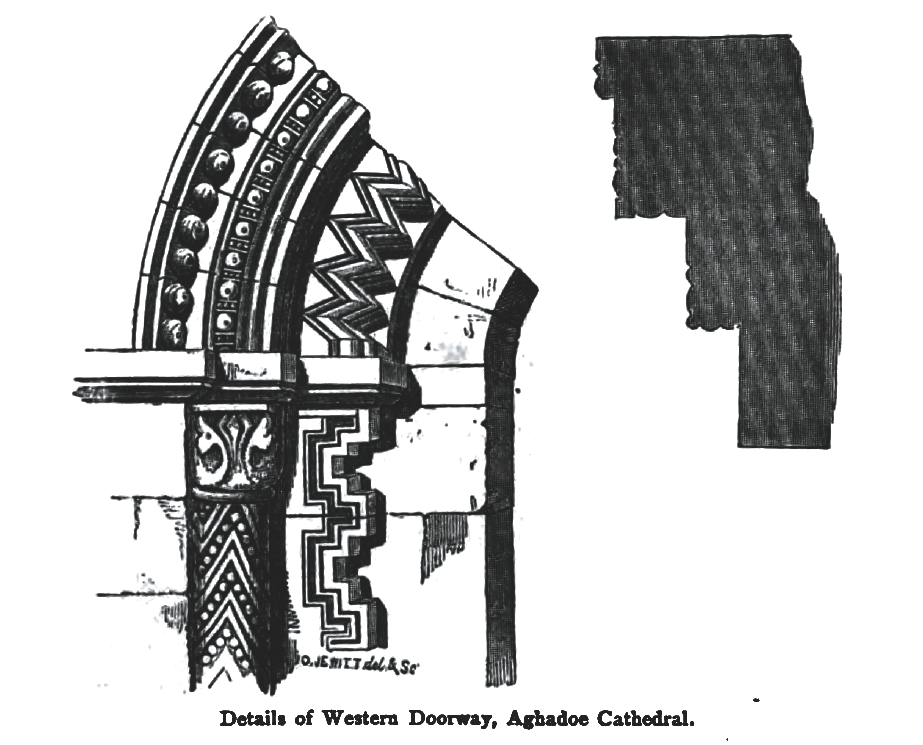
Detail of the doorway

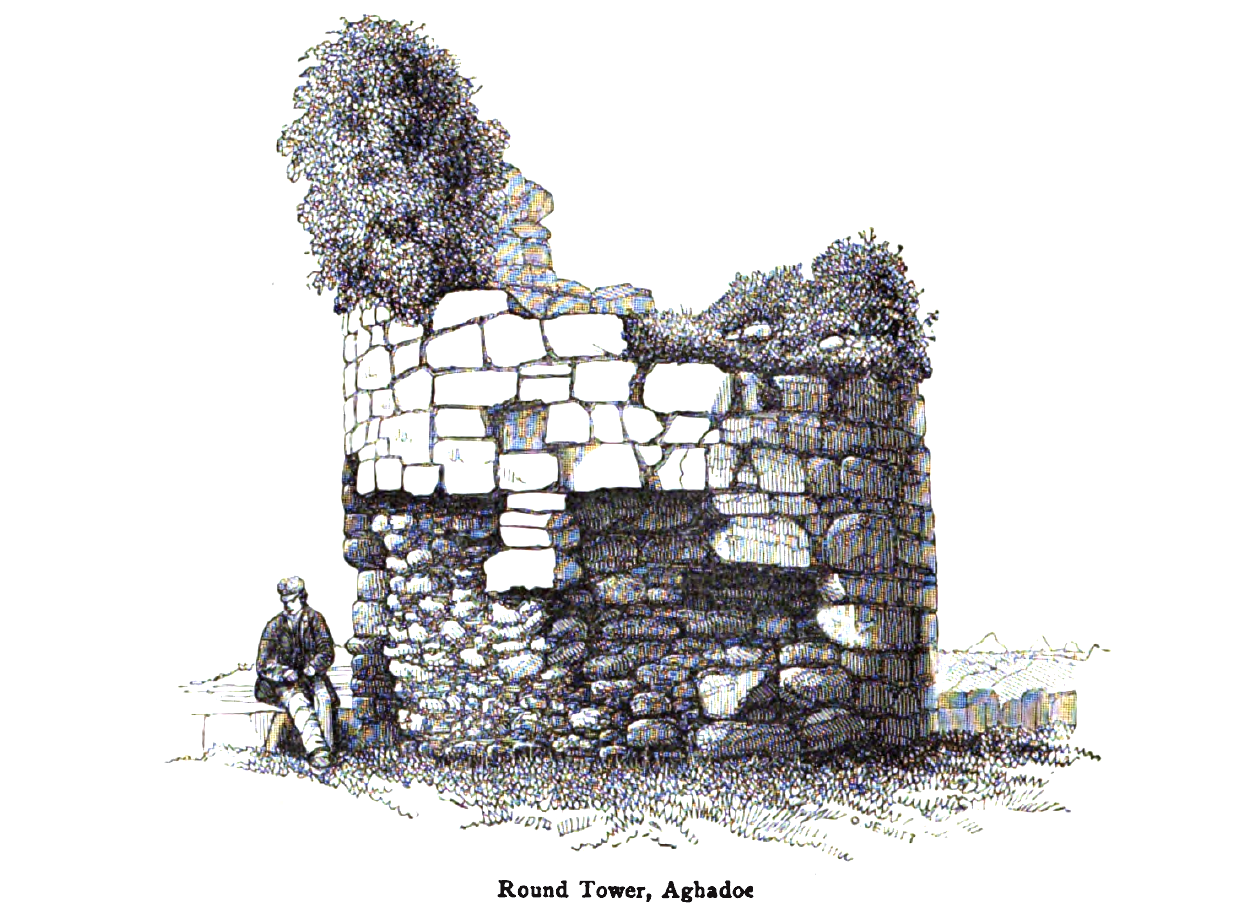
1892 sketch of the remains of the round tower
