= Maelsuthan Ua Cerbhail =

Maelsuthan Ua Cerbhail, Maelsuthain O'Carroll, or Maelsuthain O'Cearbhail (died 1010) was a political and academic figure in medieval Ireland. He was lord of the Eóganacht Locha Léin, advisor to High King Brian Boru, and an important scholar often credited for beginning the Annals of Innisfallen. Maelsuthan's academic reputation was considerable, earning him accolades like "chief doctor of the Western world in his time" and "sage of Ireland."

== Biography ==
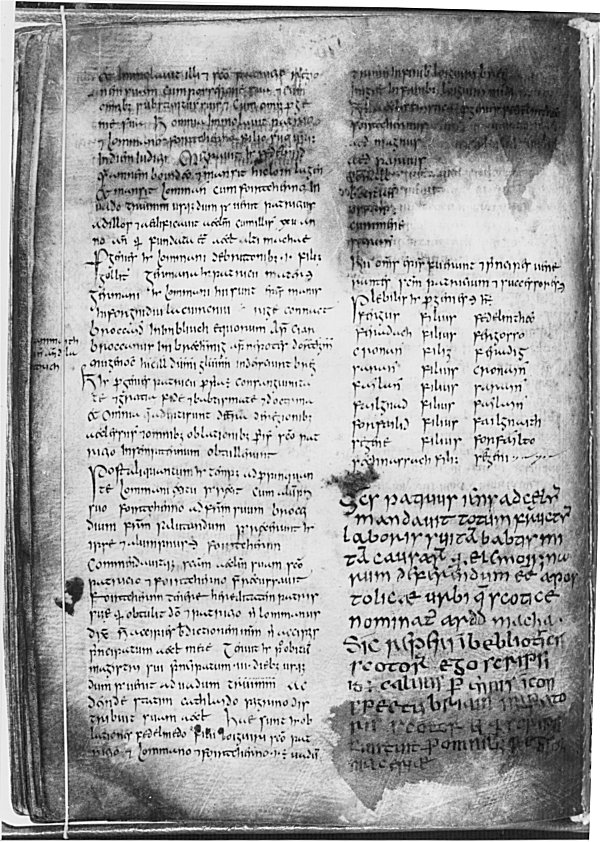
Page of the Book of Armagh with Maelsuthan's addition in the bottom right

Maelsuthan was a chief of the Eoghanacht of Loch Lein, a branch of a powerful southern Irish dynasty that settled around the Lakes of Killarney. He likely received his early education at the monastery on the island of Innisfallen and later became the school's head. There he oversaw the future king Brian's education at the monastery. Maelsuthan was Brian's anmchara (an advisor a confessor). After Brian won the kingship of Ireland, he went on a triumphal tour throughout the island. To secure the backing of the Church, he stopped in Armagh where he laid twenty ounces of gold on the altar of the cathedral and recognised the supremacy of Armagh over the other churches of Ireland. Maelsuthan accompanied the king during the trip (but this is contested by Denis Casey-) and documented the royal donation in the Book of Armagh.

St. Patrick, when going to heaven, ordained that all the fruit of his labour, as well of baptisms, as of causes and other alms, should be carried to the apostolic city, which in Irish is called Ardd-Macha. So I have found it in the libraries of the Scots. This I have written, that is, Calvus Perennis, in the sight of Brian, Emperor of the Scots, and what I have written he determined for all the kings of Maceria.

In the passage, still extant in Maelsuthan's own handwriting, Maelsuthan refers to himself as "Calvus Perennis" a translation of "ever-bald," the meaning of his Gaelic name. Maelsuthan also refers to "Maceria," the Latin for Cashel.

A poem by Maelsuthan is found in Geoffrey Keating's Foras Feasa ar Éirinn, as follows-

"Columcille said to the king that it was right to set aside many of the filés, as they were so numerous. But he advised him to maintain a filé as his own chief ollamh after the example of the kings who went before him, and that each provincial king should have an ollamh, and, moreover, that each lord of a cantred or district in Ireland should have an ollamh, and Columcille proposed this plan and Aodh assented to it; and it was to celebrate this benefit which Columcille conferred on the filés that Maolsuthain composed this stanza:

The filés were saved by this means

Through Colum of the fair law;

A filé for each district is no heavy charge.

It is what Colum ordained."

According to one observer, Maelsuthan may have been a Bishop of Aghadoe. Maelsuthain was interred in Aghadoe Cathedral, another sign he may have been that cathedral's bishop.

Multiple sources recorded Maelsuthan's death:

- Annals of Innisfallen, "Mael Suthain Ua Cerbaill {of Eóganacht}, eminent sage of Ireland, rested in Christ in Achad Deó."
- Annals of Ulster, "Mael Suthain ua Cerbaill, chief sage of Ireland, and king of Eóganacht of Loch Léin, Marcán son of Ceinnéitig, successor of Colum son of Cremthann and superior of Inis Celtra and Cell dá Lua, and Muiredach son of Mochloingse, superior of Mucnám, fell asleep in Christ.
- Annals of the Four Masters, "Maelsuthain Ua Cearbhaill, one of the family of Inis-Faithleann, chief doctor of the western world in his time, and lord of Eoghanacht of Loch-Lein, died after a good life.

Little historical documentation remains of Maelsuthan's life, but scholars have found a few legendary tales. One, translated from a 1434 manuscript, tells the story of Maelsuthan and three pupils who came from Ulster to be taught by Ireland's great sage. Maelsuthan teaches the students for three years after which the students tell their tutor that they want to take a pilgrimage to Jerusalem to walk the same paths as Christ. Maelsuthan asks for payment for his three years of instruction, and the students offer to stay for three-year to labour for him. Maelsuthan refuses the offer and tells the three that they will go on their pilgrimage and all three will die together. Maelsuthan demands that the three come to him and tell him when he will die and his fate in the afterlife. The three travel to the Holy Land, and Maelsuthan's prediction comes true. The three ask the Archangel Michael what will become of Maelsuthan's life and soul, and the angel replies that he will live for three and a half years and is damned for the sins of promiscuity, interpreting the holy scripture too loosely, and abandoning the Altus (an Irish hymn). The three fly to Maelsuthan in the form of doves and tell him what they learned. Maelsuthan repents. He had abandoned the Altus when his recitations of the hymn failed to save his son Maelpatrick from a deadly disease, but he promises to say the prayer seven times a night. He promises to interpret the holy scripture strictly, and offers three days of fasting a week and a hundred genuflections a day. After three years, the three students return to Maelsuthan and take him to the place he earned in Heaven.

== Works cited ==
- Curtis, Edmund (2002). A History of Ireland: from the earliest times to 1922. London: Routledge. ISBN 978-0-415-27949-9.
- "Early Irish Manuscripts of Munster." Journal of the Cork Historical and Archaeological Society. 1908
- Healy, John. Insula sanctorum et doctorum: or, Ireland's ancient schools and scholars. Sealy, Bryers & Walker, 1890
- "Innisfallen." The Monitor: An Illustrated Dublin Magazine. Vol. 2. Joseph Dollard: 1879.
- O'Curry, Eugune. "Lecture IV: The Ancient Annals (continued)." Lectures on the manuscript materials of ancient Irish history. William A. Hinch, 1878
- O'Donoghue, Denis (1899). "The Aghadoe Crozier". Journal of the Cork Historical and Archaeological Society. 5. Cork, Ireland: Cork Historical and Archaeological Society: 235–243.
