= Domhnall mac Briain =

Domhnall Mac Briain was the son of Brian Boru, the High king of Ireland and Eacraidh whose father was a Rí of a tuath in Mide. He had two known siblings, one brother (Tadc) and a sister. The Annals of Inisfallen record that he raided Cenél Conaill. Half of the army was led by Domhnall, while the other half by his half brother Murchad mac Briain.

He died in 1012 due to natural causes. He had no children.
