= Aghadoe =

- Townland
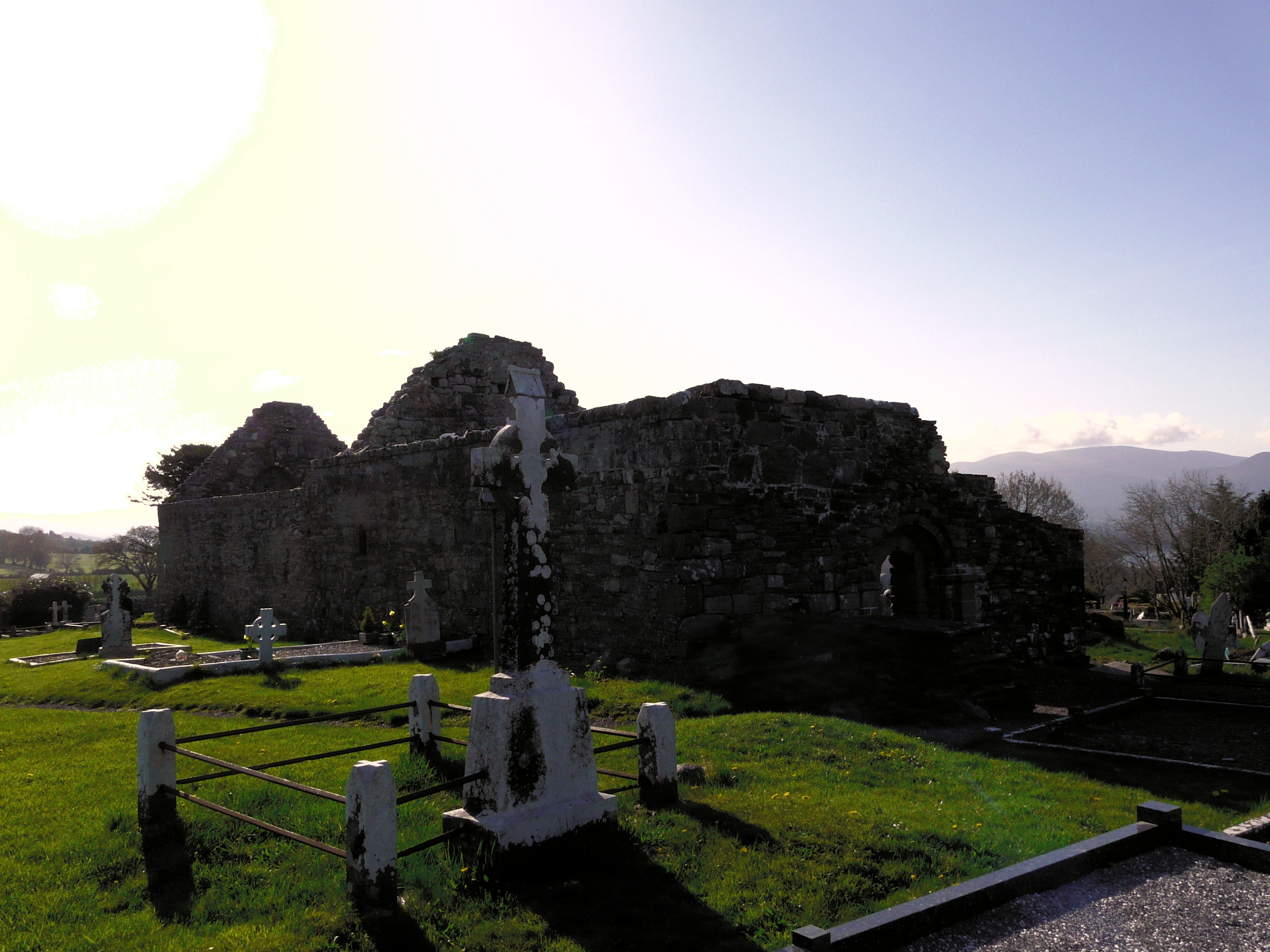
- Aghadoe Cathedral, from the northwest, in 2010

- Location within Ireland
- Coordinates: 52.0812°N 9.4707°W
- Country: Ireland
- County: County Kerry

Aghadoe (Irish: Achadh Deo or Achadh Dá Eó) is a large townland overlooking the town and lakes of Killarney in County Kerry, Ireland. Officially it is also a parish, although the parish is larger than the area normally associated with the name. The area is known for its views of the lakes and islands, including Innisfallen. The ruins of 13th century Parkavonear Castle and of Aghadoe Cathedral, an old Romanesque church in ruins, make the spot popular with tourists and archaeologists. Since 2015, Killarney RFC have their home ground in Aghadoe.

== History ==
Aghadoe takes its name from Achadh Dá Eó, which is Irish for "the place of the two yew trees".

During the Great Famine (1845–1852), the abbey or church of Aghadoe's churchyard was the designated burial site for famine and fever victims. London editor Charles Mackay travelled to Killarney in the summer of 1849 and notes that the churchyard itself was small (less than one acre), with a corner reserved for burials from Killarney's workhouse. It was "one of three where paupers are interred". From 1846 to 1849 Mackay estimates that close to 2,000 famine victims were buried at Aghadoe. They have "all [been] interred in one very small corner" of the cemetery. The "first glance shows the traveller in the midst of what a Golgotha he stands. In the wretched corner set apart for the paupers the earth is covered with deal planks and fresh remnants of coffins in shocking profusion".

=== Annalistic references ===
From the Annals of Inisfallen:

- AI939.1 Kl. Repose of Aed son of Mael Pátraic, abbot of Achad Deó.
- AI1010.5 Mael Suthain Ua Cerbaill {of Eóganacht}, eminent sage of Ireland, rested in Christ in Achad Deó.
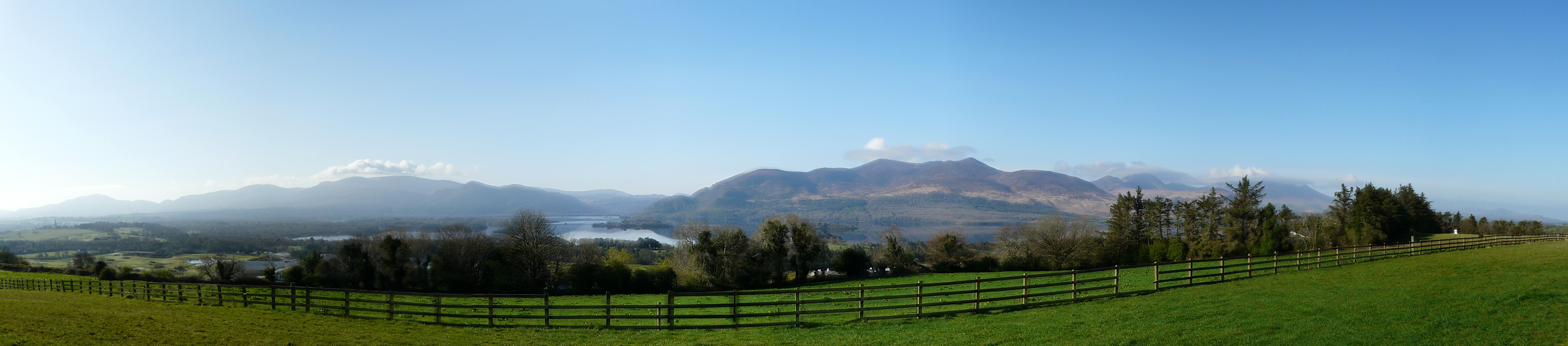
Panoramic view from Aghadoe

== See also ==
- List of abbeys and priories in Ireland (County Kerry)
