= Brian Boru =

Historical king of Ireland from 1002 to 1014

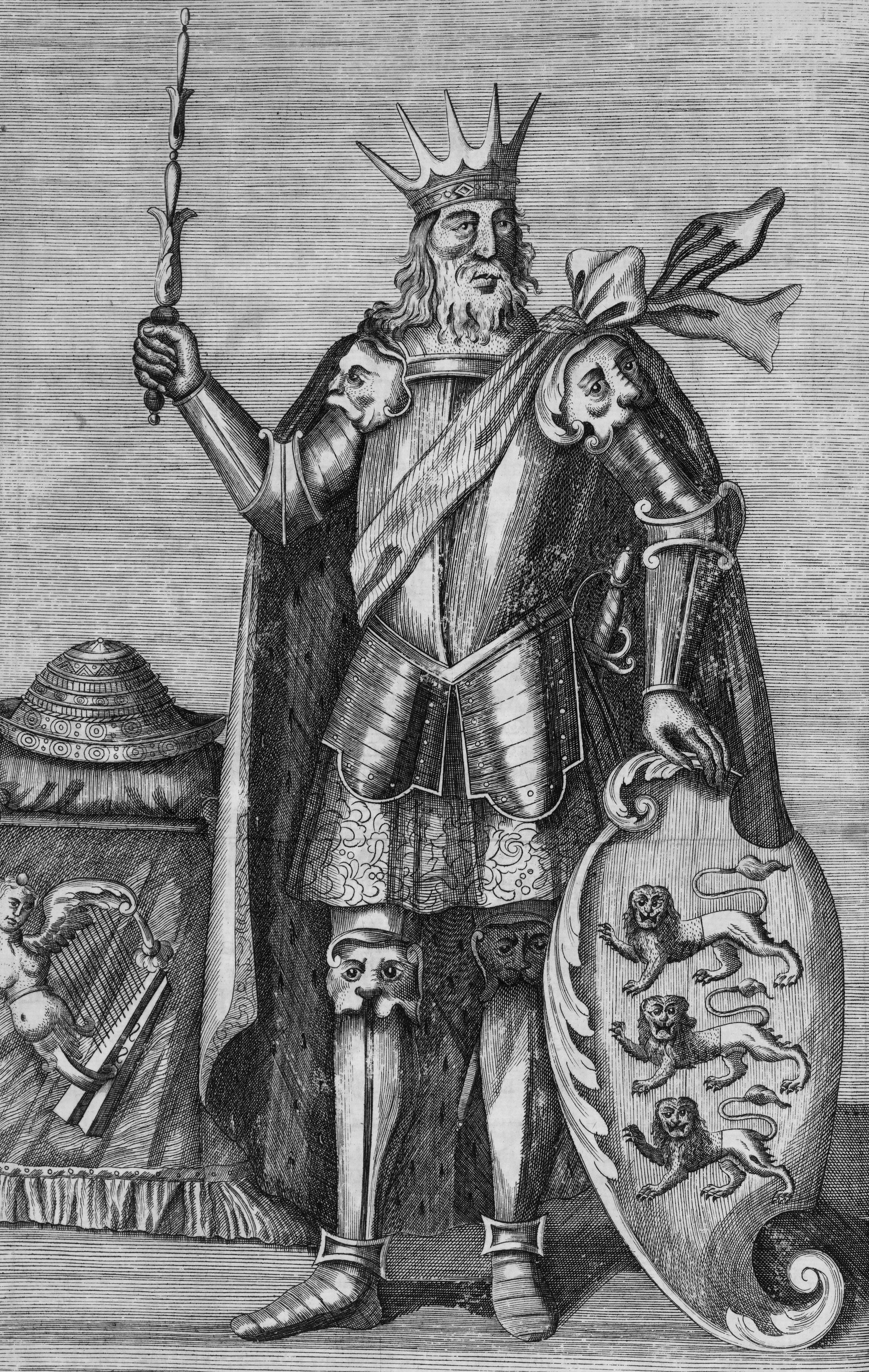
- One of the earliest depictions of Brian on the 1723 publication of Dermot O'Connor's translation of Foras Feasa ar Éirinn.

High King of Ireland
- Reign: 1002–1014
- Predecessor: Máel Sechnaill mac Domnaill
- Successor: Máel Sechnaill mac Domnaill (restored)

King of Munster
- Reign: 978–1014
- Predecessor: Máel Muad mac Brain
- Successor: Dúngal mac Máelfothartaig Hua Donnchada
- Born: c. 941; Kincora, Killaloe, Kingdom of Munster
- Died: 23 April 1014 (aged 72–73); Cluain Tarbh, Kingdom of Leinster
- Consort: Mór; Echrad; Gormflaith; Dub Choblaig
- Issue: Murchad; Conchobar; Flann; Tadc; Donnchad; Domhnall; Kerthialfad (adopted); Sadb; Bé Binn; Sláine
- House: O'Brien
- Father: Cennétig mac Lorcáin
- Mother: Bé Binn inion Urchadh
- Religion: Christian

Brian Boru (Middle Irish: Brian Bóruma mac Cennétig; modern Irish: Brian Bóramha; c. 941 – 23 April 1014) was the High King of Ireland from 1002 to 1014. He ended the domination of the High Kingship of Ireland by the Uí Néill dynasty and is responsible for ending Viking invasions of Ireland. Brian Boru is mentioned in the Annals of Inisfallen and in Chronicon Scotorum as "Brian mac Cennétig" (Brian, son of Cennétig). The name Brian of Bóruma or Brian Boru was given to him posthumously. Brian built on the achievements of his father, Cennétig mac Lorcain, and especially his elder brother, Mathgamain. Brian first made himself king of Munster, then subjugated Leinster, eventually becoming High King of Ireland. He was the founder of the O'Brien dynasty, and is widely regarded as one of the most successful and unifying monarchs in medieval Ireland.

With a population of under 500,000 people, Ireland had over 150 kings, with greater or lesser domains. The Uí Néill king Máel Sechnaill mac Domnaill, abandoned by his northern kinsmen of the Cenél nEógain and Cenél Conaill, acknowledged Brian as High King at Athlone in 1002. In the decade that followed, Brian campaigned against the northern Uí Néill, who refused to accept his claims; against Leinster, where resistance was frequent; and against the Norse-Gaelic Kingdom of Dublin. Brian was described in the Annals of Ulster as ardrí Gaidhel Erenn & Gall & Bretan, August iartair tuaiscirt Eorpa uile (High King of the Gaels of Ireland and the Norse foreigners and the Britons, Augustus of all north-western Europe), the only Irish king to receive that distinction in the annals.

Brian's hard-won authority was seriously challenged in 1013 when his ally Máel Sechnaill was attacked by the Cenél nEógain king Flaithbertach Ua Néill, with the Ulstermen as his allies. This was followed by further attacks on Máel Sechnaill by the Germanic Norsemen of Dublin under their Norse king Sigtrygg Silkbeard and the Leinstermen led by Máel Mórda mac Murchada. Brian campaigned against these enemies in 1013. In 1014, his armies confronted the armies of Leinster and Dublin. In the resulting Battle of Clontarf Brian was killed; nonetheless, his army was victorious against the Leinstermen and Norsemen. The battle is widely lauded as a pivotal moment in Irish history, and is well known in popular memory.

Brian was well regarded by contemporary chroniclers. The Norse-Gaels and Scandinavians also produced works mentioning Brian, including Njal's Saga, the Orkneyinga Saga, and the now-lost Brian's Saga. Brian's war against Máel Mórda and Sigtrygg was to be inextricably connected with his complicated marital relations, in particular his marriage to Gormlaith, Máel Mórda's sister and Sigtrygg's mother, who had been in turn the wife of Amlaíb Cuarán, king of Dublin and York, then of Máel Sechnaill, and finally of Brian himself.

== Family background ==
Brian Boru was one of the twelve sons of Cennétig mac Lorcáin (d. 951), who was King of Dál gCais and king of Tuadmumu (Thomond), modern County Clare, then a sub-kingdom in the north of Munster. Cennétig was described as rígdamna Caisil, meaning that he was either heir or candidate ("king material") to the kingship of Cashel or Munster, although this might be a later interpolation. Brian's mother was Bé Binn inion Urchadh, daughter of Urchadh mac Murchadh (d. 945), king of Maigh Seóla in west Connacht. That they belonged to the Uí Briúin Seóla may explain why he received the name Brian, which was rare among the Dál gCais.

Brian's family were descended from the Ui Tairdelbach branch of the Dal gCais (or Deis Tuisceart). This branch had recently taken power from the Ui Óengusso branch which had traditionally supplied the kings of the Dal gCais (also known as the Deisi Tuaiscirt). The Uí Toirdhealbhach had extended their influence over Thomond and in 925 the annals note that Ánrothán son of Máel Gorm assumed the kingship of Corco Mruad. In 934 Reabachán mac Mothla died and was named as "King of the Dál gCais" in the Annals (the earliest usage of this term). The same year of his death, his son Dub Gilla was killed by Brian's uncle Conghalach and Brian's grandfather Lorcáin is said to have succeeded to the kingship. He enjoyed a short reign before being succeeded by his own son Cinnéidigh who was the first King of Dál gCais to lead an army outside his own territory and lead an expedition as far north as Athlone. By his death in 951, he had been acknowledged as "King of Tuadmumu". His brother, Mathgamain, built on these achievements and was the first to capture Cashel and become King of Munster.

== Early life ==
Brian was born at Kincora, his father's residence or fort in Killaloe, a town in the region of Tuadmumu. Brian's posthumous cognomen "Bóruma" (anglicised as Boru) may have referred to "Béal Bóruma", a fort north of Killaloe, where the Dál gCais held sway. Another explanation, though possibly a late (re-)interpretation, is that the nickname represented Old Irish bóruma "of the cattle tribute", referring to his capacity as a powerful overlord.

As the youngest of twelve brothers, Brian was highly unlikely to be heir to his father's throne. When he was young, he was sent to a monastery to study Latin and the history of Ireland. He was taught at the monastery on the island of Innisfallen, near modern Killarney in County Kerry. His teacher or mentor was the noted monk, Maelsuthain Ua Cearbhaill, an Eóganacht chief who had become the head of the monastery, noted for starting the Annals of Inisfallen. Ua Cearbhaill would later become Brian's anmchara (advisor). However, when Brian was ten years old, he received news that his father had been killed in battle with the Vikings of Limerick, and he was brought home.

According to a biography of Brian, he once witnessed a raid on a Dal gCáis fort by the Vikings of Limerick. The fort was located on the banks of the River Shannon, allowing the Vikings to sail up the river from Limerick to attack it. According to the story, Brian, Mathgamain, and another older brother were on a hill or high ground near the fort tending to a herd of cattle. While they were there, they saw the raid from the mountainside after hearing screams and seeing smoke in the sky. They rushed down to the town, only to find the Vikings had already left. The settlement was burnt and looted. Brian's mother was killed, as were several of Brian's brothers who were defending the town, along with many of the townspeople. This event horrified Brian and had a lasting impact on him.

The River Shannon served as an easy route by which raids could be made against the provinces of Connacht and Meath. Both Brian's father, Cennétig mac Lorcáin, and his older brother Mathgamain had conducted river-borne raids, in which the young Brian would undoubtedly have participated. This may have been the root of his appreciation for naval forces in his later career.

When their father died, the kingship of Tuadmumu passed to Brian's older brother, Mathgamain. Brian and Mathgamain campaigned together throughout Munster. When Mathgamain was killed in 976, Brian replaced him. Subsequently, he became king of the entire kingdom of Munster.

== Reign of Mathgamain ==
In 964, Brian's older brother, Mathgamain, claimed control over the entire province of Munster by capturing the Rock of Cashel, capital of the ancient Eóganachta, the hereditary overlords or High Kings of Munster, but who in dynastic strife and with multiple assassinations had weakened themselves to the point they were now impotent. Earlier attacks from both the Uí Néill and Vikings were also factors. This situation allowed the illegitimate (from the Eóganacht perspective) but militarized Dál Cais to attempt to seize the provincial kingship. Mathgamain was never fully recognized and was opposed throughout his career in the 960s and 970s by Máel Muad mac Brain, a semi-outsider from the Cashel perspective but still a legitimate Eóganacht claimant from far south Munster.

In addition to Máel Muad, the Norse king Ivar of Limerick was a threat and may have been attempting to establish some overlordship in the province or a region of it himself, with the Cogad Gaedel re Gallaib even asserting he actually achieved this until routed by Mathgamain and Brian in the celebrated Battle of Sulcoit in 968.

Initially, Mathgamain had made peace with the Norse of Limerick. However, Brian was eager to avenge the deaths of his family members at the hands of the Vikings, and deserted with a band of his followers and launched a guerilla campaign against the Vikings from the mountains of Munster. They attacked Viking forts and patrols and survived with whatever food and weapons they found. Their attacks were successful in weakening the Vikings, but casualties began to mount and according to writings by Brian's scribe, just 15 men remained. However, at this point Mathgamain, inspired by the courage of his younger brother, decided to attack the Vikings with Brian and drive them from Limerick and Munster once and for all.

They gathered an army of kings from all over Munster, including their former enemy Maél Muad. They ambushed and routed the Norse at the Battle of Sulcoit. They followed up their victory by looting and burning Limerick. They killed every man of fighting age and enslaved the rest of the population.

This was the first of three battles which highlighted Brian's career. This victory was not decisive and eventually there grew up a brief alliance of sorts between Mathgamain, Máel Muad and others to drive the Norse "soldiers" or "officials" out of Munster and destroy their Limerick fortress in 972. The two Gaelic claimants were soon back to fighting and the fortuitous capture of Mathgamain in 976 by Donnubán mac Cathail allowed him to be effortlessly dispatched or murdered by Máel Muad, who would now rule as king of Cashel for two years.

== Early reign in Munster ==
Despite the death of Mathgamain, the Dál gCais remained a powerful force. Mathgamain was succeeded as King of Thomond by Brian, who quickly proved to be as fine a commander of armies as his brother was. After attacking and killing the much-weakened Ivar in the year 977, Brian pursued a new target, intending to eradicate the remaining Viking presence in Munster. Upon ascending to the throne, Imar, ruler or governor of the city of Limerick who was loyal to the now-slain Ivar, fled the city by ship down the River Shannon towards the Shannon estuary and took refuge in a monastery on Inis Cathaigh (Scattery Island), accompanied by his sons. However, in an act of revenge for the death of his brother, Brian set aside the sacred traditions and attacked the island with his troops, slaughtered the Vikings and desecrated the church.

Around the same time, in 978, Brian challenged Máel Muad to battle, and defeated him in the fateful Battle of Belach Lechta. Máel Muad was killed in the battle and afterwards the Eóganachta were no longer viable for the provincial Kingship, which was based upon lineage. Therefore, the Kingship of Munster passed to the Dál gCais, and Brian became king.

Afterwards, the last opposition remaining in Munster was an alliance consisting of the rebellious Irish led by Donnubán (Donovan), the man responsible for Mathgamain's death, and the remaining Norse/Viking forces, possibly led by Ivar's last remaining son and designated successor, Aralt (Harold). Brian attacked them at the Battle of Cathair Cuan, which may have been either a single battle or an extended conflict over the period 977–978. In any case, the event is mentioned in the Annals, and the later source the Cogadh describes Brian making a "great slaughter" of his enemies, killing both Donnubán and Aralt, and securing his position within the province.

However, he did allow some of the Norse to remain in their settlement, as they were wealthy and now central to trade in the region, particularly the slave trade, and possessed a fleet of great value, which Brian would utilise in his later naval expeditions.

Cian, the son of his brother Mathgamain's sworn enemy Máel Muad, later became a loyal ally of Brian and served under him in a number of campaigns. According to some accounts, Cian would later marry one of Brian's daughters, Sadbh (died 1048).

== Clashes with the High King ==
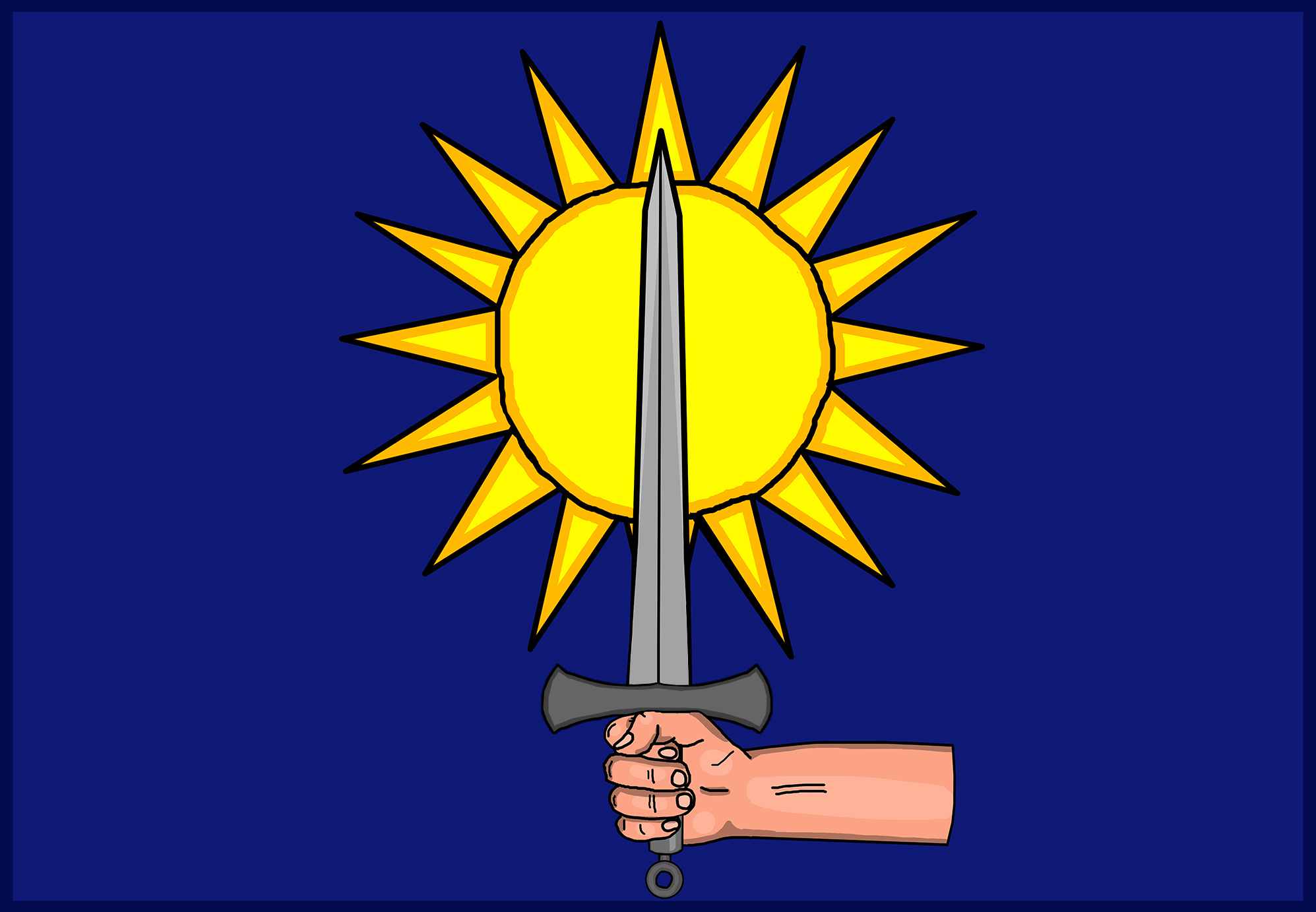
Banner reputedly used by Brian

Having established unchallenged rule over his home Province of Munster, Brian turned to extending his authority over the neighboring provinces of Leinster to the east and Connacht to the north-west. By doing so, he came into conflict with High King Máel Sechnaill mac Domnaill whose power base was the Province of Meath.

For the next fifteen years, from 982 to 997, High King Máel Sechnaill repeatedly led armies into Leinster and Munster, while Brian, like his father and brother before him, led his naval forces of around three hundred ships up the Shannon to attack Connacht and Meath on either side of the river. He suffered quite a few reverses in this struggle, but appears to have learned from his setbacks. He developed a military strategy that would serve him well throughout his career: the coordinated use of forces on both land and water, including on rivers and along Ireland's coast. Brian's naval forces, which included contingents supplied by the Hiberno-Norse cities that he brought under his control (particularly Waterford), provided both indirect and direct support for his forces on land. Indirect support involved a fleet making a diversionary attack on an enemy in a location far away from where Brian planned to strike with his army. Direct support involved naval forces acting as one arm in a strategic pincer, the army forming the other arm.

The conflict began in 982, when Brian was campaigning against the kingdom of Osraige. With Munster undefended, Maél Sechnaill attacked the Dál gCáis, destroying the sacred tree of Adair, under which many of the chiefs of the Dál gCáis had been crowned, including Brian's father Cénnetig, his brother Mathgamain and Brian himself. In response, Brian led an army into Westmeath where he plundered the land. Brian's fleet did suffer a setback when a squadron of his fleet attacked Connacht, where they killed a prince of Connacht, Muirgius, who was among the defenders. In retaliation, the Connachtmen attacked the ships, massacring the crews.

Mael Sechnaill launched a counter-offensive into Munster and in the ensuing battle he defeated the Dál gCáis, killing around six hundred men, including Brian's uncle. There was a period of relative peace between the two afterwards for about nine years, with Brian continuing to campaign elsewhere as he attempted to expand his power in the south and east.

Then in 993, Brian, now in control of much of Munster and gaining ground in Leinster, and unable to make significant progress against the High King on land, decided to utilise his naval superiority to attack Mael Sechnaill. His fleet sailed up the Shannon and invaded the Kingdom of Breifne, in what is now counties Leitrim and Cavan. In doing this, he put pressure on the High King as he was now open to attack from both north and south.

In 996, Brian finally managed to control the province of Leinster, which may have been what led Máel Sechnaill to reach a compromise with him in the following year. The two kings met at Bleanphottogue, on the banks of Lough Ree in County Fermanagh, where the agreement was made. By recognising Brian's authority over Leth Moga, that is, the Southern Half, which included the provinces of Munster and Leinster (and the Hiberno-Norse cities within them), Máel Sechnaill was simply accepting the reality that confronted him and retained control over Leth Cuinn, that is, the Northern Half, which consisted of the provinces of Meath, Connacht, and Ulster.

Precisely because he had submitted to Brian's authority, the king of Leinster was overthrown in 998 and replaced by Máel Mórda mac Murchada. Given the circumstances under which Máel Mórda had been appointed, it is not surprising that he launched an open rebellion against Brian's authority. With Leinster in rebellion, the kingdoms of both Brian and Mael Sechnaill were threatened, and thus they decided to briefly sideline their own conflict to defeat Leinster.

Brian assembled the forces of the province of Munster and Mael Sechnaill assembled those of Meath, with the intention of laying siege to the Hiberno-Norse city of Dublin, which was ruled by Máel Mórda's ally and cousin, Sigtrygg Silkbeard. Together Máel Mórda and Sigtrygg determined to meet Brian's army in battle rather than risk a siege. Thus, in 999, the opposing armies fought the Battle of Glenmama. The Irish annals all agree that this was a particularly fierce and bloody engagement, although claims that it lasted from morning until midnight, or that the combined Leinster-Dublin force lost 4,000 killed are open to question. In any case, Brian followed up his victory, as he and his brother had in the aftermath of the Battle of Sulcoit thirty-two years before, by capturing and sacking the enemy's city.

Sigtrygg fled the city, seeking support from kings in Ulster, but he was turned away by the Ulaid, leaving Sigtrygg few options but to return to Dublin and submit to Brian. Once again, Brian opted for reconciliation; he requested that Sigtrygg return and resume his position as ruler of Dublin, giving Sigtrygg the hand of one of his daughters in marriage, just as he had with the Eoganacht king, Cian. It may have been on this occasion that Brian married Sigtrygg's mother and Máel Mórda's sister Gormflaith, the former wife of Máel Sechnaill.

== Struggle for Ireland ==
Brian made it clear that his ambitions had not been satisfied by the compromise of 997 when, in the year 1000, he led a combined Munster-Leinster-Dublin army in an attack on High King Máel Sechnaill mac Domnaill's home province of Meath. The struggle over who would control all of Ireland was renewed. Máel Sechnaill's most important ally was the king of Connacht, Cathal mac Conchobar mac Taidg, but this presented a number of problems. The provinces of Meath and Connacht were separated by the Shannon River, which served as both a route by which Brian's naval forces could attack the shores of either province and as a barrier to the two rulers providing mutual support for each other. Máel Sechnaill came up with an ingenious solution; two bridges would be erected across the Shannon. These bridges would serve as both obstacles preventing Brian's fleet from traveling up the Shannon and a means by which the armies of the provinces of Meath and Connacht could cross over into each other's kingdoms.

The Annals state that, in the year 1002, Máel Sechnaill surrendered his title to Brian, although they do not say anything about how or why this came about. The Cogadh Gaedhil re Gallaibh provides a story in which Brian challenges High King Máel Sechnaill to a battle at the Hill of Tara in the province of Meath, but the High King requests a month-long truce so that he can mobilise his forces, which Brian grants him. Máel Sechnaill fails to rally the regional rulers who are nominally his subordinates by the time the deadline arrives, and he is forced to surrender his title to Brian.

There have been some doubts expressed about this explanation, given Brian's style of engaging in war; if he had found his opponent at a disadvantage it is most likely he would have taken full advantage of it rather than allowing his enemy the time to even the odds. Also, given the length and intensity of the struggle between Máel Sechnaill and Brian, it seems unlikely that the High King would surrender his title without a fight. In any case, it is generally accepted that in 1002 Brian became the new High King of Ireland.

== High kingship ==
Brian, then in his 60s, spent the next decade or so of his life subjugating and accepting the submissions of the last of the lesser kingdoms and regions which had not already submitted to him. Those campaigns included two full circuits of the island in 1005 and 1006, demonstrating his determination and energy despite his age.

Unlike some who had previously held the title, Brian intended to be High King in more than name. To accomplish that, he needed to impose his will upon the regional rulers of the only province that did not already recognise his authority, Ulster. The kingdoms of the northern Uí Néill and Ulaid were some of the most powerful in Ireland, and it took Brian considerable time and resources to subdue them.

=== Ulster campaigns ===
Ulster's geography presented a formidable challenge. There were three main routes by which an invading army could enter the province, and all three favoured the defenders. Brian first had to find a means of getting through or around these defensive choke points and then he had to subdue the fiercely independent regional kings of Ulster. It took Brian ten years of campaigning to achieve his goal, which, considering that he could and did call on all of the military forces of the rest of Ireland, indicates how formidable the kings of Ulster were.

Brian received naval support throughout his northern campaigns from Sigtrygg Silkbeard of Dublin. Silkbeard was eager to enact revenge against the Ulaid for when they refused to assist him after he was forced out of his kingdom of Dublin by Brian following the Battle of Glenmama in 999, forcing Silkbeard to return to Dublin and submit to him.

Brian was also greatly helped by the fact that two years before his first campaign in Ulster, in the year 1003, the brutal battle of Craeb Telcha had taken place between the Northern Uí Néill and the Ulaid, in which the king of the Cenél Eoghain and of the Uí Neill was killed and most of the Ulaid royal bloodline was wiped out, with the Uí Néill gaining victory. This then led to a bloody war of succession within and between the clans of the Ulaid, and together with further attacks from the Uí Néill, which led to the kingdom's being severely weakened. Brian accepted the submission of the Cenel Eoghain king in 1005 and later accepted the submission of many of the Ulaid clans at a sacred Ulaid site, Emain Macha.

However Flaithbertaigh Ua Néill, the new king of the Northern Uí Néill and of the Cenél Eoghan, although having already submitted to Brian, was apparently unwilling to accept fully the High King's authority, and was quite rebellious. He was known for his continued aggression towards his neighbours despite previously accepting Brian's rule. In 1005, after Brian had departed Ulster, he attempted to exert his overlordship over the Ulaid, and seemingly wanted to punish them for submitting to Brian, to which the Northern Uí Néill were vehemently opposed. He attacked the kingdom, killing several kings and princes of the Ulaid. He also took several hostages.

This caused Brian to return in 1006 and again in 1007 to deal with Flaithbertach. On the latter occasion, he removed the hostages of the Ulaid from Flaithbertach's custody and took them into his own custody (according to the Annals of Inisfallen, Brian had to take the hostages forcefully). Flaithbertaigh again submitted, and also married one of Brian's daughters, Bé Binn.

Despite this, Brian continued to be troubled by the rebellious Flaithbertaigh. In the year 1009, Flaithbertaigh blinded and then executed the king of the Cenél Chonaill. Later that year he would also launch raids in the Midlands going as far south as the River Boyne. This led to Brian's return to Ulster yet again, this time taking hostages from the Cenél Eoghain back to his home province, finally gaining the proper submission of Flaithbertaigh.

Flaithbertaigh would then take part in campaigns against the Cenél Chonaill, the final kingdom yet to submit to Brian, in the year 1011 alongside Brian's sons Murchad and Domnall. However, they were unsuccessful in gaining the submission of the Cenél Chonaill. Brian then personally proceeded to lead a second invasion later that year, this time successfully subjugating and receiving the submission of the Cenél Chonaill. While Flaithbertaigh would continue attacking the Ulaid and Cenél Chonaill in late 1011 and in 1012, for the time he was no longer of any threat to Brian.

Throughout his campaigns in the province, it was once again Brian's coordinated use of forces on land and at sea that allowed him to triumph; while the rulers of Ulster could bring the advance of Brian's army to a halt, they could not prevent his fleet from attacking the shores of their kingdoms. Once Brian entered the province of Ulster, he systematically defeated each of the regional rulers who defied him, forcing them to recognise him as their overlord.

It was during this process that Brian pursued an alternative means of consolidating his control, not merely over the province of Ulster, but over Ireland as a whole. In contrast to its structure elsewhere, the Church in Ireland was not centred around dioceses and archdioceses, but rather around monasteries headed by powerful abbots who were members of the royal dynasties of the lands in which their monasteries resided. Among the most important monasteries was Armagh, located in the province of Ulster.

Brian's advisor, Maelsuthain O'Carroll, documented in the Book of Armagh that, in the year 1005, Brian donated 22 ounces of gold to this monastery and declared that Armagh was the religious capital of Ireland, to which all other monasteries should send the funds they collected. This was a clever move, for the supremacy of the monastery of Armagh would last only so long as Brian remained the High King. Therefore, it was in the interest of Armagh to support Brian with all their wealth and power.

Brian is not referred to in the passage from the Book of Armagh as the Ard Rí—that is, High King—but rather he is declared Imperator Scotorum, 'Emperor of the Gaels'.

Though it is only speculation, it has been suggested that Brian and the Church in Ireland were together seeking to establish a new form of kingship in Ireland, one that was modelled after the kingships of England and France, in which there were no lesser ranks of regional kings—simply one king who had (or sought to have) power over all others in a unitary state. In any case, whether as high king or emperor, by 1011 all of the regional rulers in Ireland acknowledged Brian's authority. No sooner had Brian achieved this before it was lost again.

=== Rebellion in Leinster ===
Máel Mórda mac Murchada of Leinster had only accepted Brian's authority grudgingly, and in 1012 he rose in rebellion. The Cogadh Gaedhil re Gallaibh relates a story in which one of Brian's sons insults Máel Mórda, which leads him to declare his independence from Brian's authority and attack his neighbours.

Another possible reason was that the kings of Leinster and Dublin believed Maél Sechnaill was weak and that the Kingdom of Meath was vulnerable. This was because Flaithbertaigh Uí Néill, king of the Cenél Eoghain and the northern Uí Néill, was again becoming troublesome for Brian. In 1013, he raided the Midlands, bringing him into direct conflict with Maél Sechnaill who was the king of Meath. The two armies had a stand-off near Kells, but Maél Sechnaill retreated for unknown reasons before any battle could occur. This led to the belief in Leinster that Meath was vulnerable, which would also weaken Brian if Leinster could knock one of his allies out of any conflict.

Whatever the actual reason was, Máel Mórda sought allies with which to defy the High King. He found one in Flaithbertach Uí Neill in Ulster who had only recently submitted to Brian. Together, they attacked the province of Meath (again), where the former High King Máel Sechnaill sought Brian's help to defend his kingdom.

In 1013, Brian led a force from his own province of Munster and from southern Connacht into Leinster, and a detachment under his son, Murchad, ravaged the southern half of the province of Leinster for three months. The forces under Murchad and Brian were reunited on 9 September outside the walls of Dublin. The city was blockaded by Brian's fleet, but it was the High King's army that ran out of supplies first, so that Brian was forced to abandon the siege and return to Munster around Christmas.

=== Battle of Clontarf ===
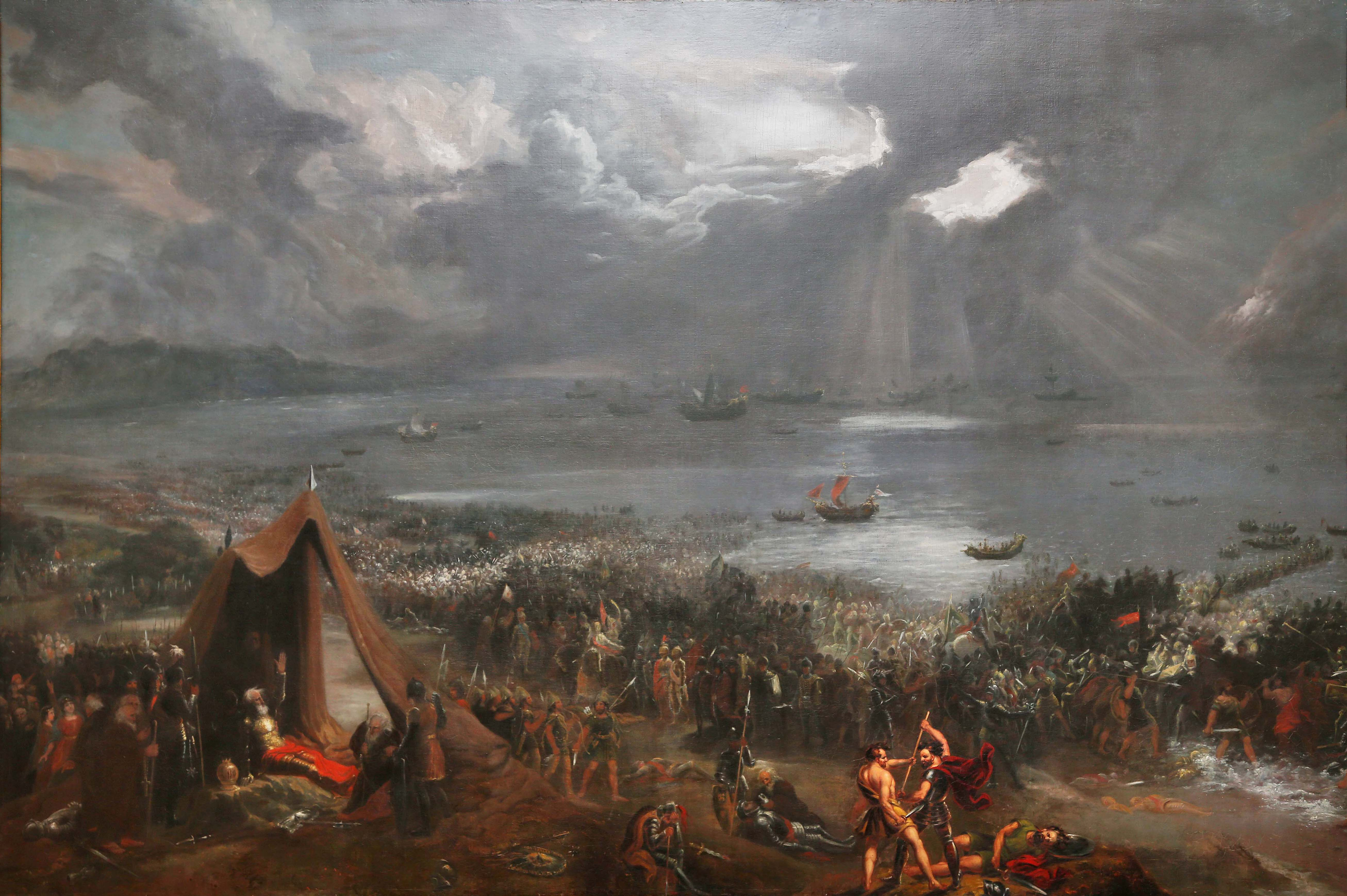
Oil painting of Battle of Clontarf by Hugh Frazer 1826

Máel Mórda was aware that the High King would return to Dublin in 1014 to try once more to defeat him. He may have hoped that by defying Brian, he could enlist the aid of all the other regional rulers. If so, he was sorely disappointed. The province of Connacht and most of the province of Ulster failed to support either side of the conflict, with the exception of Flaithbertach Ua Néill of the northern Uí Néill who sent troops to Máel Mórda. His inability to obtain troops from any rulers in Ireland may explain why Máel Mórda sought support from rulers outside Ireland, sending his subordinate and nephew, Sigtrygg, the ruler of Dublin, overseas to do so.

Sigtrygg sailed to Orkney, and on his return stopped at the Isle of Man. These islands had been occupied by the Vikings long before and the Hiberno-Norse had close ties with Orkney and the Isle of Man. There was even a precedent for employing Norsemen from the isles; they had been used by Sigtrygg's father, Amlaíb Cuarán, in 980, and by Sigtrygg himself in 990. Their incentive to fight was loot, not land.

It has been argued that, contrary to the assertions made in the Cogadh Gaedhil re Gallaibh, this was not an attempt by the Vikings to reconquer Ireland. All of the Norsemen, both the Norse-Gaels of Dublin and the Norsemen from the Isles, were in the service of Máel Mórda. The High King had 'Vikings' in his army as well: the Hiberno-Norse of Limerick and probably those of Waterford, Wexford, and Cork as well. Some sources include a rival gang of Norse mercenaries from the Isle of Man, led by Brodir's own brother, Óspak. The two brothers would go on to fight on opposite sides in the battle. Some scholars argue that, essentially, this conflict was an Irish civil war with minor foreign participation. However, the revisionist idea of Brian Boru's campaign and the battle of Clontarf being more akin to a civil war than an international war between the Irish and Norsemen has recently been challenged by researchers from the Universities of Coventry, Oxford and Sheffield. Using network analysis to mathematically analyze the medieval text, they found over 1000 relationships between about 300 characters; as such, the traditional view may be more accurate after all.

Along with whatever troops he obtained from abroad, Brian mustered troops from his home province of Munster, southern Connacht, and the province of Meath, the latter contingent commanded by his old rival Máel Sechnaill mac Domnaill. Brian's army may have outnumbered Máel Mórda's, since Brian felt secure enough to dispatch a mounted detachment under the command of his youngest son, Donnchad, to raid southern Leinster, presumably hoping to force Máel Mórda to release his contingents from there to return to defend their homes.

Brian was also joined by the aforementioned Óspak, a Norseman, brother of Brodir. Initially the two brothers sailed from the Isle of Man to fight against Brian with the Leinster forces. However, after a disagreement, Brodir planned to kill Óspak and his men the next morning. Óspak and his soldiers then fled during the night with 10 ships and sailed around Ireland to Connacht, where Óspak converted to Christianity and swore allegiance to Brian. He fought on the opposite side to his brother at the battle.

Brian and Máel Sechnaill sent their forces to torch and plunder much of the countryside and hinterland north of Clontarf as far as the Howth Peninsula. However, in one of their raids, one of Máel Sechnaill's sons, Flann, was killed when a raiding party he was leading was ambushed by the Norse, with a total of over 150 Irish killed.

A disagreement between Brian and Máel Sechnaill resulted in the latter withdrawing his support. Brian sent a messenger to find Donnchad and ask him to return with his detachment, but the call for help came too late. To compound Brian's problems, Máel Mórda's Norse contingents, led by Sigurd Hlodvirsson, Earl of Orkney, and Brodir of the Isle of Man, arrived on Palm Sunday, 18 April. The battle occurred five days later, on Good Friday, 23 April 1014, just north of the city of Dublin, at Clontarf.

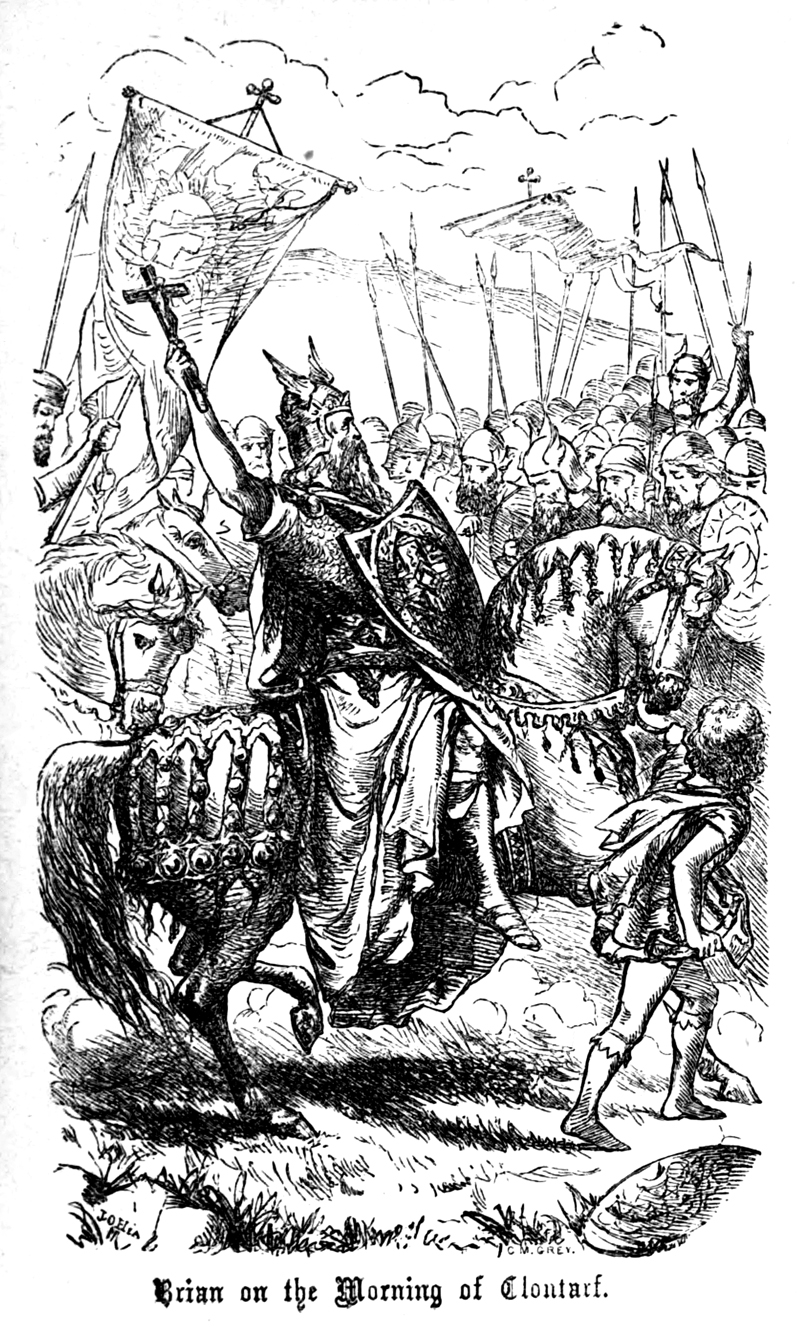
Brian on the Morning of Clontarf

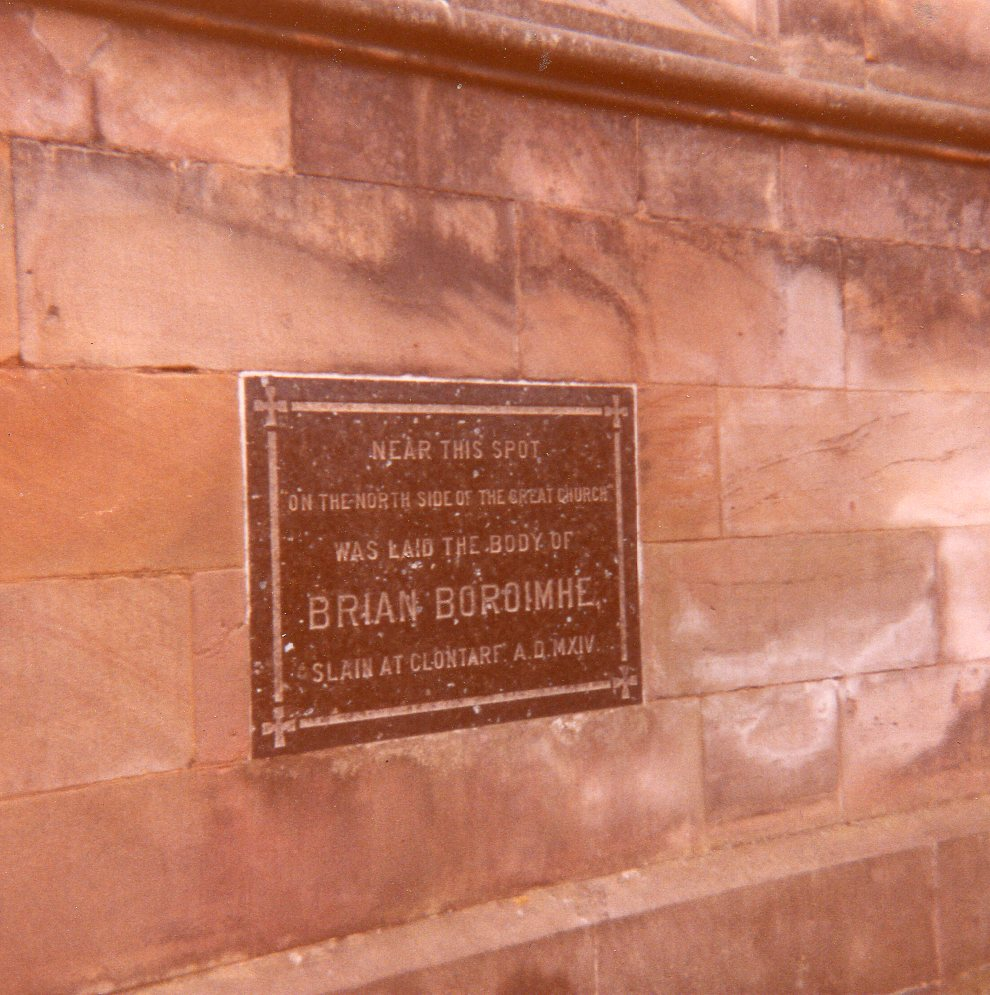
Plaque at Brian Boru's burial place in St. Patrick's Cathedral, (COI), Armagh

All of the accounts state that the Battle of Clontarf lasted all day, but this may be an exaggeration. The fighting was incredibly bloody by all accounts. Brian's army, however, eventually broke the enemy line and the Vikings attempted to flee for their ships which were in the bay. However at this time the tide came in and many of them drowned attempting to swim for their ships as they were relentlessly pursued by the Irish.

Brian's Irish army won partly through a small numerical advantage, and the use of small spears which they threw at the enemy. According to one account, Maél Sechnaill had a change of heart and arrived late to the battle and, after the death of Brian, led the Irish army and completed the rout.

Apart from Brian himself, much of the Irish royal bloodline was wiped out in the battle. The king's son and heir, Murchad, was killed. According to one account he killed over 100 enemies, but the details of his own death are unknown. He died shortly after the Viking line broke.

Brian's grandson and Murchad's son Toirdelbach was also killed. Aged 15, he led the Irish infantry pursuing the Vikings as they fled to the sea. He was knocked over by a wave, knocking him unconscious after hitting his head, and he drowned.

On the Leinster and Viking side, many were also killed. Maél Morda was killed in the fighting. Sigurd the Stout of Orkney was also killed by Murchad. Brodir, who likely killed Brian, was captured and executed after the battle.

== Death ==
There are many accounts of how Brian was killed. Some suggest he was killed during heroic man-to-man combat, although others specify that he was not involved in the battle due to his advanced age and frailty. According to the Cogadh Gaedhel re Gallaibh, the elderly Brian Boru spent the day before his death away from combat, kneeling upon a cushion. He was killed by fleeing Viking mercenaries shortly after learning from his attendant that, despite his forces having won a great victory, his son Murchadh's standard had just fallen.

The most common accounts attribute the killing of Brian Boru to the Viking mercenary Brodir of the Isle of Man while praying in his tent at Clontarf. According to the 12th century Cogad Gáedel re Gallaib, Brian was visited in a dream on the night prior to the battle by a Pre-Christian goddess from the Irish mythology named Aibell. Aibell had been demoted since St Patrick to a Fairy Queen ruling over the Celtic Otherworld of Thomond and was traditionally considered the guardian spirit, protectress, and the banshee of King Brian's clan and dynasty. In the dream, Aibell is said to have warned Brian of his impending death and further prophesied that whichever of his sons he saw first in the morning would succeed him. Believing that the dream predicted his destiny and also, it is implied, not wishing to outlive his son Murchadh, Brian refused to seek shelter from the retreating Vikings and even chose to dismiss his bodyguards at the critical moment.

The Cogadh Gaedhel re Gallaibh alleges that when Brian Boru and Brodir came face to face, similarly to Hamlet and Laertes, all they accomplished was to kill each other. According to Njáls saga, on the other hand, Brodir was captured almost immediately afterwards and brutally tortured to death by Ulf the Quarrelsome, a bodyguard and possibly a relative through marriage of Brian and who was fiercely loyal to the late king. Brodir's stomach was first slashed open with a sword, his intestines were then tied to a tree, and Brodir was forced to walk around and around the tree resulting in a slow and excruciating death from both blood loss and disembowelling.

After his death, Brian's body was taken, as he had instructed moments before Brodir's arrival, for his Requiem Mass to the church upon Spittal Hill, in what is now Swords, County Dublin and then to Armagh to be buried in the Cathedral founded by St Patrick. His tomb is said to be in the north wall of St Patrick's Cathedral in the city of Armagh.

There have been further reports that the body of Brian Boru was brought back to his homeland in Munster after his death. While passing an area named Graine, located outside Urlingford on the Leinster/Munster border, Brian's army was attacked and his corpse was tied against a tree to pretend he was directing the army. In later years, artefacts—swords and clothing—strongly suggest that his army was in this area. Graine hill today has a wall which separates the two provinces and a narrow road still exists which used to be the main road connecting the diocese of Ossory and Cashel.

Brian was succeeded as High King of Ireland by his former enemy, and later ally, Máel Sechnaill (Malachy Mór), who regained the title which he had previously lost to Brian many years before. He ruled until his death in 1022.

== Historical view ==
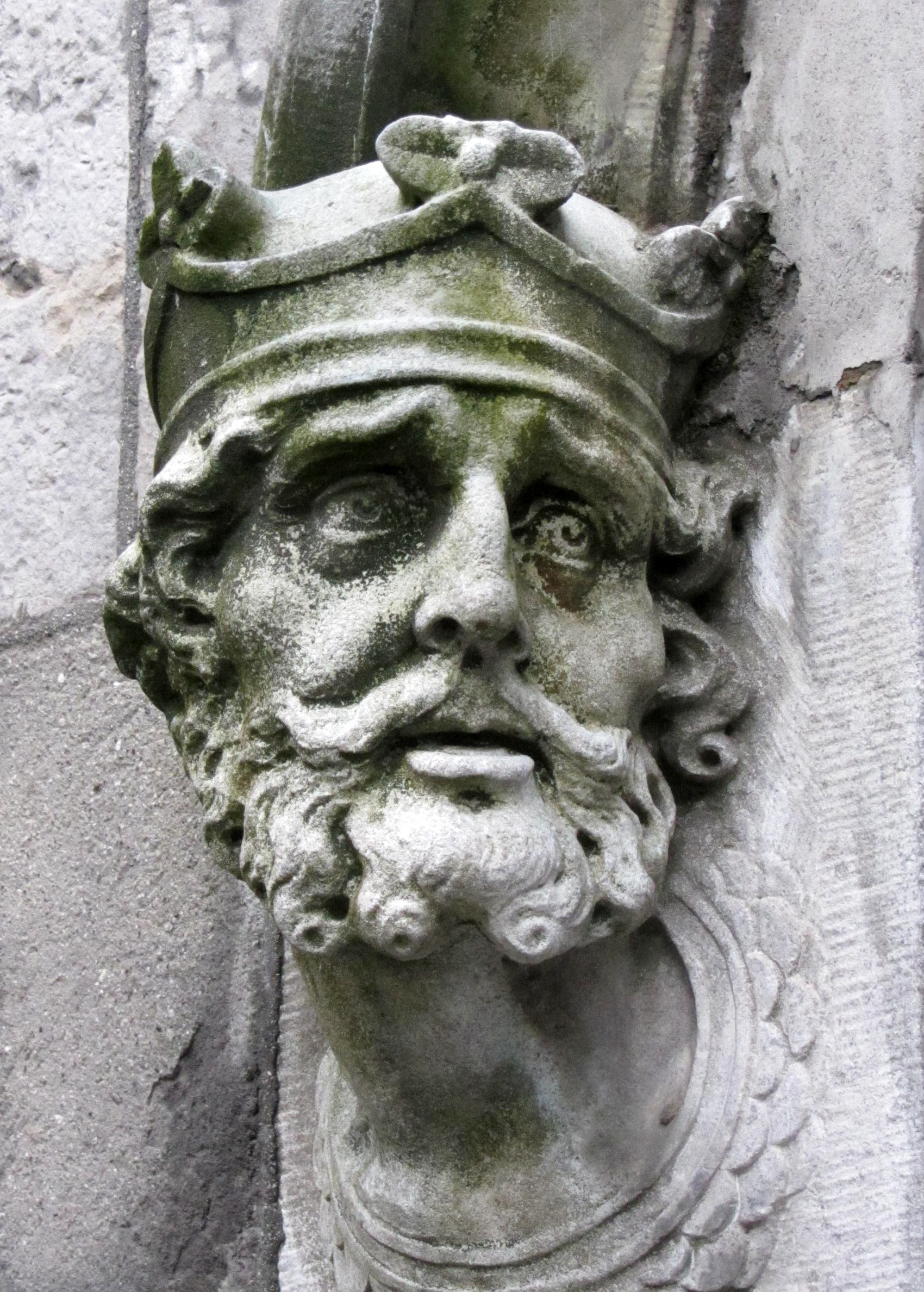
Sculpture outside Chapel Royal.

For the last 250 years there has been a debate among historians about Ireland's Viking age and the Battle of Clontarf. The standard, and "popular", view, is that the battle ended a war between the Irish and Vikings by which Brian Boru broke Viking power in Ireland. However, revisionist historians see it as an Irish civil war in which Brian Boru's Munster and its allies defeated Leinster and Dublin, and that there were Vikings fighting on both sides. In January 2018 researchers from the Universities of Coventry, Oxford and Sheffield, led by Coventry University professor Ralph Kenna, a theoretical physicist, published a paper in the journal Royal Society Open Science that used network science to mathematically analyse the 12th-century Cogadh Gáedhel re Gallaibh ("The War of the Gaels with the Foreigners", i.e. the Danes and other Norsemen), that listed over 1000 relationships between about 300 characters, and concluded that the standard and popular view of the war between the Irish and Germanic Norsemen was broadly correct, but that the picture was nevertheless more complex than "a fully 'clear-cut' Irish versus Viking conflict". However one of the paper's co-authors, PhD student Joseph Yose, added that "Our statistical analysis ... cannot decisively resolve the debate".

The revisionist theory is that the popular image of Brian—the ruler who managed to unify the regional leaders of Ireland so as to free the land from a 'Danish' (Viking) occupation—originates from the powerful influence of the Cogadh Gaedhil re Gallaibh, in which Brian takes the leading role. This work is thought to have been commissioned by Brian's great-grandson Muirchertach Ua Briain as a means of justifying the Ua Briain claim to the High Kingship, a title upon which the Uí Neill had had a near-monopoly. Recent research has suggested that it might have been commissioned by Muirchertach's contemporary and cousin, Brian Glinne Maidhir, or at least someone favourable to the line descended from Brian's son, Donnchad.

The influence of this book on both scholarly and popular authors cannot be exaggerated. Until the 1970s most scholarly writing concerning the Vikings' activities in Ireland, as well as the career of Brian Boru, accepted the claims of Cogadh Gaedhil re Gallaibh at face value.

While Brian may not have freed Ireland from a Norse (Viking) occupation, simply because it was never entirely conquered by the Vikings, his rule saw consistent conflict against Vikings and Viking-founded settlements, the latter all having been founded to give raiders easier access to the interior of Ireland. In the last decade of the 8th century, Norse raiders began attacking targets in Ireland and, beginning in the mid-9th century, these raiders established the fortified camps that later grew into Ireland's first cities: Dublin, Limerick, Waterford, Wexford, and Cork. Within only a few generations, some Norse had converted to Christianity, intermarried with the Irish, and had often adopted the Irish language, dress and customs, thus becoming what historians refer to as the Hiberno-Norse.

Such Hiberno-Norse cities occupied a tenuous position within Ireland's political scene long before the birth of Brian. They often suffered attacks from Irish rulers, and made alliances with others. The Norse, who initially attacked and subsequently settled in Ireland, were partially assimilated by the Irish. However, Brian's father was likely slain by the Norse of Limerick and he himself died during a revolt that was supported by multiple Viking leaders, specifically the Norse of Mann.

== Wives and children ==
Brian's first wife was Mór, daughter of the king of Uí Fiachrach Aidne of Connacht. She is said to have been the mother of his sons Murchad, Conchobar and Flann. Later genealogies claimed that these sons left no descendants, although in fact Murchad's son Tairrdelbach is recorded as being killed at Clontarf along with his father and grandfather.

Another wife, Echrad, was a daughter of Carlus mac Ailella, king of Uí Áeda Odba, an obscure branch of the southern Uí Néill. She was the mother of Brian's son Tadc, whose son Toirdelbach and grandson Muirchertach rivalled Brian in power and fame.

Brian's most famous marriage was with Gormflaith, sister of Máel Mórda of Leinster. Donnchad, who had his half-brother Tadc killed in 1023 and ruled Munster for 40 years thereafter, was the result of this union.

Brian had a sixth son, Domnall. Although he predeceased his father, Domnall apparently had at least one surviving child, a son whose name is not recorded. Domnall may perhaps have been the son of Brian's fourth known wife, Dub Choblaig, who died in 1009. She was a daughter of King Cathal mac Conchobar mac Taidg of Connacht.

Brian had at least three daughters, but their mothers are not recorded. Sadb, whose death in 1048 is recorded by the Annals of Innisfallen, was married to Cian, son of Máel Muad mac Brain. Bé Binn was married to the northern Uí Néill king Flaithbertach Ua Néill. A third daughter, Sláine, was married to Brian's stepson Sigtrygg Silkbeard of Dublin.

According to Njal's Saga, he had a foster-son named Kerthialfad.

== Family heritage ==
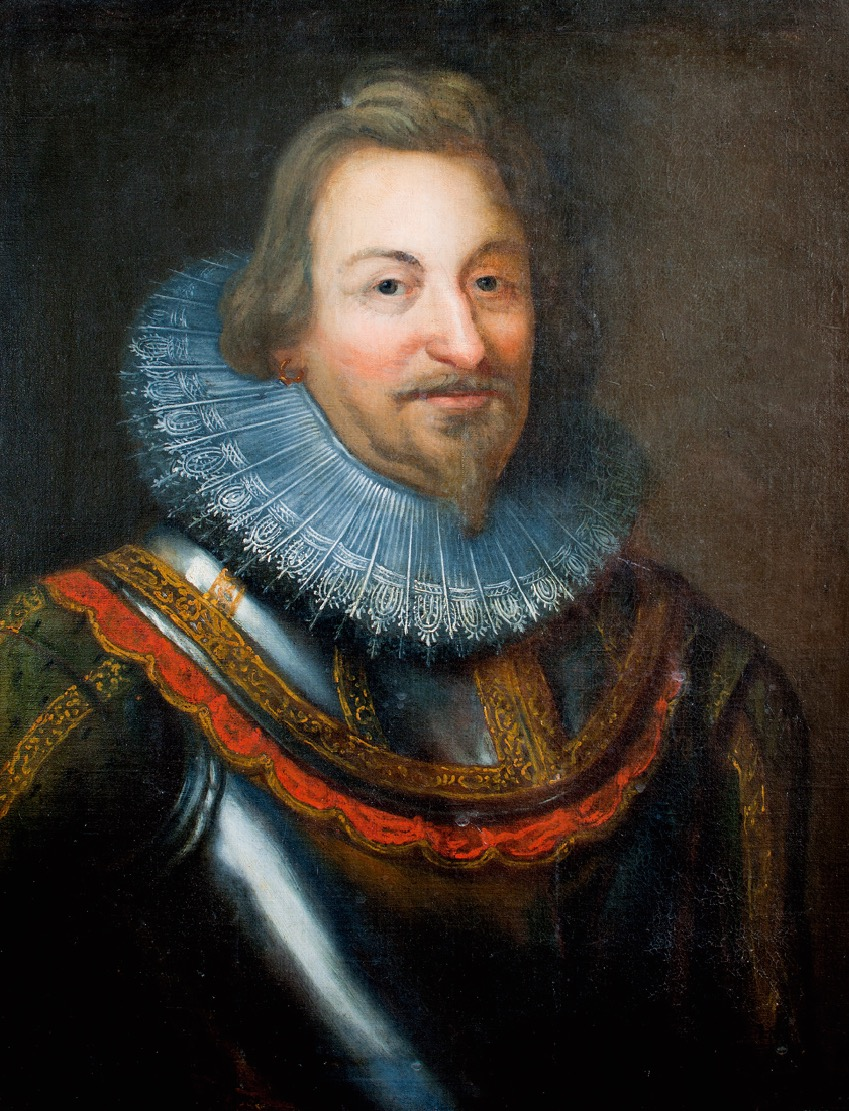
Donough O'Brien, 4th Earl of Thomond

The descendants of Brian were known as the Uí Briain (O'Brien) clan, hence the surnames Ó Briain, O'Brien, O'Brian etc. O was originally Ó which in turn came from Ua, which means 'grandson or descendant' (of a named person). The prefix is often anglicised to O', using an apostrophe instead of the Irish síneadh fada (the acute accent ◌́). The O'Briens subsequently ranked as one of the chief dynastic families of the country.

Brian's third great-granddaughter was Gwenllian ferch Gruffydd (c. 1097 – c. 1136), Princess consort of Deheubarth in Wales, leader of the patriotic revolt and battle that contributed to the Great Revolt of 1136. The Barons Inchiquin claim descent from Brian Boru, as did Sir Donough O'Brien, 1st Baronet.

== Ancestry ==
Ancestry of Brian Boru

Ancestors of Brian Boru

8. Lachtna mac Corc
4. Lorcáin mac Lachtna
2. Cennétig mac Lorcáin, king of Thomond
1. Brian Boru, High King of Ireland
12. Murchadh mac Maenach, king of Maigh Seóla
6. Urchadh mac Murchadh, king of Maigh Seóla
3. Bé Binn inion Urchadh
14. Criachan
7. Osnad ingen Criachan
15. Cianog ingen Ciocharan

== Cultural heritage ==
=== Literature ===
Finnegans Wake (1939), by James Joyce, makes multiple references to Brian Boru and Clontarf, in neologisms typical of that book ("clontarfminded") and obscure references (e.g. "as true as the Vernons have Brian's sword"—McHugh points out that the Vernons, an Italian family, had an ancient sword said to be Brian Boru's).

In the 1949 novel Silverlock by John Myers Myers, the death of Brian Boru is described from the main character's viewpoint.

Morgan Llywelyn's Lion of Ireland (1980) is a historical novel about the life of Brian Boru.

Donal O'Neill's Sons of Death (1988), a historical novel about Brian Boru, is told from the point of view of MelPatrick, a young nobleman at Brian's court. It uses the fictional device of the long-lost Brjánssaga as its source. It is the third in a series based on Irish history, beginning c. 800 BC (vol. 1, Crucible; vol. 2 Of Gods and Men).

The story of Brian Boru's final battle and death is told in Frank Delaney's novel Ireland (2005).

Robert E. Howard wrote two versions of the Battle of Clontarf in 1931; a realistic historical novellette entitled "The Spears of Clontarf", which he modified to include fantastic elements such as the appearance of the God Odin and retitled "The Grey God Passes". "The Cairn on the Headland" is a sequel to the latter set in the present day.

Brian Boru's stand against the Vikings at the Battle of Clontarf was referenced in the Star Trek: Deep Space Nine episode "Bar Association", as the subject of a holosuite program devised by Chief Miles O'Brien - a proud Irishman (who, naturally, played Boru).

Little Irish History Heroes (2026) by Niamh Donnellan includes the story of Brian Boru suitable for young children.

=== Music ===
Brian Boru's March
Brian Boru's March performed by military band.

His name is remembered in the title of one of the oldest tunes in Ireland's traditional repertoire: "Brian Boru's March". It is still widely played by many traditional Irish musicians. He was the subject of at least two operas: Brian Boroihme (1810) by Johann Bernhard Logier (1777–1846) and Brian Boru (1896) by Julian Edwards (1855–1910). His burial in St Patrick's Cathedral is referenced in the song "Boys from the County Armagh" by Thomas P. Keenan (1866–1927). His exploits in battle serve as the inspiration for Irish folk metal band Cruachan's song, Born for War (The Rise of Brian Boru).

== See also ==
- Annals of Tigernach
- Annals of Ulster
- History of Ireland (800–1169)
- History of Ireland
- Lists of Irish kings
- List of High Kings of Ireland

== External resources ==
- Battle of Clontarf website produced by Trinity College Dublin

Brian Boru Dál gCais
Regnal titles
Preceded by Máel Muad mac Brain	King of Munster; 978–1014	Succeeded by Dúngal mac Máelfothartaig Hua Donnchada
Preceded by Máel Sechnaill mac Domnaill	High King of Ireland; 1002–1014	Succeeded by Máel Sechnaill mac Domnaill, restored
