= Murchad mac Briain =

Son and heir of Brian Boru (High King of Ireland)

Murchad mac Briain was the son and heir of Brian Boru, a High King of Ireland. He was the de facto leader of his father's army, killed on 23 April 1014 at the Battle of Clontarf.

== Biography ==
In 1013 there was a rebellion by Máel Mórda, King of Leinster, and Sitric Silkenbeard, the Viking king of Dublin against Brian Boru's rule in Ireland. Murchad was sent by Brian to deal with the rebellion. According to the Annals of Ulster he "made a great raid into Laigin, plundered the land to Glenn dá Locha and Cell Maignenn, burned the whole country, and took great spoils and countless captives."

It is said that before the battle of Clontarf that some Vikings fled "for they dread the valor of Murchad and the Dal gCais in general" He also allegedly carried two swords in battle. Some accounts say he died in battle with his father Brian, though most accounts report that Brian never fought in the battle, which is the accepted version of events by historians. He was buried in Armagh along with his father and other relatives. He had a son called Toirdelbach mac Murchada meic Briain.
