= Parkavonear Castle =

Ruined castle in County Kerry, Ireland

Coordinates: 52.0759°N 9.5550°W

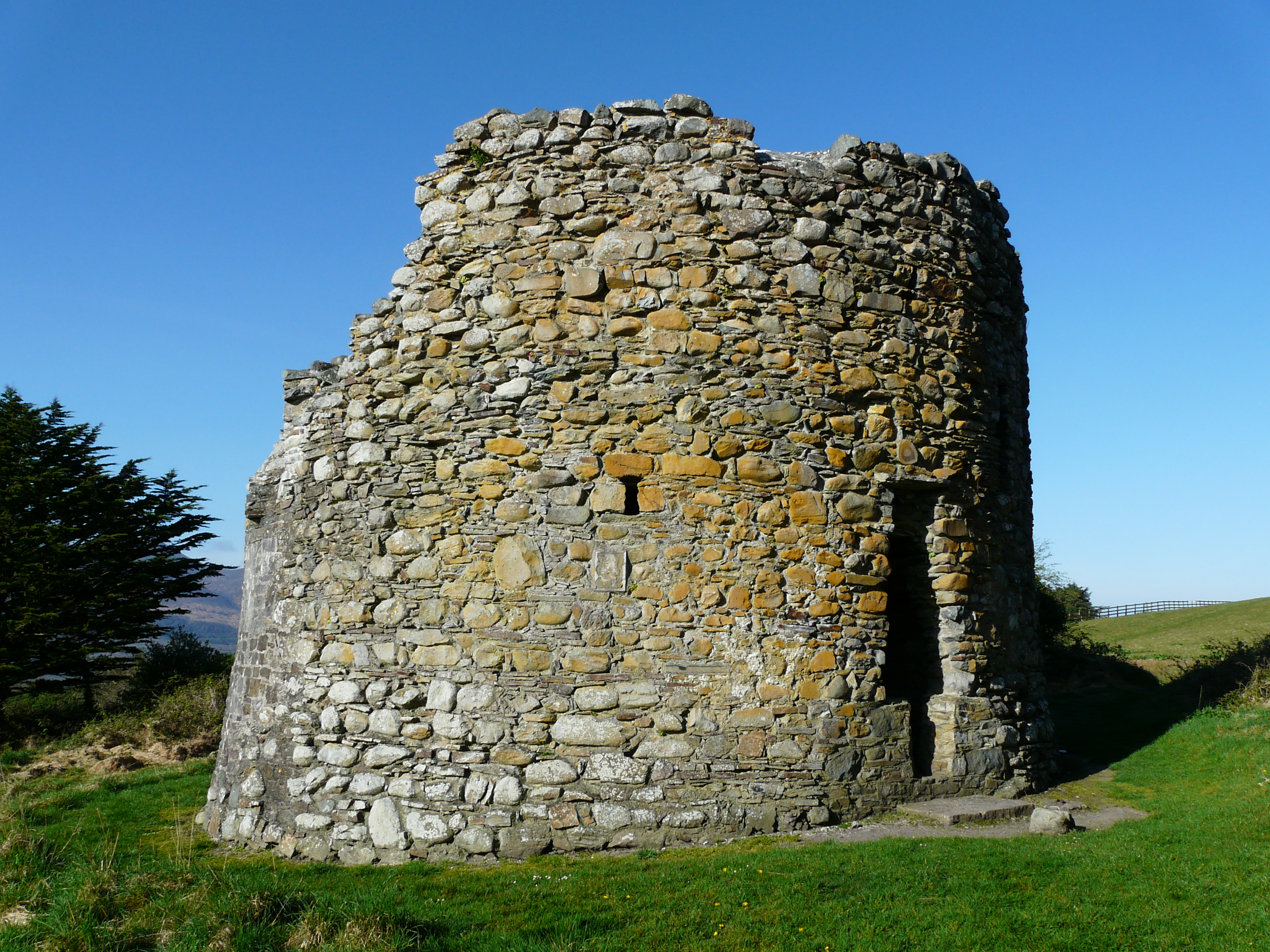
Remains of the Parkavonear Castle keep

Parkavonear Castle is a 13th-century Anglo-Norman ruin in Aghadoe in Ireland, overlooking the lakes of Killarney. It was built following the Anglo-Norman invasion of Ireland in 1169.

== Description ==
The castle is two stories high and built to a cylindrical design rather than the more common rectangular shape for Norman tower houses. The walls are two metres (7 ft) thick, and the internal floor space is several metres (or yards) wide. There is a staircase within the wall joining the two floors. An entrance has been made into the lower floor, but originally the only entry would have been to the higher floor, enabling the occupants to pull in the ladder in time of attack. Only the stone parts of the structure remain, as the wooden floors and roof have deteriorated and been removed. Square earthworks surrounded the keep but only traces of them remain.

== Name ==
Parkavonear Castle takes its name from the Irish paírc an mhóinéir, meaning "field of the meadow". It is sometimes spelt Parkvonear, but local spelling includes the middle letter 'a'.

== Sources ==
- "Parkavonear Castle". Archived from the original on 17 July 2011.
