= Máel Mórda mac Murchada =

King of the province of Leinster in Ireland

Malachy MacMurrough (Middle Irish: Mael Mórda mac Murchada; modern Irish: Máel Mórda mac Murchada; died 23 April 1014 AD) was King of Leinster, Ireland in the late 10th and early 11th century.

Son of King Murchad mac Finn and brother of Gormflaith, he belonged to the northern Leinster dynasty of the Uí Dúnlainge, and in particular the branch of the Uí Fáeláin whose lands lay around the town of Naas, anciently Nás na Rí, "the Assembly Place of the Kings" or Nás Laighean "the Assembly Place of the Leinstermen" on the middle reaches of the River Liffey, in modern County Kildare.

Máel Mórda is best known as an enemy of Brian Boru, King of Munster, they fought at the Battle of Glenmama on 30 December 999 and both men died in the Battle of Clontarf, fought on Good Friday in 1014.

According to the account of the battle contained in Cogad Gáedel re Gallaib ("The War of the Irish with the Foreigners") King Máel Mórda died in single combat with Conaing mac Donncuan, King of Desmond, Brian Boru's nephew, as follows "We must next speak of Conaing. He faced Maelmordha, son of Murchadh, king of Laighin, and sixteen men of the people were killed, each man of them, in front of his lord, before they themselves met, and fell by each other, viz., Conaing, king of Des-Mhumha, and Maelmordha, king of Laighin"

According to the Annals of Tigernach, Máel Mórda's son "Cearball mac Mael Mordha, crown-prince of Leinster" was killed in 1017.

His other son Bran mac Máelmórda was King of Leinster from around 1016 until he lost the kingship in 1018 after being blinded by his cousin the King of Dublin Sitric Silkenbeard son of Amlaib, after which Bran retired to Cologne, probably to the Benedictine monastery of Great St Martin which was run by Irish monks at the time. The Annals of Ulster record in 1052 that "Braen son of Mael Mórda, king of Laigin, died in Cologne".

Perhaps as a result of the heavy losses at Clontarf, Braen was the last of the Uí Fáeláin line of Kings of Leinster, though his descendants achieved fame as the medieval O'Byrne sept of Leinster (O'Byrne or ó Broin in Irish translates as "grandson/descendant of Braen").

== In popular culture ==
The Irish doom metal group Mael Mórdha take their name from Máel Mórda mac Murchada and many of their songs are based on the events of the Battle of Clontarf.
