= Innisfallen =

Island and monastery in the Lough Leane, Ireland

Native name: Inis Faithlinn
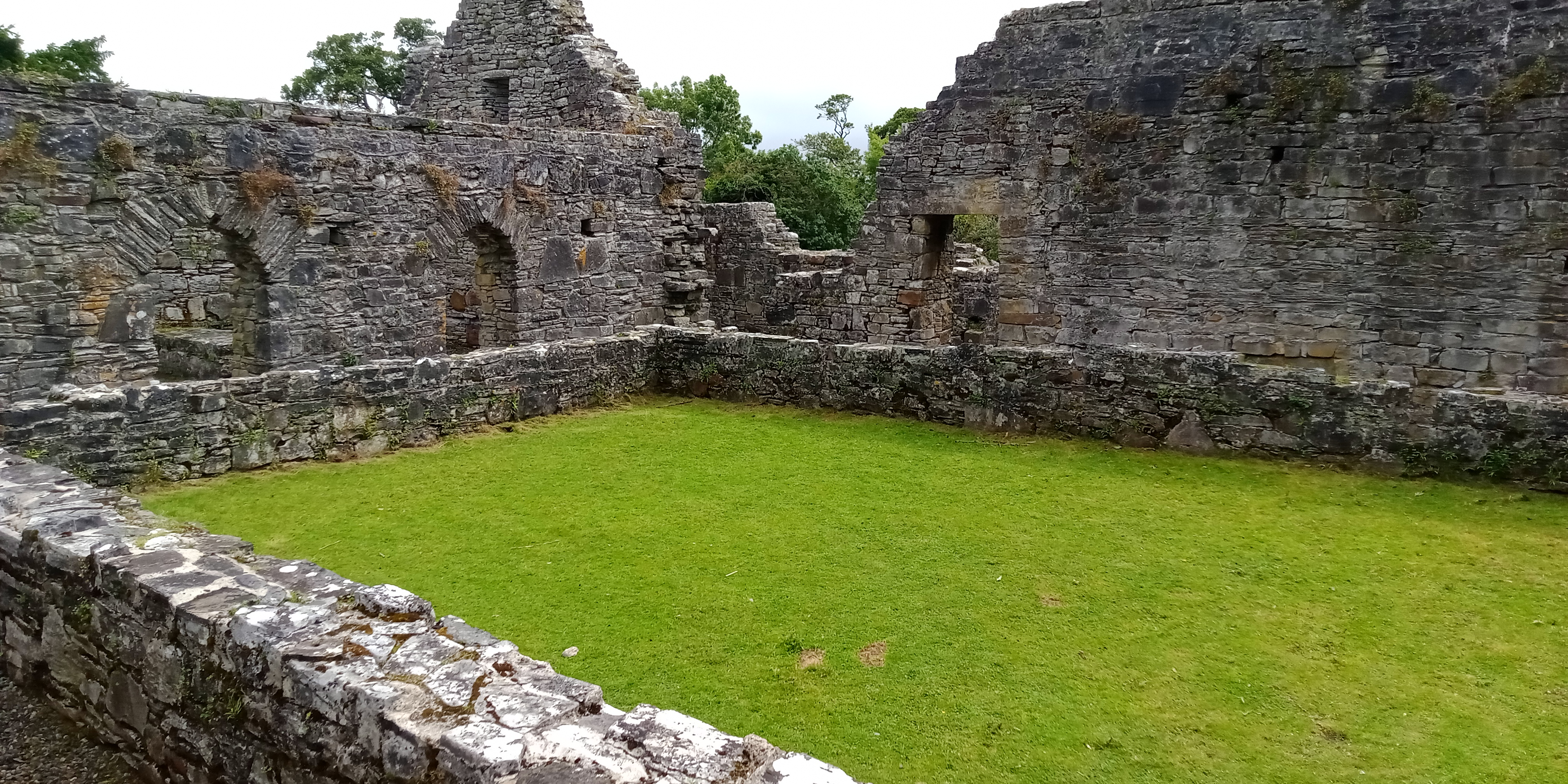
- Cloister of Inisfallen Abbey
- Interactive map of Innisfallen

Geography
- Location: Lough Leane
- Coordinates: 52°02′45″N 9°33′13″W
- Area: 21 acres (8.5 ha)

Administration
- Ireland
- Province: Munster
- County: Kerry

Innisfallen (/ˌɪnɪsˈfælən/ IN-iss-FAL-ən) or Inishfallen (from Irish: Inis Faithlinn [ˈɪnʲəʃ ˈfˠah(ə)lʲən̠ʲ], meaning 'Faithlinn's island') is an island in Lough Leane in County Kerry, Ireland. Innisfallen is home to the ruins of Inisfallen Abbey, which was founded in the 7th century.

The island is best known where the Annals of Innisfallen were compiled, a medieval chronicle recording Irish history from late antiquity through the Middle Ages. The surviving ruins consist mainly of stone structures dating from the 10th to 12th centuries.

== Description ==
Innisfallen is situated about the midway in Lough Leane, County Kerry. The island is some 8.5 hectares (21 acres) in area, mostly wooded, with undulating hills and many slopes. It lies within the Killarney National Park.

The island's monastery is thought to have given rise to the name Lough Leane (Irish Loch Léin), which in English means "Lake of Learning". According to tradition the Irish High King Brian Boru received his education at Innisfallen under Maelsuthain O'Carroll. Maelsuthain has been credited as the possible originator of the Annals.

== History ==
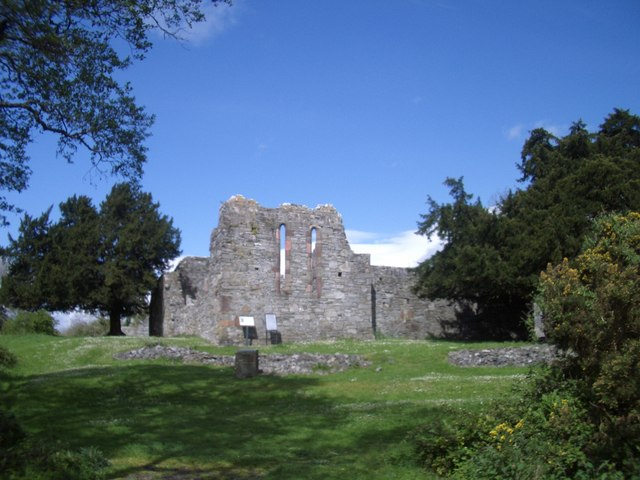
Innisfallen abbey

Innisfallen Abbey comprises the remains of an early medieval monastic settlement on Innisfallen Island. A monastery was founded on the island around 640 AD, traditionally attributed to a Saint Finian; scholars generally identify the founder as either Finian Lobhar (Finan the Leper), a disciple of Columba, or Finan Cam of Corca Dhuibhne. No physical evidence survives of the earliest monastic buildings, which were likely constructed of wood. The monastery is particularly notable as the place where the Annals of Innisfallen were compiled, recording Irish history from 433 to 1450, with additional material relating to earlier periods.

The Annals document recorded periods of unrest, including Viking raids and a notable attack in 1180 by the O’Donoghue clan, during which valuables were taken from the church. Following the Norman invasion of Ireland in the late 12th century, the monastery came under Augustinian control and was renamed the Priory of Saint Mary. In 1582, the religious community was dissolved under Elizabeth I, and ownership of the island passed through several hands before becoming part of the Kenmare estate. In 1973, Innisfallen Island was transferred into state ownership and incorporated into Killarney National Park.

The surviving ruins include several stone structures dating mainly from the 10th to 12th centuries. Near the lakeshore stands an oratory with a Romanesque doorway carved in a Hiberno-Norman style, while the larger abbey church retains elements that may incorporate reused stone from earlier Irish-built churches. Other remains on the island include a small early church, domestic buildings associated with monastic life, and features such as a bullaun stone, typical of early Irish monastic sites.

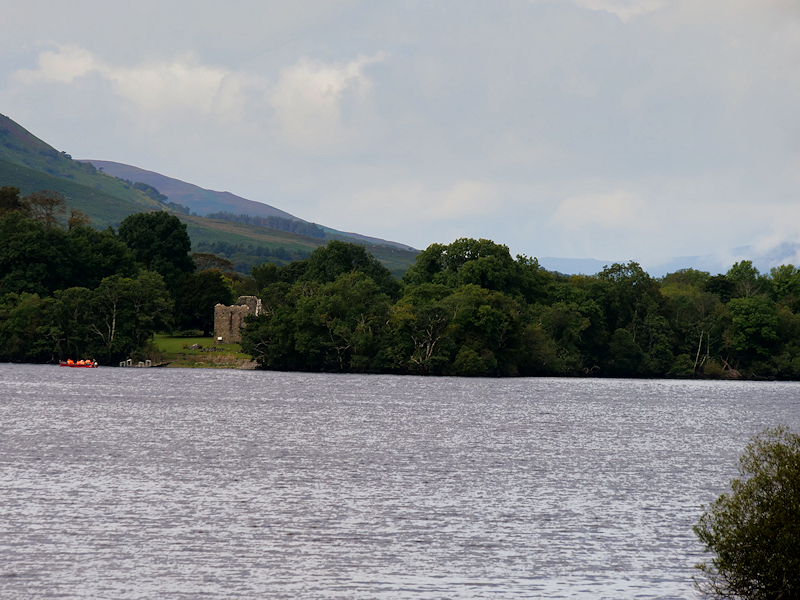
View of the island from Lough Leane

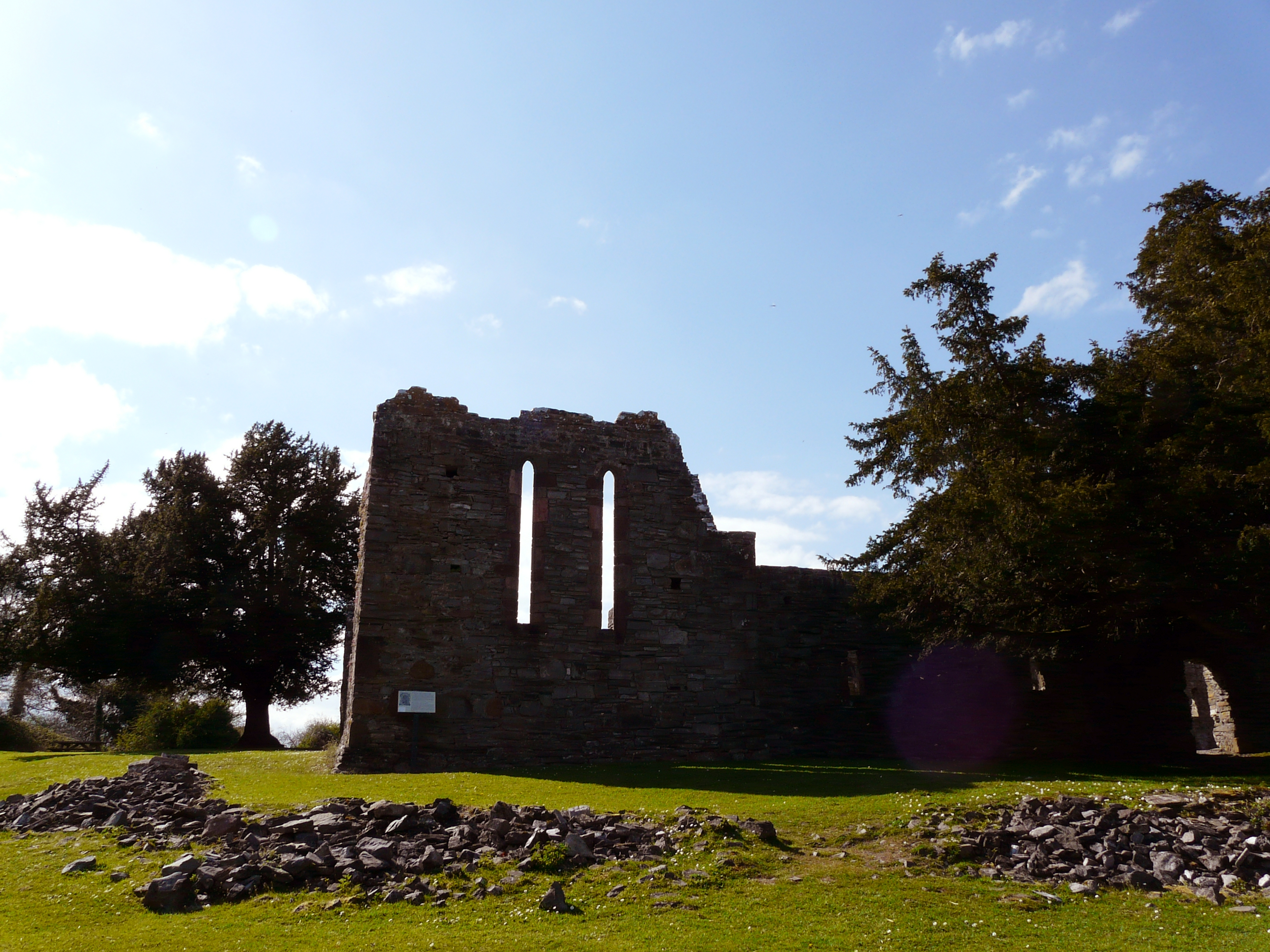
View of the abbey

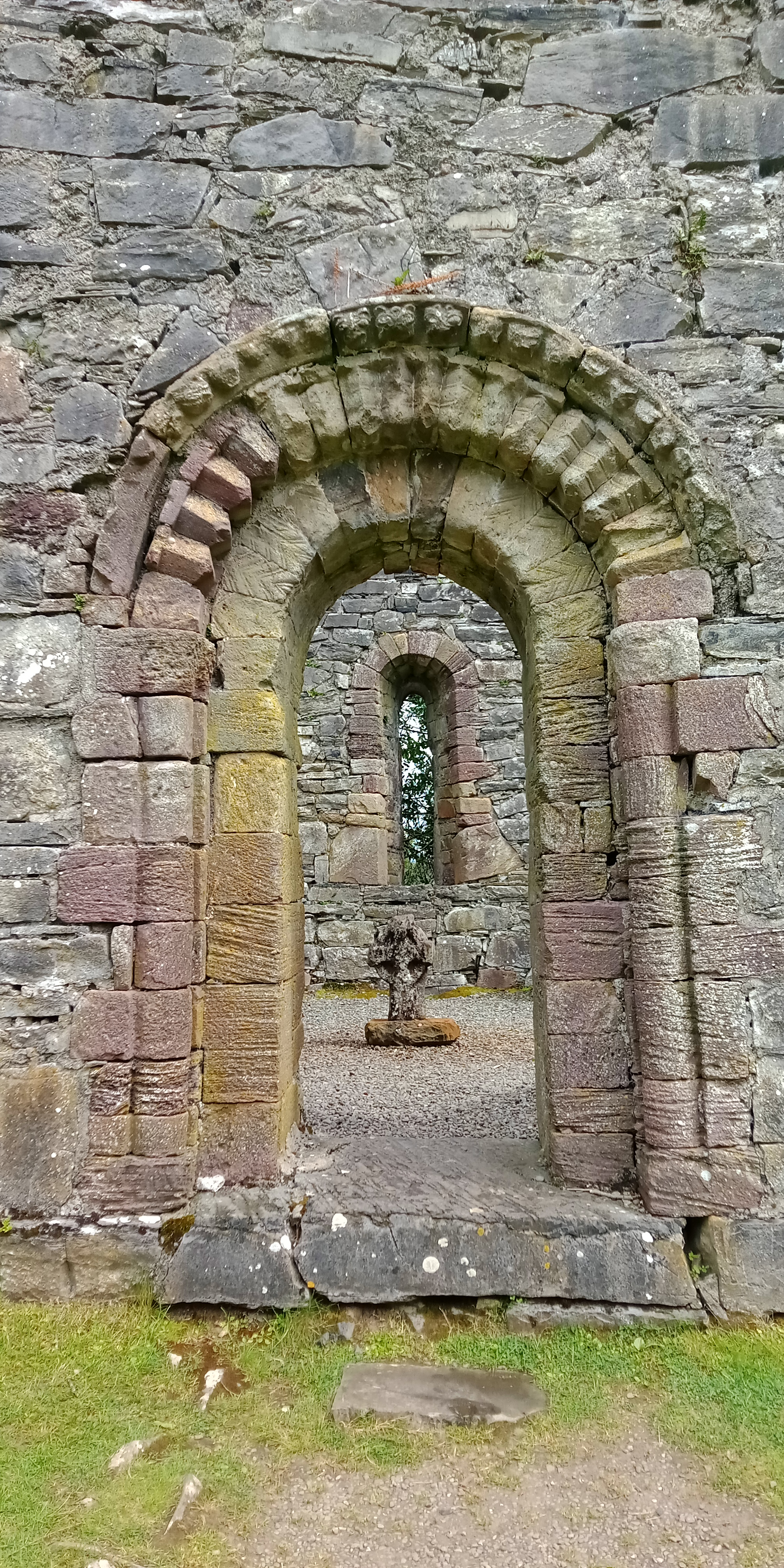
Entrance to the abbey

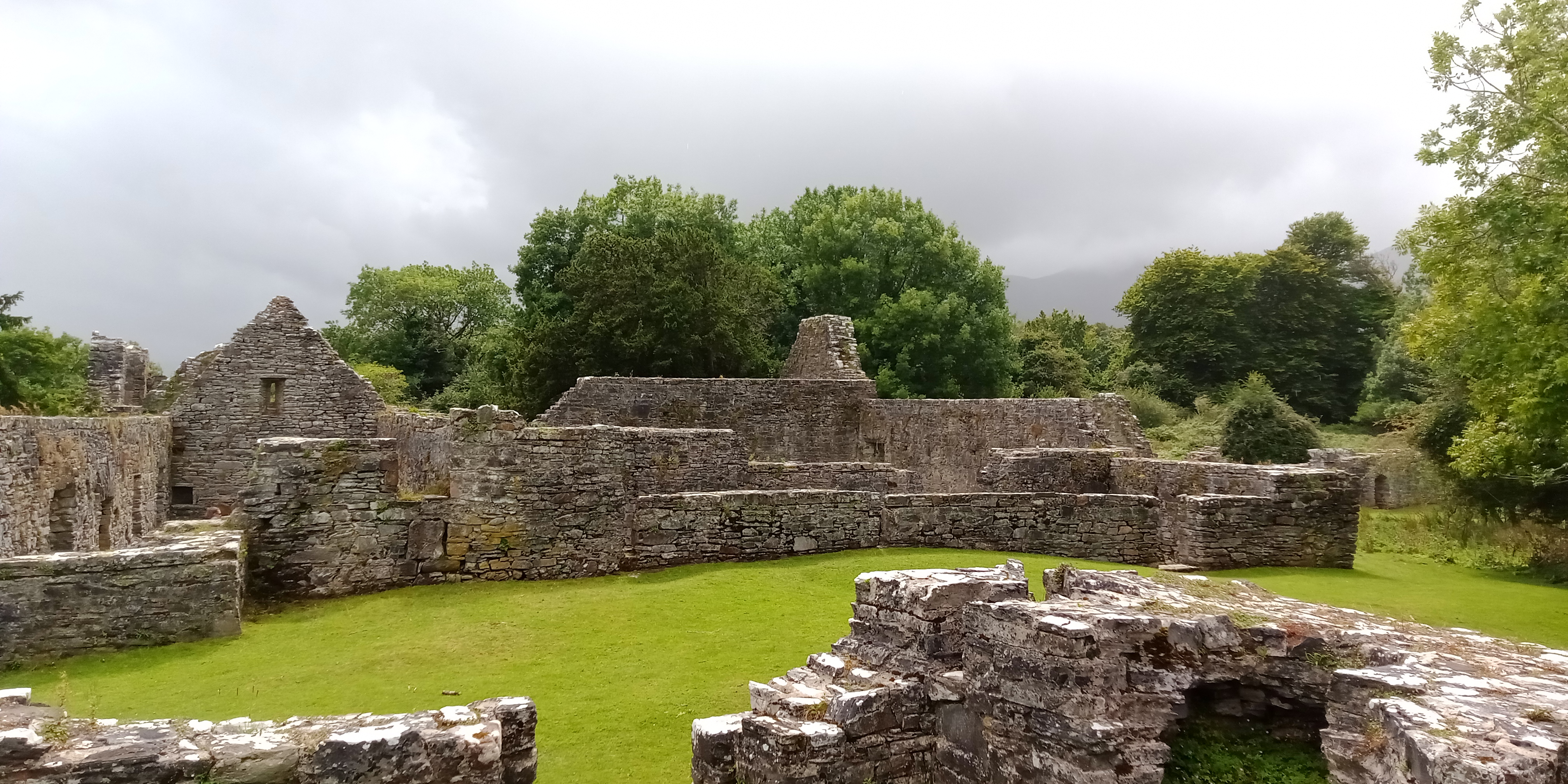
Cloisters

== Literature ==
Innisfallen has been referenced in Irish literary and musical works of the 19th century. The island is the subject of the song Sweet Innisfallen by Thomas Moore, reflecting its association with the Lakes of Killarney. It also features in The Abbot of Innisfallen. A Killarney Legend, a poem by William Allingham first published in Macmillan’s Magazine in 1864. The poem was later set to music by Geoffrey Molyneux Palmer as The Abbot of Innisfallen, Op. 5, which won the cantata prize at the 1908 Feis Ceoil in Dublin. Inishfallen, Fare Thee Well, a line from Moore's poem, was taken by Sean O'Casey as a title for the fourth volume of his autobiography.

== Sources ==
- Description of the lakes of Killarney and the surrounding scenery. London: W. H. Smith & Son. 1849. OCLC 935098203. OL 23463670M.
- Healy, John (1890), Insula Sanctorum Et Doctorum, BoD – Books on Demand, ISBN 978-3-7523-3423-4 This article incorporates text from this source, which is in the public domain.
- Okasha, Elisabeth; Forsyth, Katherine (2001), Early Christian inscriptions of Munster: a corpus of the inscribed stones, Cork University Press
