= Annals of Inisfallen =

Manuscript chronicling the medieval history of Ireland

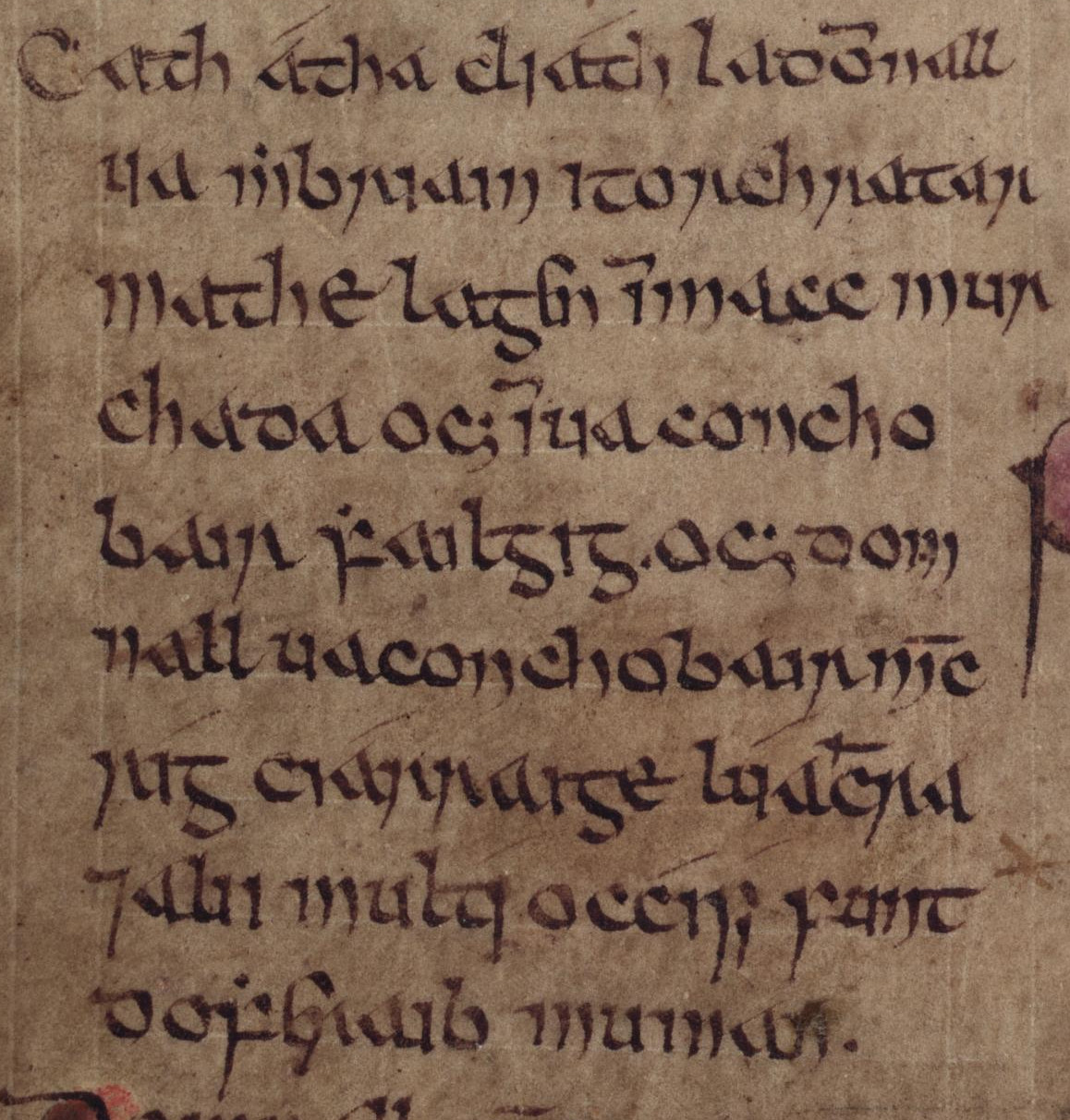
- An excerpt from the Annals of Inisfallen
- Author: The monks of Innisfallen Abbey
- Original title: Annála Inis Faithlinn
- Language: Irish Gaelic
- Subject: Medieval history of Ireland
- Publication place: Ireland

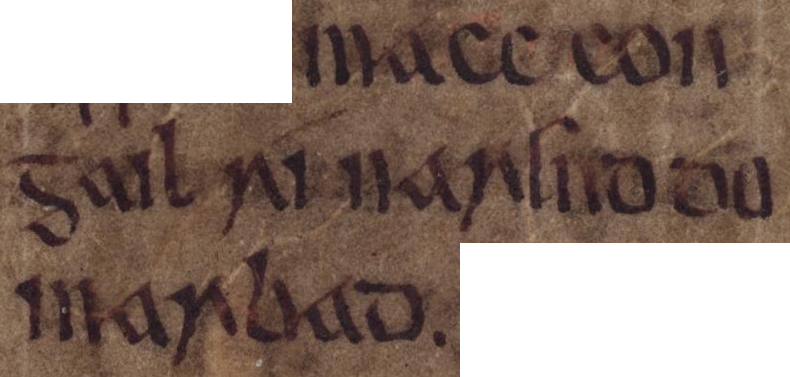
An excerpt (Bodleian Library MS. Rawl. B. 503, folio 30r). The text refers to an event dated 1094, and reads in Irish "Macc Congail, rí na Rend, do marbad", which translates into English as "Congal's son, king of Na Renna, was slain".

The Annals of Inisfallen (Irish: Annála Inis Faithlinn) are a chronicle of the medieval history of Ireland.

== Overview ==
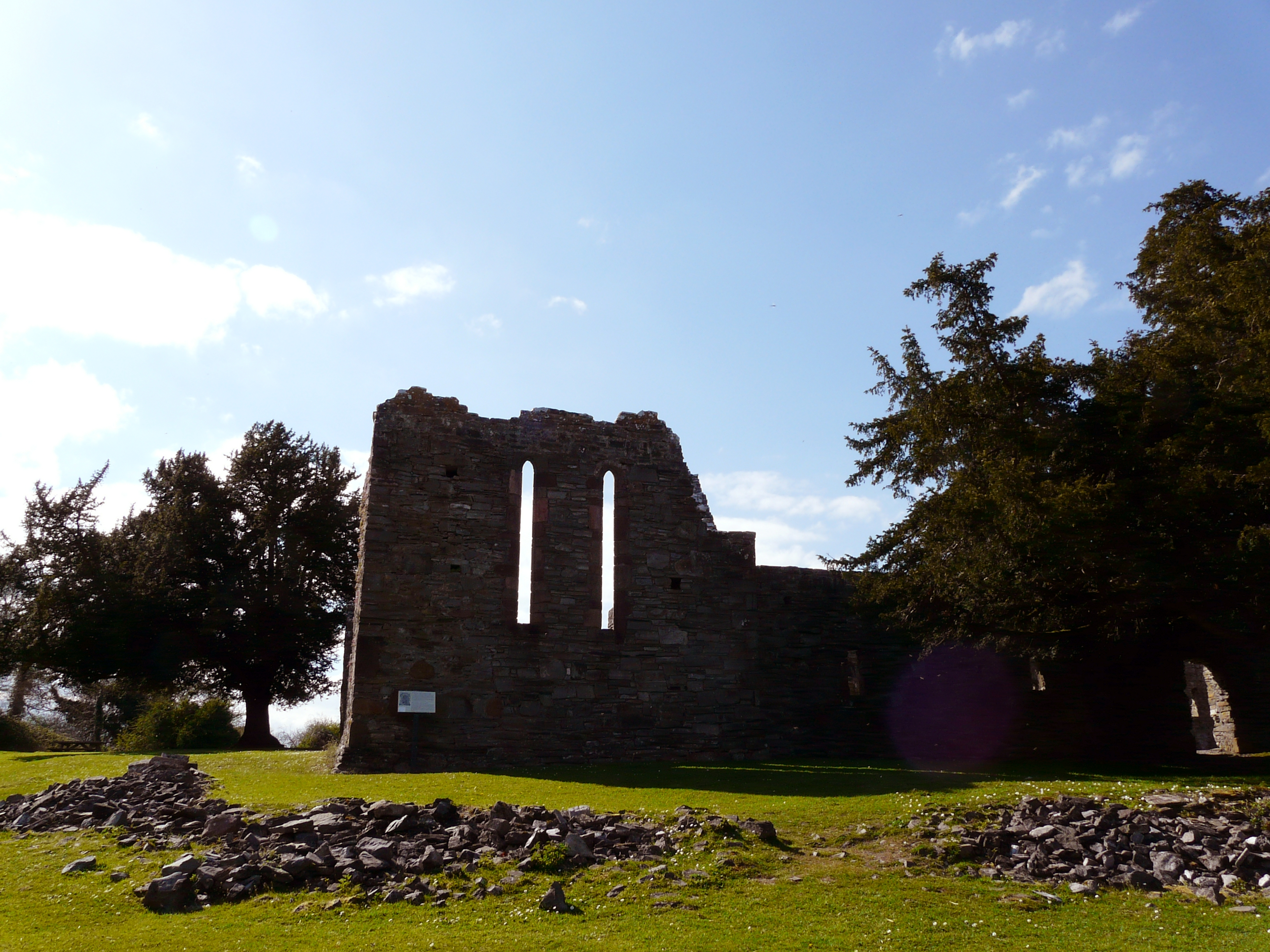
Ruined abbey at Innisfallen

There are more than 2,500 entries spanning the years between 433 and 1450. The manuscript is thought to have been compiled in 1092, as the chronicle is written by a single scribe up to that point but updated by many different hands thereafter. It was written by the monks of Innisfallen Abbey, on Innisfallen Island on Lough Leane, near Killarney in Munster, but made use of sources produced at different centres around Munster as well as a Clonmacnoise group text of the hypothetical Chronicle of Ireland. It is regarded as the main source for the medieval history of Munster.

As well as the chronological entries, the manuscript contains a short, fragmented narrative of the history of pre-Christian Ireland, known as the pre-Patrician section, from the time of Abraham to the arrival of Saint Patrick in Ireland. This has many elements in common with Lebor Gabála Érenn. It sets the history of Ireland and the Gaels within Eusebian universal history, which is provided both by a Latin world chronicle and extracts from Réidig dam, a Dé, do nim, a Middle Irish poem attributed to Flann Mainistrech in later manuscripts.

The annals are now housed in the Bodleian Library in Oxford. In 2001, Brian O'Leary, a Fianna Fáil councillor in Killarney, called for the annals to be returned to the town. Although it was loaned to Ireland on occasion, it remains in Oxford.

== See also ==
- Irish annals
- The Chronicle of Ireland

== Sources ==
- Evans, Nicholas (2010), The Present and the Past in Medieval Irish Chronicles, Studies in Celtic History 27, Woodbridge: Boydell
- Hughes, Kathleen (1972), Early Christian Ireland: Introduction to the Sources, Sources of History, London: Hodder and Stoughton
- Mac Airt, Seán (1951), The Annals of Inisfallen: MSS Rawlinson B503, Dublin: Hodges, Figgs & Co
- Welch, Robert (2000), The Concise Oxford Companion to Irish Literature, Oxford University Press, ISBN 9780192800800
