= Mór ingen Taidhg an Tuir =

Mór ingen Taidhg an Tuir, was Queen of Ireland upon her death in 991. She was the widow of Domnall ua Néill, who was High King of Ireland from 956 to 980. He appears to have been the first person called ard-rí Érenn (High King of Ireland) in his obituary.

She was a daughter of Tadg mac Cathail, King of Connacht from 925 to 956. Her siblings included Conchobar mac Tadg (King of Connacht 967–973), Cathal mac Tadg (King of Connacht in 973), and Máel Ruanaid Mór mac Tadg.

The Chronicon Scotorum has her death under the year 992 - Mór daughter of Tadc son of Cathal son of Conchobor, queen of Ireland, dies.

The Annals of the Four Masters (compiled 1632-1636) state: Mór, inghen Taidhg an Tuir, mic Cathail, bainríoghan Ereann, d'ég./Mor, daughter of Tadhg of the Tower, son of Cathal, Queen of Ireland, died.

== See also ==
- Mór (Irish name)
- Mór ingen Cearbhaill, Queen of Laigin, died 916
- Mór Ní Tuathail, Queen of Laigin, c. 1114–1191
- Mor Ní Briain, Queen of Connacht, died 1218
