= Orla (name) =

- Pronunciation: /ˈɔːrlə/ OR-lə
- Gender: Female (Irish); Male (Danish); Unisex (Norwegian, Finnish, German)

Origin
- Meaning: Golden princess (Irish)
- Region of origin: Ireland (feminine); Denmark (masculine)

Other names
- Alternative spelling: Órla, Orlaith, Orlagh
- Related names: Órlaith, Órfhlaith
- Popularity: see popular names

Orla (/ˈɔːrlə/ OR-lə) is an anglicisation of Órfhlaith, a feminine given name of Irish origin. The name is often interpreted as meaning "golden princess", as it is derived from the Irish words ór ("gold") and flaith (literally "prince"; its full feminine form being banfhlaith).

Well known via association with Brian Boru, whose sister Órlaith íngen Cennétig (d. 941) was queen consort to the Irish High King Donnchad Donn, Órflaith (however spelled) was the fourth-most frequently recorded female name in the annals of 12th century Ireland; after a long period of obscurity, the name—in both the Órlaith and Órla forms—became popular in the late 20th century, not only in Ireland but also in Scotland, despite the name not having historical use in the region.

Orla is also a male given name in Danish and has been used as a unisex name in Norwegian, Finnish and German.

Orla is also a short form of the name Orsola, which is a variant of Ursula.

== Significance of the Fada in "Órla" ==
In the Irish language, the presence of a fada (diacritic) is crucial, as it changes the pronunciation and meaning of a name. Órla, with a fada, is pronounced /ˈɔːrlə/ ("OR-lə") and retains its traditional and culturally significant meaning, while Orla, without a fada, is pronounced /ˈʌɹlə/ ("urlah") and can lead to misinterpretations and unintended meanings. The omission of fadas in names, especially in official records, has sparked discussions about linguistic accuracy and cultural representation.

== Historical figures ==
- Órlaith íngen Cennétig, Queen of Ireland, died 941
- Órlaith Ní Maoil Seachnaill, Queen of Mide, died 1066
- Órlaith Nic Cennétich, died 1104. The ship LÉ Orla is named after her.
- Órlaith Ní Mael Sechlainn, Queen of Connacht, died 1115
- Órlaith Ní Diarmata, Princess of Moylurg, died 1252
- Órlaith Ní Conchobair, Princess of Connacht and Abbess, died 1283

== Arts and media ==
- Orla Brady, (born 1961), Irish actress; her most notable and critically acclaimed work was the 1999 film A Love Divided
- Orlagh Cassidy, (born 1968), American actress
- Orla Egan, (born 1966), Irish LGBTQ+ activist, educator, filmmaker and historian
- Órla Fallon, (born 1974), Irish singer, songwriter, and harpist. She was a member of Celtic Woman from 2005 to 2009.
- Orla Fitzgerald, (born 1978), Irish actress
- Órfhlaith Flynn, former member of Anúna
- Orla Gartland, (born 1995), Irish singer
- Orla Guerin, (born 1966), Irish correspondent for BBC Africa
- Orla Hill, (born 2002), English actress
- Orla Kiely, (born 1962), graduated from The National College of Art and Design in Dublin, and continued her education with a master's degree at the Royal College of Art in London. Her trademark leaf pattern used in her handbag design has become a highly recognisable international brand. Her collection now spans womenswear, accessories, wallpaper, homewares and stationery, plus a collection of notepaper for Tate Modern.
- Orlaith McAllister, (born 1979), Northern Irish glamour model and former Big Brother contestant
- Orla Ní Fhinneadha, Irish television presenter on TG4
- Orla O'Rourke, Irish actress
- Orla O'Shea, Irish singer
- Orlaith Rafter, Irish actor and writer
- Orla Tinsley, (born 1987), Irish writer and campaigner
- Orla Tobin, singer, winner of the 2003 Rose of Tralee contest
- Orla Wolf, (born 1971), German writer, artist and filmmaker

== Sports ==
- Orla Barry, (born 1994), Irish discus thrower
- Orla Jørgensen, (1904–1947), Danish male Olympic gold medalist in 1928
- Orla Noom, (born 1985), professional squash player from the Netherlands
- Orla O'Doherty, (born 1971), professional squash player from Ireland
- Orla Walsh, (born 1989), Irish track cyclist

== Other ==
- Órfhlaith Begley, (born 1991), MP in the UK Parliament for West Tyrone
- Órlaithí Flynn, (born 1988), member of the Northern Ireland Assembly for Belfast West
- Orla Hyllested, (1912–2000), Danish union representative and politician
- Orla Lehmann, (1810–1870), Danish statesman
- Orla Møller (1916–1979), Danish priest and politician
- Orla, Italian organ maker

== Fictional characters ==
- Orla McCool, from the sitcom Derry Girls
- Orla Healy, from the television drama Three Families
- Orla Sargent, from the young adult books The Raven Cycle
- Agent Orla, from the educational television series Odd Squad
- Orla, from the novel The Sopranos and its film adaptation Our Ladies
- Orla, male protagonist of the 19th century German emancipation drama Orla by Albert Dulk
- Orla, female supporting character from Pokémon Horizons: The Series
