= Battle of Islandbridge =

AD 919 attempt to drive Vikings from Ireland

Coordinates: 53.3473°N 6.3083°W

- Part of the Viking activities in Ireland
Date	14 September 919
Location	near Islandbridge, County Dublin
Result	Viking victory

Belligerents
Kingdom of Dublin	Irish coalition: Northern Uí Néill; Ulaid; Brega; Airgíalla; Mide; South Brega

Commanders and leaders
Sitric Cáech	Niall Glúndub †; Áed mac Eochocáin †; Máel Craibe ua Duibsinig †; Máel Mithig mac Flannacain †; Conchobar mac Flainn †; Cellach mac Fogartaig †

Strength
Unknown	Unknown

Casualties and losses
Unknown	Unknown

The Battle of Islandbridge, also called the Battle of Áth Cliath, took place on 14 September 919, between a coalition of native Irish, led by Niall Glúndub, overking of the Northern Uí Néill and High King of Ireland, and the Dublin-based Vikings of the Uí Ímair, led by Sitric Cáech. It was one in a series of battles initiated by the native Irish to attempt to drive the Vikings of the Uí Ímair from Ireland. The battle was a decisive victory for Sitric Cáech and the Uí Ímair, with Niall Glúndub and five other Irish kings dying in the battle.

== Background ==
The ruling Vikings of Dublin, the Uí Ímair, had been expelled from the city in 902 by a joint force led by Máel Finnia mac Flannacán, overking of Brega and Cerball mac Muirecáin, overking of Leinster. However, this expulsion was temporary and Viking raids continued on Irish settlements. In 914 a large Viking fleet sailed to the previously Viking-controlled city of Waterford, and the following year more Vikings settled in Limerick, though Dublin itself remained outside Uí Ímair control.

In 917 two prominent members of the Uí Ímair, Ragnall and Sitric Cáech, grandsons of Ímar, sailed separate fleets to Ireland, Ragnall landing at Waterford and Sitric Cáech landing at "Cenn Fuait" in Leinster.

The exact location of "Cenn Fuait" is uncertain. The Annals of Ulster describe Cenn Fuait as being on the airer of Leinster. Airer is an Irish word meaning "coast" or "border region". Suggestions for the location include Confey near modern-day Leixlip, County Kildare and St Mullin's, County Carlow. (Note: The exact location of "Cenn Fuait" is uncertain. The Annals of Ulster describe Cenn Fuait as being on the airer of Leinster. Airer is an Irish word meaning "coast" or "border region". Suggestions for the location include Confey near modern-day Leixlip, County Kildare and St Mullin's, County Carlow.)

Several native Irish kings gathered forces to try to drive off the Vikings, including Niall Glúndub, over-king of the Northern Uí Néill and High King of Ireland, and Augaire mac Ailella, over-king of Leinster. The Vikings fought and won a victory against Niall Glúndub and the men of the Uí Néill at the Battle of Mag Femen in Brega, and then won another victory against Augaire mac Ailella and the men of Leinster at Cenn Fuait. (Note: King Augaire died in the battle.) Sitric led his men on a triumphant return to Dublin, re-establishing Viking rule and installing himself as king, while Ragnall returned to England.

== Battle ==
In 919 a number of Irish kings banded together to try to expel the Vikings from Dublin once more. The known kings who took part in this coalition were Niall Glúndub of the Northern Uí Néill, Áed mac Eochocáin of Ulster, Máel Mithig mac Flannacain of Brega, Mael Craibe mac Duibsinig of Airgíalla, Conchobar mac Flainn of Mide, and Cellach mac Fogartaig of South Brega. The historian Clare Downham has suggested that Niall Glundub and the other kings were emboldened by the departure of Ragnall from Ireland to try again to force out the Uí Ímair. The forces of Sitric and Niall met near Islandbridge in modern day County Dublin on the fourteenth of September. (Note: The Annals of Ulster give the date of the battle as the "eighteenth of the Calends of October". This corresponds to 14 September.) The Annals of the Four Masters describe Niall's words before the battle:

Whoever wishes for a speckled boss, and a sword of sore-inflicting wounds, and a green javelin for wounding wretches, let him go early in the morning to Áth Cliath.

The battle was an overwhelming victory for the Vikings, with many Irish nobles killed, including six kings: Niall Glúndub of the Northern Uí Néill, Áed mac Eochocáin of Ulster, Máel Mithig mac Flannacain of Brega, Mael Craibe mac Duibsinig of Airgíalla, Conchobar mac Flainn of Mide, and Cellach mac Fogartaig of South Brega. (Note: The Cogad Gaedel re Gallaib mentions twelve kings other than Niall Glúndub who died in the battle, but these are not named by contemporary annals and modern historians name only six kings.) Other notable casualties include one of Niall Glúndub's kinsmen, a member of the ruling dynasty of the Southern Uí Néill, and Eiremón mac Cennétig, Chief of the Cenél Maine.

The failure of this coalition to drive out the Vikings ensured the hold of the Uí Ímair on Dublin remained strong. Nevertheless, war between the Vikings and the native Irish continued, and the following year there was a battle between the Vikings of Dublin and Donnchad Donn, the brother of the slain king Conchobar mac Flainn and the new High King of Ireland.
