= History of Ireland (795–1169) =

The history of Ireland 795–1169 covers the period in the history of Ireland from the first Viking raid to the Norman invasion. The first two centuries of this period are characterised by Viking raids and the subsequent Norse settlements along the coast. Viking ports were established at Dublin, Wexford, Waterford, Cork and Limerick, which became the first large towns in Ireland.

Ireland consisted of many semi-independent territories (túatha), and attempts were made by various factions to gain political control over the whole of the island. For the first two centuries of this period, this was mainly a rivalry between putative High Kings of Ireland from the northern and southern branches of the Uí Néill. The one who came closest to being de facto king over the whole of Ireland, however, was Brian Boru, the first high king in this period not belonging to the Uí Néill.

Following Brian's death at the Battle of Clontarf in 1014, the political situation became more complex with rivalry for high kingship from several clans and dynasties. Brian's descendants failed to maintain a unified throne, and regional squabbling over territory led indirectly to the invasion of the Normans under Richard de Clare in 1169.

== Historiography ==
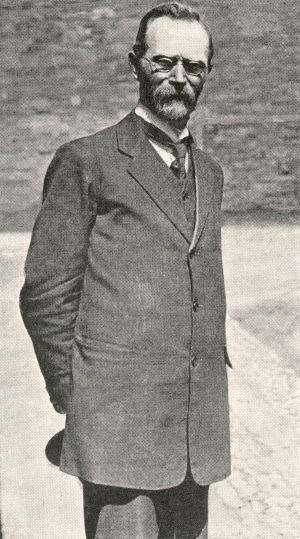
Eoin MacNeill, one of the pioneers in modern studies of Irish medieval history

Due to the rich amount of written sources, the study of Irish history 795–1169 has, to a large extent, focused on gathering, interpretation and textual criticism of these. Only recently have other sources of historical knowledge received more attention, particularly archaeology. Since the modern excavations of Dublin started in 1961, followed by similar efforts in Wexford, Waterford and Limerick, great advances have been made in the understanding of the physical character of the towns established during this period.

The first part of the period from 795 to 1014 is well-studied; the "Viking age" has attracted the interest of historians for quite some time. The period between 1014 and 1169 has received less attention. In the words of Sean Duffy, this period

has – historiographically speaking – fallen between two stools. Historians of early medieval Ireland, seeking to conclude their narratives on a high note, have traditionally done so after recounting the death of the famous high-king Brian Bórama (Boru) at the battle of Clontarf in 1014. On the other hand, historians of later medieval Ireland generally choose to begin proceedings with the English invasion of the 1160s. Eleventh- and early twelfth-century Ireland has, therefore, often assumed the character of a snappy epilogue or a lengthy prologue. (Note: See also McNeill, "Archaeology", "The 150 years before 1200 have been lost, between the assumptions that life was a continuation of the fifth through eighth-century world and that the incursion of English lords marked a fundamental change throughout Ireland.")

In trying to interpret the history of early Ireland, one of the most frequently asked questions addressed by historians is how early it is possible to speak of an Irish nation encompassing the whole island of Ireland. Early poet-historians like Flann Mainistrech constructed a history of a monarchy of all Ireland going back to and beyond St Patrick. Only a hundred years after Mainistrech, Gerald of Wales described the Irish society in his Topographia Hibernica as utterly primitive and savage. At the beginning of modern scholarly interpretation of Irish history, Eoin MacNeill and G.H. Orpen came to opposite conclusions analyzing the same period. Orpen saw an anarchic country still in 'a tribal state'; he could see no nation, no wider community in Ireland than the tribe. MacNeill stressed the reality of the high-kingship of Ireland and the existence of many of those institutions of government which Orpen found wanting, and claimed that Irish law had a national character.

== Nature of the written sources ==
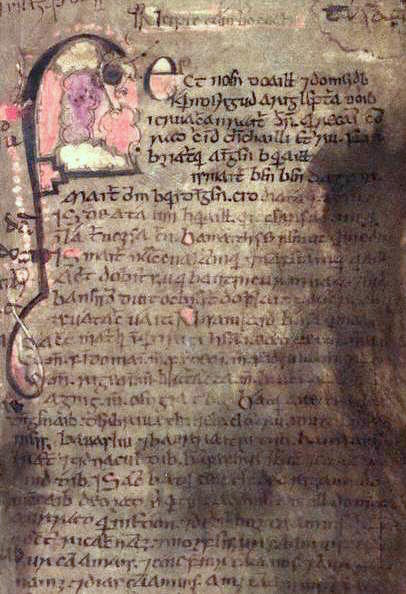
Folio 53 from the Book of Leinster

A large body of contemporary and near-contemporary material on early medieval Ireland has survived. From the titles of works mentioned in these sources, it is clear that a great deal of additional material has now been lost. The surviving materials usually exist in the form of much later copies, and it is only from comparison of the various texts that the original documents can be reconstructed.

Extant Irish annals are ultimately derived from the now-lost Chronicle of Ireland which was probably being compiled in the midlands of Ireland by around 800. All include material derived from other sources, or added at a later date. The Annals of Ulster and the Annals of Innisfallen cover most of this period, but have a gap between 1132 and 1155. The Annals of Clonmacnoise survive only in an eccentric 17th-century English translation, and the Annals of Tigernach for this period are lost with Dubhaltach Mac Fhirbhisigh's abbreviated copy known as the Chronicon Scotorum supplying only part of the missing material. The Annals of the Four Masters are late, and include some material of doubtful origin. While the annals provide a considerable amount of information, they are generally terse, and most focus their attention on the doings of the Uí Néill and of churchmen.

In addition to the annals, a large number of genealogies survive, along with geographical and legal texts, poetry, sagas and hagiography.

In the 12th century, propaganda text like Caithréim Chellacháin Chaisil and Cogad Gáedel re Gallaib were composed. Even though the historical accuracy of these accounts is dubious, the Cogad especially has had a great impact on the interpretation of Irish medieval history until recently.

== Political landscape c. 800 ==
At the end of the 8th century, Ireland was homogeneously Gaelic in terms of society, culture and language. People lived in rural communities, and the only larger settlements were monastic towns of varying sizes. The monasteries played an important part in society, not just with regards to religious and cultural life, but also to economy and politics. Christianization had begun in the 5th century, and by the early 9th century the island was almost entirely Christian. However, the Martyrology of Tallaght (written sometime in the 8th or 9th century) hints that paganism had not yet been fully uprooted.

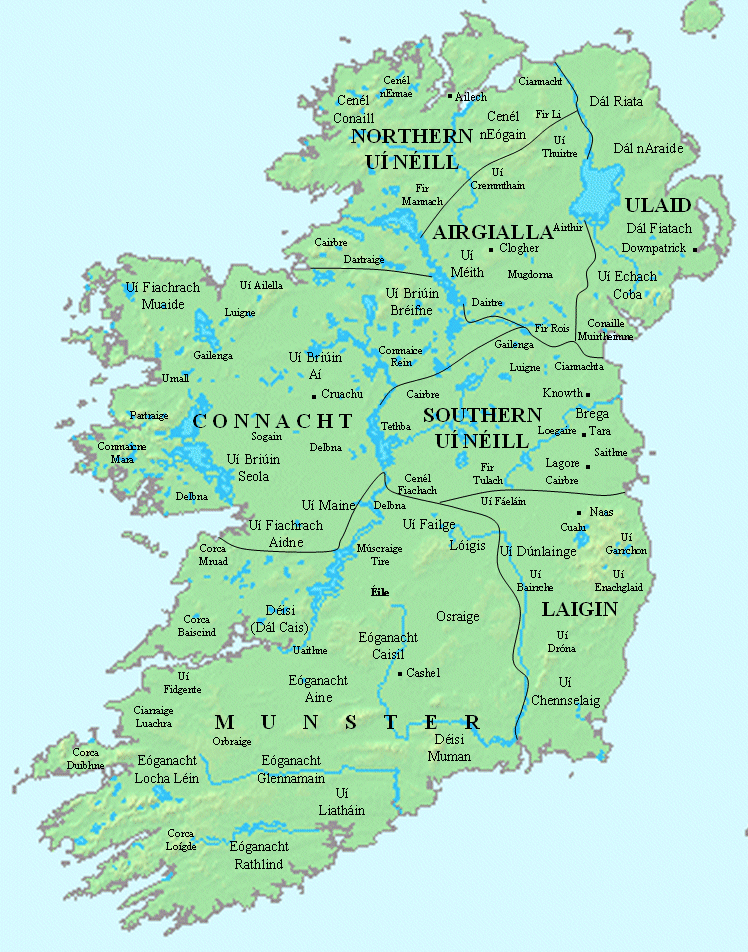
Peoples and subdivisions of early Ireland

Eoin MacNeill identified the "oldest certain fact in the political history of Ireland" as the existence in late prehistory of a pentarchy, probably consisting of the cóiceda or "fifths" of the Ulaid (Ulster), the Connachta (Connacht), the Laigin (Leinster), Mumu (Munster) and Mide (Meath), although some accounts discount Mide and split Mumu in two. This is not an accurate description of the political landscape c. 800, (Note: Ó Cróinín also points out the irony of "at no time in the historical period did the political division represented by the word cóiced... ...have a tangible existence") but when discussing the political subdivisions of Ireland at this time, it is still useful to refer to this system; if Laigin and Mide are combined as Leinster, it roughly corresponds with the modern four provinces of Ireland.

The Uí Néill, divided in two main branches known as "Northern Uí Néill" and "Southern Uí Néill", was the leading dynasty in Ireland. (Note: They may not have been as dominant in earlier history as medieval sources tend to claim, according to Ó Corráin, "The Vikings & Ireland" they :"paraded illustrious ancestors and their claim to precedence was expressed in an elaborate mythography that passed for history.") The Northern Uí Néill controlled the north-western part of Ireland, and was divided into two leading branches, the Cenél Conaill in the west and Cenél nEógain, also known as the kingdom of Ailech. Cenél nEógain had become the more powerful of the two in 789, and had expanded east and southwards, gaining control over the important monastic centre Armagh and the large sub-kingdom of Airgíalla. The traditional kingdom of Ulaid, dominated by Dál Fiatach and Dál nAraidi, was now more or less confined to the area east of the river Bann.

The central region of Mide had been dominated by what became known as the "southern Uí Néill" since the 7th century. Until the 8th century, the Síl nÁedo Sláine (also known as the kingdom of Brega) was pre-eminent, but from 728 the western dynasty of Clann Cholmáin was dominant.

In Laigin, Uí Dúnlainge was the dominant dynasty c. 800. They were closely associated with the large monastery of Kildare. Their main rival for dominance in Leinster, the Uí Cheinnselaig had not been able to claim the title king of Leinster since 728. The Uí Cheinnselaig now controlled a territory in the south-eastern part of Leinster, and had close links to the monastery of Ferns.

The kingdom of Osraige, occupying roughly the same area as the present County Kilkenny and western County Laois, was considered part of Munster until the late ninth century, when it received an independent status under king Cerball mac Dúnlainge. Munster was dominated by the Eóganachta, centred around Cashel and with Emly as ecclesiastical centre. The Dál gCais (not yet known under this name) had defeated the Corcu Modruad in 744 and taken control over the area in present County Clare from which they would later rise to dominance, but were not yet a significant power in Munster. The Eóganachta rivalled the Uí Néill in power and influence, and claimed suzerainty over the southern part of Ireland. This claim was in part anchored within the legendary ancient division of the island in Leath Cuinn and Leath Moga, "Conn's half" (north) and "Mug's half" (south).

During the 7th century the Uí Briúin had emerged in Connacht, and since the first half of the 8th century been the dominant dynasty. Uí Briúin also influenced the kingdom of Breifne on the southern borders of the Northern Uí Néill.

== First Viking age (795–902) ==
=== Early Viking raids ===
The first recorded Viking raid in Irish history occurred in AD 795 when Vikings, possibly from Norway looted the island of Lambay. (Note: Ó Corráin, The Vikings & Ireland, p. 9. The annals name the site of this attack as Rechru, a name that could mean either modern Lambay Island or Rathlin.) This was followed by a raid on the coast of Brega in 798, and raids on the coast of Connacht in 807. These early Viking raids were generally small in scale and quick.

These early raids interrupted the golden age of Christian Irish culture and marked the beginning of two hundred years of intermittent warfare, with waves of Viking raiders plundering monasteries and towns throughout Ireland. Most of the early raiders came from the fjords of western Norway. They are believed to have sailed first to Shetland, then south to Orkney. The Vikings would have then sailed down the Atlantic coast of Scotland, and then over to Ireland. During these early raids the Vikings also travelled to the west coast of Ireland to the Skellig Islands located off the coast of County Kerry. The early raids on Ireland seem to have been aristocratic free enterprise, and named leaders appear in the Irish annals: Saxolb (Soxulfr) in 837, Turges (Þurgestr) in 845, Agonn (Hákon) in 847.

=== Áed Oirdnide ===
Áed Oirdnide of the Cenél nEógain branch of the Northern Uí Néill became King of Tara in 797, after the death of his predecessor, father-in-law and political rival Donnchad Midi. (Duncan) This followed the classic Uí Néill political arrangement, where over-kingship alternated regularly between Cenél nEógain and Clann Cholmáin of the Southern Uí Néill. During his reign he campaigned in Mide, Leinster and Ulaid to assert his authority, though unlike Donnchad (Duncan) he did not campaign in Munster.

Thomas Charles-Edwards credits Áed for "the absence of any major Viking attacks on Ireland during his reign after 798". The annals give no reference, however, to Áed at any time being involved with warfare against Viking raiders.

Áed was connected to the monastic community at Armagh, and a supporter of the familia of Patrick. His rivals for supremacy within Uí Néill, the Clann Cholmáin and the Cenél Conaill, had on the other hand supported the familia of Columba. During Áed's reign the Columban familia, following several Viking raids against Iona, established a new monastery at Kells, a royal site in the possession of Armagh. Byrne states that "...the foundation [of Kells] marked the resolution of any remaining rivalry between the Columban and Patrician churches...". That the community of Columba in 817 tried to have Áed excommunicated may show that not all rivalry was resolved after all.

=== Rivalry between north and south ===
Is he Feidhlimidh in ri
dianid opair oenlaithi
eitrige Connacht cen cath
ocus Midhe do manrath
(Feidlimid is the king
For whom a single day's work is
To take the hostages of Connacht without battle
And to spoil Mide.)

— Annals of Ulster, 840.4

Fedelmid mac Crimthainn from the Eóganacht Chaisil acceded to the kingship of Munster in 820, beginning a 130-year domination by this branch of Eóganachta. Combining military campaigns with manipulation of ecclesiastical affairs, he embarked on a policy of aggressive expansion to counter the growth in power of the Uí Néill. Conchobar mac Donnchada (Duncan) succeeded Áed Oirdnide as Uí Néill overking in 819, and soon found himself challenged by Feidlimid, both by Feidlimid launching raids into Mide and Connacht and by him interfering (as would be the Uí Néill view) in the affairs of Armagh. Conchobar and Feidlimid met at Birr in 827 to discuss peace terms, and the very fact that "the king of Munster could force the high-king to a peace conference is indicative of Feidlimid's growing power".

Conchobar was succeeded by Niall Caille in 833. With Niall, we for the first time see a reference in the annals of a Uí Néill leading an army against the Vikings; he defeated Viking raiders in Derry the same year. He sought to further expand Uí Néill influence in the south; in 835 he led an army to Leinster and installed Bran mac Fáeláin as king of Leinster, and also invaded Mide. This brought him into conflict with Feidlimid, however, and in 838 a conference (rígdál mór—"great royal meeting") between Niall and Feidlimid was held. (Note: Hudson, Niall Caille. According to Hudson, "Any agreement made there has not survived, although the report of the meeting from a Munster chronicle with a bias towards the southern prince claims that Niall submitted to Feidlimid, while a contemporary northern chronicle has no report of the proceedings.") This meeting did not result in any lasting peace though; in 840 Feidlimid led an army into Mide and encamped at Tara, thereby challenging the Uí Néill also in the north. In 841, however, Feidlimid was routed in battle by Niall in Leinster. His successors in the south would not be able to challenge the north again to this extent until some 150 years later.

=== Intensified raiding and the first Viking settlements in Ireland ===
The Viking raids on Ireland resumed in 821, and intensified during the following decades. The Vikings were beginning to establish fortified encampments, longports, along the Irish coast and overwintering in Ireland instead of retreating to Scandinavia or British bases. The first known longports were at Linn Dúachaill (Annagassan) and Duiblinn (on the River Liffey, at or near present Dublin). (Note: The first report of Vikings spending the winter in Ireland is from Lough Neagh 840–41, the first overwintered in Dublin 841–42.) They were also moving further inland to attack, often using rivers such as the Shannon, and then retreating to their coastal bases. The raiding parties also increased in size, becoming regular armies—in 837 the annals report a fleet of sixty longships on the Liffey, carrying 1,500 men, and another one of a similar size sailing up the river Boyne, making their way into the inland territories and launching attacks on the lands of Brega in the south of County Meath. In general, from 837 onward larger Viking forces hit larger targets – such as the greater monastic towns of Armagh, Glendalough, Kildare, Slane, Clonard, Clonmacnoise, and Lismore – while smaller targets such as local churches with less material to be plundered may have escaped the Vikings' attention.

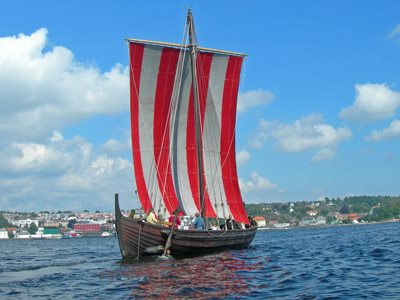
Modern replica of a Viking Knarr.

One of the first named Viking leaders was Thorgest (in Latin Turgesius). The Annals of the Four Masters connect him with attacks on Connacht, Mide and the church at Clonmacnoise in 844. He was captured and drowned in Lough Owel by Máel Sechnaill mac Maíl Ruanaid, King of Mide. However the existence of Thorgest is uncertain as he was recorded in books written over 200 years after his death in a period of strong anti-Viking sentiment. He was often depicted as a villain and his wife was said to be a witch that would perform pagan rituals on altars. It is highly likely that this was war propaganda as we have very little evidence of his existence from his own period, and it is unlikely those close to him would record this themselves.

In 848 a Norse army was defeated at Sciath Nechtain by Ólchobar mac Cináeda of Munster and Lorcán mac Cellaig of Leinster. For the first time the leader of the Vikings is described as royalty from Lochlann. Máel Sechnaill, now High King, defeated another army at Forrach the same year. These victories form the background of an embassy sent to the Frankish emperor Charles the Bald, reported in the Annales Bertiniani.

In 853 Olaf, identified as a "son of the king of Lochlann", came to Ireland. Lochlann has been understood as (a district of) present Norway; it is now considered more plausible that it refers to a Scandinavian colony in the Western Isles of Scotland. (Note: For a longer discussion on the location on Lochlann, see Ó Corráin, "The Vikings in Scotland and Ireland in the Ninth Century") Olaf assumed leadership of the Vikings in Ireland, probably in some way shared with his kinsman Ivar, first mentioned in the Irish Annals in 857. Olaf and Ivar remained active in Ireland and around the Irish Sea for the next two decades. The descendants of Ivar, the Uí Ímair, would be an important political factor for the next two centuries.

=== Shifting alliances and struggle for power ===
A significant new trait from the middle of the 9th century was that the Norse now also entered alliances with various Irish rulers. Cerball mac Dúnlainge had become king of Osraige in 842. Cerball had defeated Viking raiders in 846 and 847, but from 858 he is allied with Olaf and Ivar against Máel Sechnaill, campaigning in Leinster and Munster, and in 859 also raiding Máel Sechnaill's heartlands in Mide, though Cerball had to submit to Máel Sechnaill later the same year. These alliances were by no means permanent. In 860 Cerball was allied with Máel Sechnaill in a campaign against Áed Findliath of the Northern Uí Néill, while Olaf and Ivar had allied themselves with Áed. In 870, however, Cerball and Áed appeared as allies in Leinster.

Máel Sechnaill had more success as high king than his predecessors Niall Caille and Conchobar Donnchada (Duncan) in dealing with the south, and forced Munster into submission in 858 and as noted above, Osraige in 859. He also asserted control over Ulaid, Leinster and Connacht, and was in his obituary in the Annals of Ulster described as ri h-Erenn uile, king of all Ireland. In the last years of his reign he had however experienced serious opposition from his Uí Néill kinsmen of Ailech and Brega, allied with the Norse of Dublin. Byrne notes: "Máel Sechnaill's unprecedented success in achieving the high-kingship of all Ireland was marred by the chronic complaint of Irish politics: having united the Ulaid, Munster, Osraige, Connacht and Leinster, he was attacked at the end of his reign by a combination of Uí Néill kings."

Áed Findliath was king of Ailech and the leading king within the Northern Uí Néill. After the death of Máel Sechnaill he is counted in the regal lists as high king, following the established scheme where this alternated between Cenél nEógain in the north and Clann Cholmáin of Mide. His kingship was disputed though, and he did not come close to being an actual king over Ireland. He could count some successes against the Norse, however, most notably burning all the Norse longports in the north in 866. Áed seems to have used the opportunity while Olaf was involved in warfare in Pictland, presumably bringing a large contingent of the Norse forces in Ireland with him. The Vikings never managed to establish permanent settlements in the north. Ó Corráin observes: "Ironically, [Áed Findliath's] success may have held back the economic development of the north and ultimately prevented the growth of port towns like those on the east and south coasts, on which the Leinster and Munster kings subsequently depended for much of their wealth."

The last report of Olaf is when he and Ivar returned to Dublin in 871 from Alba. Ivar died in 873. In his obituary, the Annals of Ulster call Ivar "king of the Norsemen of all Ireland and Britain". With their disappearance, there were frequent changes of leadership among the Norse in Ireland and a great deal of internecine conflict is reported for the following decades. In 902 Máel Finnia mac Flannacain of Brega and Cerball mac Muirecáin of Leinster joined forces against Dublin, and "The heathens were driven from Ireland, i.e. from the fortress of Áth Cliath [Dublin]". (Note: AU 902.2 Note that the untranslated text reads: "Indarba n-gennti a h-Ere, .í. longport Atha Cliath o Mael Findia m. Flandacain co feraibh Bregh & o Cerball m. Muiricain co Laignibh...", that is "longport", not "fortress".)

A group of Vikings led by Hingamund who were forced out of Ireland were given permission by the Saxons to settle in Wirral, in the north west of England. "The Three Fragments" refers to a distinct group of settlers living among these Vikings as "Irishmen": "Then the King, who was on the point of death, and the Queen sent messengers to the Irishmen who were among the pagans, for there were many Irish among the pagans, to say to the Irishmen, life and health to you from the King of the Saxons, who is in disease, and from his Queen, who has all authority over the Saxons, and they are certain that you are true and trusty friends to them. Therefore, you should take their side; for they did not bestow any greater honour to a Saxon warrior or cleric than to each warrior and cleric who came to them from Ireland, because this inimical race of pagans is equally hostile to you also." Further evidence of an Irish presence in Wirral comes from the name of the village of Irby in Wirral, which means "farmstead of the Irishmen", and St Bridget's Church, West Kirby which is known to have been founded by "Christian Vikings from Ireland".

=== Failed Conquest ===
The Vikings were able to exploit internal divisions in order to invade England and France. As Ireland was one of the most politically fractured countries at the time, it was a prime target for Viking conquest. Furthermore, Irish Kings often made alliances with foreign invaders in an attempt to weaken their domestic rivals. The Vikings were able to defeat the centralized Kingdoms of Europe, since the small ruling class was easily removed. However, Ireland was composed of more than 150 different Kingdoms ruling over small territories. This decentralized system of governance made it almost impossible to gain control of a territory, since defeated Kings were easily replaced.

=== Impact on cultural activity and formation of Irish scholarly diaspora ===
Historians debate the consequences that the initial phases of Viking settlement had on scholarship and literary output. Scholarly activity, for which the Irish are famous in the early medieval period, consisted of the writing of poetry, the production of Christian devotional texts, the development of the science of computus, and the compilation of elaborate law tracts. Patronage for scholars and scholarship came largely from Irish kings who regarded the presence of court scholars as part and parcel of the trappings of kingship, but also as a means of bolstering their own image through praise poetry that such scholars composed and performed. With the advent of the Vikings, patronage ties have been argued to have been loosened, thereby affecting directly the livelihood of Irish scholars. In addition, some kings would have turned their attention to more pressing (but also more profitable) pursuits, such as engaging in warfare or alliances with Vikings or other Irish kings, as well as tapping the economic benefits that Viking trade would have brought. While this was happening in Ireland, we observe a more pronounced presence of Irish scholars in Frankish Europe, and especially in circles associated with the Carolingian court. Commonly known as peregrini, Irish scholars such as John Scottus Eriugena and Sedulius Scottus became among the most prominent and influential in ninth-century continental Europe, studying and teaching a range of subjects, from theology to political philosophy. It is tempting to link their presence on the Continent as well as the presence of scores of other Irish learned people with the impact of the Vikings on Ireland, which may have driven such people to seek employment elsewhere. If one accepts this version of events, then the Vikings can be said to have inadvertently been one of the principal catalysts for the spread of Irish culture abroad and the subsequent foundation of Irish centres on the Continent which remained influential for centuries to come.

== Second Viking age (914–980) ==
After having been forced to leave Dublin in 902, the descendants of Ivar, now described generically in the annals as the Uí Ímair, (Note: Grandsons or great grandsons of Ivar, no other patronym was given for these, which makes it difficult trace their lineage. Modern scholarly literature also refer to later descendants as "of the Uí Ímair". However, "a collective term for all the descendants of Ívarr is lacking in the medieval Irish chronicles"Downham, "Viking Kings...", p. 6.) remained active around the Irish Sea; reports tell of their activities in Pictland, Strathclyde, Northumbria and Mann. In 914 a new Viking fleet appeared in Waterford Harbour, and soon the Uí Ímair followed, again taking control over Viking activities in Ireland. Ragnall arrived with a fleet in Waterford, while Sitric landed at Cenn Fuait (possibly near Leixlip) in Leinster. Niall Glúndub had followed Flann Sinna as Uí Néill overking in 916, and he marched into Munster against Ragnall, but no decisive engagement followed. The men of Leinster under Augaire mac Ailella attacked Sithric but suffered a heavy defeat in the Battle of Confey or Cenn Fuait (917). This victory allowed Sithric to re-establish Norse control over Dublin. Ragnall left Ireland again in 918, and became king of York. (Note: The identity between the Ragnall of Waterford and Ragnall (Rögnvald) of York has been questioned, see Downham, Viking Kings of Britain and Ireland, p. 94.) With Sithric in Dublin and Ragnall in York, a Dublin-York axis developed which would have influence on both England and Ireland for the next half-century.

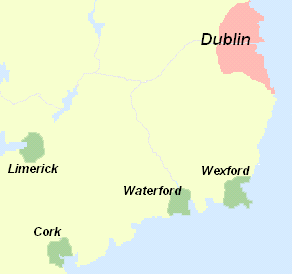
Map showing the major Norse settlements in Ireland in the 10th Century

A new and more intensive period of Viking settlement in Ireland began in 914. Between 914 and 922 the Norse established Waterford, Cork, Dublin, Wexford and Limerick. (Note: The archaeology of the early viking age in Ireland "The second and more intensive period of settlement was characterised by the establishment of a series of towns. Waterford (914), Cork (c.915), Dublin (917), Wexford (c.921) and Limerick (922).") Significant excavations in Dublin and Waterford in the 20th century have unearthed much of the Viking heritage of those cities. A large amount of Viking burial stones, called the Rathdown Slabs, have been found in multiple locations across South Dublin.

The Vikings founded many other coastal towns, and after several generations of coexistence and intermarriage a group of mixed Irish and Norse ethnic background arose (often called Norse-Gaels or Hiberno-Norse). Norse influence shows in the Norse-derived names of many contemporary Irish kings (e.g. Magnus, Lochlann or Sitric), and in DNA evidence in some residents of these coastal cities to this day. A genetics paper in 2006 by Dr Brian McEvoy found that most men with Irish-Viking surnames carried typically Irish genes. This suggests that Viking settlements may have had a Scandinavian elite but with most of the inhabitants being indigenous Irish.

Niall Glúndub marched on Dublin in September 919, but Sihtric met his forces at the battle of Islandbridge or Áth Cliath and inflicted on him a decisive defeat, with Niall and numerous other Irish leaders among the casualties. Dublin was secured for the Norse, and in 920 Sitric left for York and following Ragnall's death succeeded him as ruler there in 921. Their kinsman Gofraid assumed control of Dublin. Gofraid was active as a Viking raider and slaver, but there were signs during his reign that the Norse were not just mere Vikings any more. During a raid at Armagh in 921 Gofraid "...spared the prayerhouses... ...and the sick from destruction", considerations never taken by the raiders of the previous century. Another was the intense campaigns led by Dublin in eastern Ulster from 921 to 927, which appear to have aimed at conquest in order to create a Scandinavian kingdom like the one on the eastern side of the Irish sea.

Dublin's ambitions in Ulster were halted by a series of defeats inflicted upon the Norse by Muirchertach mac Néill, the son of Niall Glúndub. According to Benjamin Hudson, "Muirchertach was one of the most successful generals of his day and was described as the 'Hector of the Irish'". In the annals, it is (Duncan) Donnchad Donn from Clann Cholmáin who is titled "high king" after Niall however, and Muirchertach did not succeed his father as king of Ailech either until 938. Apart from his victories over the Norse, Muirchertach led campaigns forcing other provincial kingdoms into submission, most notably taking the king of Munster Cellachán Caisil captive in 941. The same year he led a fleet to the Hebrides, collecting tribute there. (Note: Hudson, "Muirchertach mac Néill (d. 943)", Hudson also notes that "As a descendant of the kings of Dál Riata, being the great-grandson of the Scottish king Cináed mac Alpin, he may have considered that he had hereditary interests in the region.")

When Sihtric died in 927 Gofraid left for York, trying to assume kingship there. He was driven out by Athelstan, and returned to Dublin half a year later. The Vikings of Limerick had taken Dublin in his absence. Gofraid retook the city, but the struggle between Limerick continued well after Gofraid's death in 934. He was succeeded by his son, Amlaíb, who inflicted a decisive defeat on Limerick in 937. The same year Amlaíb went to Northumbria and allied himself with Constantine II of Scotland and Owen I of Strathclyde. Athelstan defeated this coalition at Brunanburh (937), but after Athelstan's death in 939 Amlaíb became king of York. He was joined by a kinsman with the same name, Amlaíb son of Sihtric, known as Amlaíb Cuarán.

Congalach mac Máel Mithig, known as Cnogba, succeeded (Duncan) Donnchad Donn as Uí Néill overking in 944 (Muirchertag, who otherwise might have been the obvious successor, had been killed in 943). Congalach was king of Brega and a member of Síl nÁedo Sláine, and the first of this dynasty called "High King" since Cináed mac Írgalaig in the early 8th century. In 944 he sacked Dublin, now ruled by Blácaire mac Gofrith. When Amlaíb Cuaran returned to Ireland the next year, he became ruler of Dublin and acted as an ally of Congalach in the struggle against Ruaidrí ua Canannáin, a rival Uí Néill claimant for High Kingship from Cenél Conaill. This alliance did not last long after Ruaidrí's death in 950, however, and Congalach was killed in 956 in a battle against an alliance of Dublin and Leinster. He was succeeded by Domnall ua Néill, and in the following decades alliances shifted constantly between the different branches of Uí Néill, Leinster and Dublin.

In 980 Máel Sechnaill mac Domnaill succeeded Domnall, and the same year he defeated the forces of Dublin at the battle of Tara. Following this victory Máel Sechnaill forced Dublin into submission, and his half-brother, Amlaíbs son Glúniairn, became ruler in Dublin.

== Máel Sechnaill mac Domnaill and Brian Boru (980–1022) ==
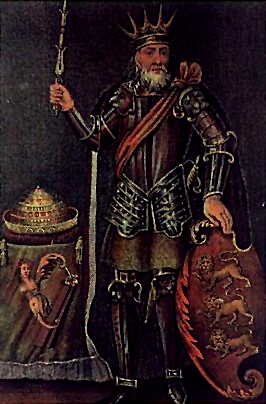
18th-century engraving of Brian Boru.

In Munster, the influence of the Dal gCais had grown under Cennétig mac Lorcáin, and his son Mathgamain was the first non-Eóganachta ruler to be named by the annals as king of Cashel (i.e. king of Munster) in historical times. He was killed in 976, and succeeded by his brother Brian, later famously known as Brian Boru.

Brian quickly established himself as the most powerful ruler in Munster, defeating the Norse of Limerick in 977 and the Eóganachta the following year. Having gained control over Munster, he tried to extend his authority by raiding Osraige in 982 and 983, and also, according to the annals of Innisfallen, entering an alliance with the Norse of Waterford, with the intention of attacking Dublin. There was such an attack, but Brian does not seem to have been involved – instead it was Domnall Claen of Leinster who was allied with Ivar of Waterford, and they were defeated by Glúniairn and Máel Sechnaill.

Máel Sechnaill obviously perceived Brian as a threat, and as early as 982 raided Munster and the territory of the Dal gCais. The next two decades saw more or less constant warfare between them, mostly with Leinster as their battleground. Even if Brian never defeated Máel Sechnaill in battle, Brian's and Munster's influence was growing at the expense of Máel Sechnaill and the Southern Uí Néill. In 997 Máel Sechnaill was forced to acknowledge Brian's authority over the south of Ireland, and they formally divided Ireland according to the traditional scheme of Leath Cuinn and Leath Moga. In the years that followed, the two of them acted as allies in accordance with this agreement. In 999 Brian quelled a revolt against him by the men of Leinster and Dublin at the battle of Glen Mama, and only restored Sigtrygg Silkbeard as ruler of Dublin after he had formally submitted to Brian by handing over hostages.

In 1000, Brian turned against Máel Sechnaill, and by 1002 he had forced Máel Sechnaill to submit to him, and now claimed kingship over the whole of Ireland. In the following decade, there were several campaigns in the north to force the Ulaid and the Northern Uí Néill into submission as well. Even if faced with multiple rebellions, both in the north and in Leinster, by 1011 he had received submission from every major regional king in Ireland, and thus earned the recognition by historians as the first real king of Ireland. During his visit to Armagh in 1005, he had his secretary add a note to the Book of Armagh where he is proclaimed as Imperator Scottorum (emperor of the Irish). According to Bart Jaski, "This can be regarded as a claim that he ruled both the Irish and the Norse in Ireland, and may even imply suzerainty over the Gaels of Scotland". In his obituary in the Annals of Ulster he is styled as "over-king of the Irish of Ireland, and of the foreigners and of the Britons, the Augustus of the whole of north-west Europe".

In 1012, Flaithbertach Ua Néill revolted against Brian, and the following year Máel Mórda of Leinster and Sigtrygg of Dublin did too. The latter led to the famous battle of Clontarf, where Brian was killed, even if his army was victorious over Máel Mórda, Sigtrygg and their allies. Sigurd Hlodvirsson, Earl of Orkney as well as forces from Man participated on the Dublin/ Leinster side, and this may, in conjunction with the propagandistic account of the battle given in the Cogad, have created the still popular myth that what took place at Clontarf Good Friday 1014 was a decisive battle where the Irish defeated Viking invaders and were liberated from oppression. (Duncan) Donnchadh Ó Corráin was one of the first to publicly debunk this national myth, in his groundbreaking Ireland before the Normans from 1972:

The battle of Clontarf was not a struggle between the Irish and the Norse for the sovereignty of Ireland; neither was it a great national victory which broke the power of the Norse forever (long before Clontarf the Norse had become a minor political force in Irish affairs). In fact Clontarf was part of the internal struggle for sovereignty and was essentially the revolt of the Leinstermen against the dominance of Brian, a revolt in which their Norse allies played an important but secondary role.

— Donnchadh Ó Corráin (Note: Quoted from Duffy, "Ireland, c. 1000 – c. 1100", p. 288. After quoting Ó Corráin, Duffy states that:"...Few now, beyond the ranks of the purveyors of popular fiction, perpetuate the portrayal of Brian, eliminator of the viking scourge" – which may be an overly optimistic assertion from Duffy.)

Following Brian's death, Máel Sechnaill resumed as High King, supported by Flaithbertach ua Néill. (Note: AU 1015.2: "Flaithbertach ua Néill went into Mide to assist Mael Sechnaill." This seem to contradict Byrne (p. 864): "..since 970 the Northern and Southern Uí Néill were... ...irreconcilable foes...") In Munster, internal strife almost immediately began between Brian's sons Donnchad and Tadc, and Dúngal Ua Donnchada of Eóganachta also claimed the kingship of the province. Though Donnchad (Duncan) eventually was victorious, the descendants of Brian would not be able to make a real claim to kingship over Ireland again until Toirdelbach Ua Briain. In Leinster, the defeat at Clontarf and death of Máel Mórda seriously weakened the Uí Dúnlainge, and opened the way for a new Uí Cheinnselaig dominance in the region. Despite the defeat at Clontarf, Sigtrygg remained ruler of Dublin until 1036.

== High kings with opposition (1022 onwards) ==
Conchobur clannmin, fo-chen!
Áed, Gairbith, Diarmait durgen,
Donnchad, dá Níall cen snim snéid
rig na ré sea co roreid.
(Smooth-haired Conchobar, welcome!
Áed, Garbith, hardy Diarmait,
Donnchad, two Nialls without swift sorrow,
are evidently the kings of this era.)

— From Rédig dam, a Dé do nim, poem by Flann Mainistrech from 1056

(Duncan) Donnchad mac Brian styled himself as 'King of Ireland' after the death of Máel Sechnaill, but failed to gain recognition as such. A glossing of Baile In Scáil lists Flaitbertach Ua Néill as high king, but he proved unable even to control the north of Ireland. Neither was anyone else able to make a recognised claim for kingship over all of Ireland: according to Byrne, "what distinguished the great interregnum of 1022–72 from other periods in Irish history is that it was recognised as such by contemporary observers".

Flann Mainistrech had written Ríg Themra tóebaige iar tain, a regnal poem on the Christian (Uí Néill) kings of Tara some time between 1014 and 1022. When he wrote in 1056 he evidently did not know any high king of Ireland, and instead lists a number of kings of the day: (Duncan) Conchobar, Áed, Garbith, Diarmait, Donnchad (Duncan) and two Nialls. According to Byrne, these are Conchobar Ua Maíl Schechnaill of Mide, Áed Ua Conchobair of Connacht, Garbíth Ua Cathassaig of Brega, Diarmait mac Maíl na mBó of Leinster, Donnchad (Duncan) Mac Briain of Munster, Niall mac Máel Sechnaill of Ailech and Niall mac Eochada of Ulaid.

The term rí Érenn co fressarba ("High kings with opposition") was used from the 12th century. According to Byrne, "it could be argued that the 'high kings with opposition' met with opposition precisely because they tried to become kings of Ireland in a real sense. They were not less successful than their predecessors, but only seemed so in the light of the teaching of the schools". Following a similar line of reasoning, Byrne suggests that the focus from historians on the decline of the Uí Néill in the 11th century may be a "tribute to the success of their own propaganda". After Brian, the previous Uí Néill monopoly of high kingship as described in poems and chronicles was anyway broken for good. The Cenél nEógain suffered from internal factions, and this allowed the Ulaid, under Niall mac Eochada, to expand their influence. Niall and Diarmait mac Maíl na mBó became allies, and effectively controlled the whole east coast of Ireland. This alliance helped to make it possible for Diarmait to take direct control of Dublin in 1052. Unlike Máel Sechnaill in 980 or Brian in 999, he wasn't content with just looting the city and expelling the Hiberno-Norse ruler (Echmarcach mac Ragnaill); in an unprecedented move he assumed the kingship "of the foreigners" (ríge Gall) himself.

== Reform of the Irish Church ==
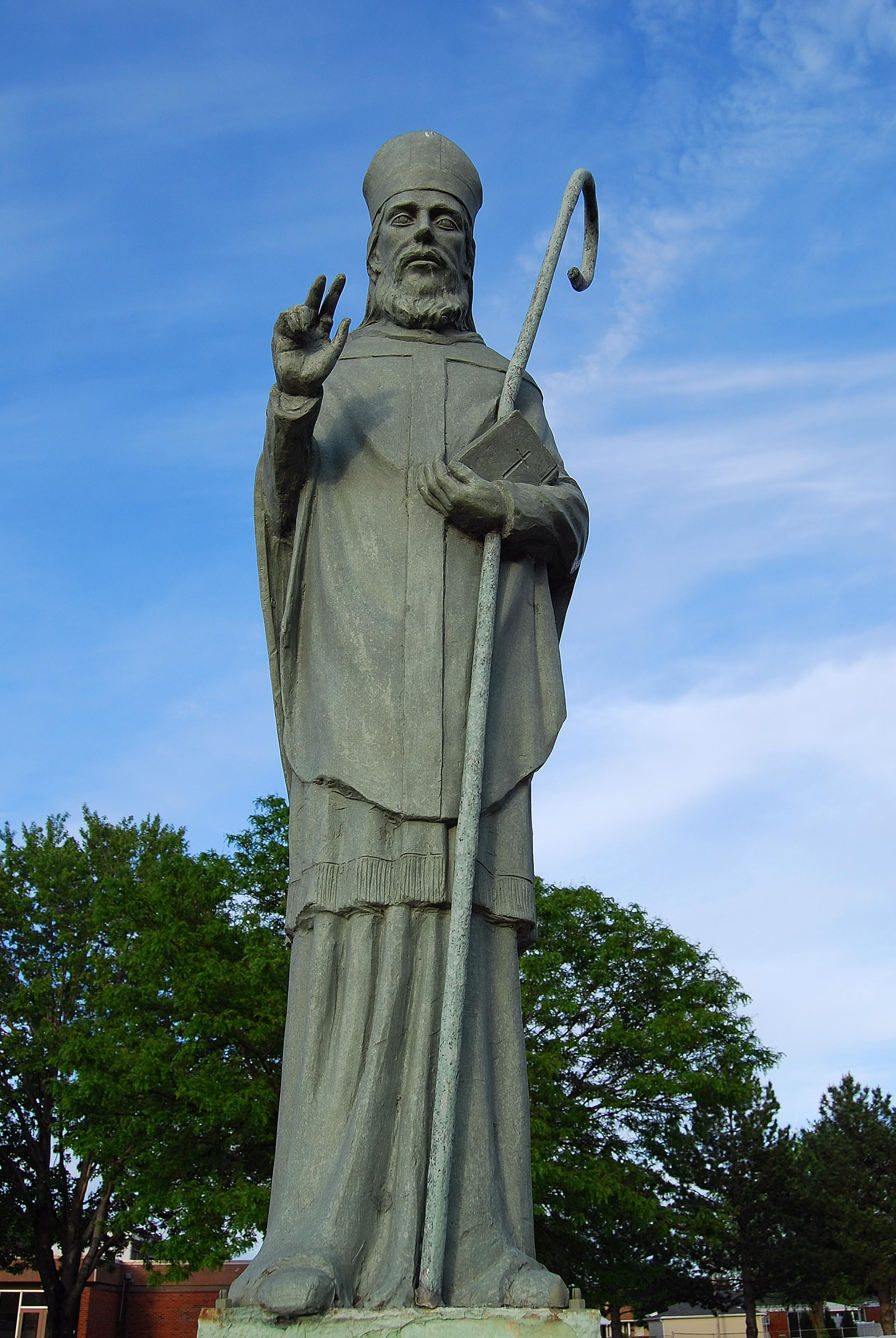
St. Malachy was an influential 12th-century reformist ecclesiastic in Ireland.

There were major reforms in the Irish church during the 12th century. These reforms have been generally interpreted as a reaction to previous secularisation, but could also be seen as a continuous development. The reforms had consequences for, and were influenced by, relations within the church as well as secular politics.

Before the 11th century the church in Ireland was monastic, with bishops residing at monasteries and without a permanent diocesan structure. The circumstances surrounding the foundation of the diocese of Dublin early in the century are obscure, but at some point during the reign of Sithric Silkbeard Dúnán became Bishop of Dublin, thus establishing the first proper diocese in Ireland. His successor Gilla Pátraic was consecrated by Lanfranc, Archbishop of Canterbury, and on that occasion Lanfranc sent letters to Toirdelbach Ua Briain and Gofraid urging reforms, in particular regarding the consecration of bishops and the abolition of simony. There is no evidence of Canterbury claiming primacy over the church in Ireland prior to this, and neither Lanfranc nor Anselm ever made direct primatial claims for Canterbury in relation to the Irish church.

Toirdelbach appears to have responded favourably to this, and convened a synod in Dublin in 1080 – the outcome of this synod is not known. Toirdelbach may have seen cooperation with Canterbury as a way to reduce the influence from Armagh, traditionally dominated by Cenél nEógain, within the church in Ireland. Gilla Pátraic's successors Donngus Ua hAingliu and Samuel Ua hÁingliu were also consecrated in Canterbury, and so was the first bishop of Waterford, Máel Ísu Ua hAinmire in 1096. The written request for Máel Ísu's consecration, as preserved in Eadmer's Historia Novorum, is subscribed by bishops from Munster, Mide, Dublin and Leinster. Gilla Espaic, the first bishop of Limerick, was however not consecrated in Canterbury, but probably by Cellach of Armagh. (Note: Gilla received a letter from Anselm congratulating him on his elevation to the see of Limerick, and there was no suggestion that Anselm felt Canterbury had been slighted or ought to have been involved. Flanagan, p. 915.)

The first of the four main synods associated with the church reforms of the 12th century took place in Cashel in 1101, at the instigation of Muirchertach Ua Briain. How many who actually attended this synod is not known, but some of its decrees have been preserved. There is a decree on simony, on prohibition for laymen to become airchinnig (heads of ecclesiastical establishments) and finally a decree that defines what relationships are considered to be incestuous. None of these decrees are radical, but they are generally interpreted to be in line with the Gregorian reform.

The second synod was the Synod of Rathbreasail. This synod, presided by Gilla Espaic as papal legate and attended by fifty bishops, three hundred priests and over three thousand laymen, marked the transition of the Irish church from a monastic to a diocesan and parish-based church. It established two provinces, with archbishoprics at Armagh and Cashel, and prominence given to Armagh, making Cellach the primate of the church in Ireland. Each province consisted of twelve territorial dioceses. The see of Dublin was not included, as this was under primacy from Canterbury, (Note: The see of Waterford however, where the incumbent bishop Máel Ísu Ua hAinmire also had been consecrated in, and taken vows of obedience to, Canterbury, was moved to Lismore, and Máel Ísu chosen as the first archbishop of Cashel.) but a place was left open for it, in the sense that only eleven dioceses were declared under Cashel.

Gilla, Cellach and Cellach's successor Máel Máedóc Ua Morgair, better known as St. Malachy, drove the reform process onwards. Malachy, in close cooperation with (Duncan) Donnchad Ua Cerbaill, king of Fernmag/Airgialla, established the first Irish Cistercian house at Mellifont in 1142, and also facilitated the first Augustinian community of the Arrouaisian observance. Malachy used these as agencies of monastic reform within the Irish church. Malachy resigned as archbishop of Armagh in 1136, but was appointed native papal legate to Ireland by Innocent II in 1139.

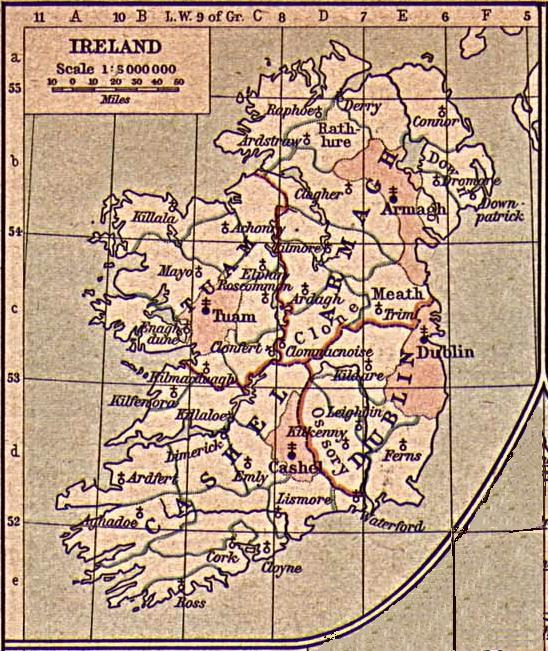
Maps of dioceses in Ireland as defined by the synod of Kells. From Historical Atlas by William R. Shepherd.

No formal attempts on getting papal approval for the structure chosen at Rathbreasail are known before Malachy sought pallia for the two incumbent archbishops at Cashel and Armagh during his trip to the Continent in 1139/40. This first bid was unsuccessful, but Malachy was told to reapply after he had gained the agreement of all Ireland. Before undertaking his second trip to the Continent in 1148, Malachy convened a synod at St Patrick's Island. The main challenge must have been to reach an accommodation with Dublin, and Tairrdelbach Ua Conchobair, presently the most powerful king in Ireland, was eager to increase Connacht influence on the church. The solution reached was to extend the number of metropolitan sees from two to four, with Tuam and Dublin included alongside Cashel and Armagh. Malachy died on his way to meet the pope, but the message was transmitted by other means and papal approval was granted. Pope Eugene III appointed cardinal John Paparo as papal legate, and sent him to Ireland with pallia for the four archbishops.

Cardinal Paparo's first attempt to reach Ireland was stalled when king Stephen refused him safe conduct through England unless he pledged himself to do nothing in Ireland that would injure England's interests there. This was not acceptable for Paparo, who returned to Rome. It seems likely that this was an attempt by Stephen to prevent Paparo from bringing papal confirmation for an arrangement in Ireland that would finally extinguish Canterbury's claims in Ireland. In 1151 he returned and this time reached Ireland, his journey being facilitated by David I of Scotland. The Synod of Kells-Mellifont was convened in 1152, with Paparo presiding as papal legate. The decrees from the synod are no longer extant, but some information is preserved through the Annals of the Four Masters and Geoffrey Keating's Foras Feasa ar Éirinn. The main result of the synod was the official papal sanctioning of the episcopal structure as created in 1111 and refined in 1148.

== Norman invasion ==
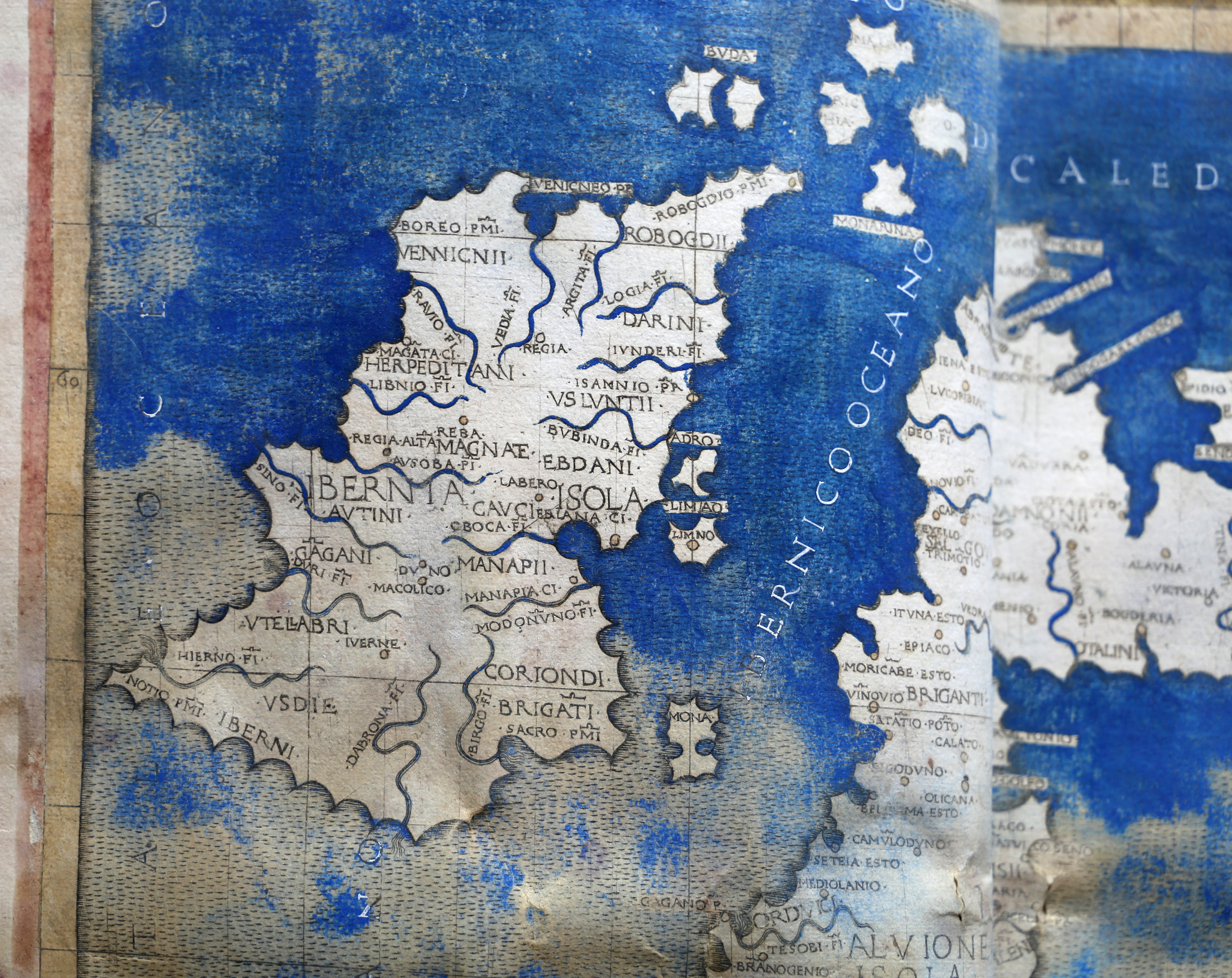
Ireland in 1482

The Norman invasion of Ireland was a two-stage process, which began on 1 May 1169 when a force of individual Norman knights led by Raymond Fitzgerald landed near Bannow, County Wexford. This was at the request of Dermot MacMurrough (Diarmait Mac Murchada), the ousted King of Leinster who sought their help in regaining his kingdom.

Then on 18 October 1171, Henry II landed a much bigger force in Waterford to at least ensure his continuing control over the Norman force. In the process he took Dublin and had accepted the fealty of the Irish kings and bishops by 1172, so creating the "Lordship of Ireland", which formed part of his Angevin Empire.

== See also ==
- Early Scandinavian Dublin
- Great Ireland
- History of Ireland
- Scandinavian Scotland
- Papar
- O'Donnell dynasty
- MacDunleavy (dynasty)

== Notes and references ==
=== References ===
Footnotes

Bibliography

- Annals of Innisfallen, CELT: Corpus of Electronic Texts, 2000
- Annals of the Four Masters, CELT: Corpus of Electronic Texts, 2002
- Annals of Ulster AD 431–1201, CELT: Corpus of Electronic Texts, 2003
- Chronicon Scotorum, CELT: Corpus of Electronic Texts, 2003
- Bracken, Damian (2004), "Feidlimid mac Crimthainn (d. 847)", Oxford Dictionary of National Biography, Oxford: Oxford University Press
- Breatnach, Caoimhín (2005). "Historical tales". In Seán Duffy (ed.). Medieval Ireland. An Encyclopedia. Abingdon and New York. pp. 221–22.
- Byrne, Francis John (2005), "Church and politics, c. 750 – c. 1100", in Ó Cróinín, Dáibhí (ed.), Prehistoric and Early Ireland, A New History of Ireland, vol. I, Oxford: Oxford University Press, pp. 654–79, ISBN 978-0-19-922665-8
- Byrne, Francis John (2005), "The Viking Age", in Ó Cróinín, Dáibhí (ed.), Prehistoric and Early Ireland, A New History of Ireland, vol. I, Oxford: Oxford University Press, pp. 609–34, ISBN 0-19-922665-2
- Byrne, Francis John (2005), "Ireland and her neighbours, c. 1014 – c. 1072", in Ó Cróinín, Dáibhí (ed.), Prehistoric and Early Ireland, A New History of Ireland, vol. I, Oxford: Oxford University Press, pp. 862–98, ISBN 0-19-922665-2
- Charles-Edwards, T. M. (2004), "Áed Oirdnide mac Néill (d. 819)", Oxford Dictionary of National Biography, Oxford: Oxford University Press
- Downham, Clare (2007), Viking Kings of Britain and Ireland: The Dynasty of Ívarr to A.D. 1014, Edinburgh: Dunedin, ISBN 978-1-903765-89-0
- Downham, Clare (2009). ""Hiberno-Norwegians" and "Anglo-Danes": Anachronistic Ethnicities in Viking Age England" (PDF). Mediaeval Scandinavia: 139–69.
- Downham, Clare (2017), Medieval Ireland, Cambridge: Cambridge University Press, ISBN 9781107651654
- Duffy, Seán (1992). "Irishmen and Islesmen in the Kingdom of Dublin and Man 1052-1171". Ériu. 43 (43): 93–133. JSTOR 30007421.
- Duffy, Sean (2009), "Ireland, c. 1000 – c. 1100", in Stafford, Pauline (ed.), A Companion to the Early Middle Ages: Britain and Ireland, c. 500 – c. 1100, Blackwell Publishing Ltd, pp. 285–302, ISBN 978-1-4051-0628-3
- Duffy, Seán (2004). "Brian Bóruma (Brian Boru) (c. 941–1014)". Oxford Dictionary of National Biography (online ed.). Oxford University Press. doi:10.1093/ref:odnb/3377. (Subscription, Wikipedia Library access or UK public library membership required.)
- Flanagan, Marie Therese (2005), "High-kings with opposition, 1072–1166", in Ó Cróinín, Dáibhí (ed.), Prehistoric and Early Ireland, A New History of Ireland, vol. I, Oxford: Oxford University Press, pp. 899–933, ISBN 0-19-922665-2
- Flechner, Roy; Meeder, Sven, eds. (2016), The Irish in Early Medieval Europe: Identity, Culture and Religion, London: Palgrave Macmillan, ISBN 9781137430595
- Hadley, Dawn (2009), "Viking Raids and Conquest", in Stafford, Pauline (ed.), A Companion to the Early Middle Ages: Britain and Ireland, c.500–c.1100, Blackwell Publishing Ltd, pp. 195–211, ISBN 978-1-4051-0628-3
- Holland, Martin (2005). "Cashel, synod of I (1101)". In Seán Duffy (ed.). Medieval Ireland. An Encyclopedia. Abingdon and New York. pp. 65–66.
- Holland, Martin (2005). "Cashel, synod of II (1172)". In Seán Duffy (ed.). Medieval Ireland. An Encyclopedia. Abingdon and New York. pp. 66–67.
- Holland, Martin (2005). "Church reform, Twelfth century". In Seán Duffy (ed.). Medieval Ireland. An Encyclopedia. Abingdon and New York. pp. 83–86.
- Holland, Martin (2005). "Gille (Gilbert) of Limerick". In Seán Duffy (ed.). Medieval Ireland. An Encyclopedia. Abingdon and New York. pp. 198–99.
- Holland, Martin (2005). "Kells, synod of". In Seán Duffy (ed.). Medieval Ireland. An Encyclopedia. Abingdon and New York. pp. 247–49.
- Hudson, Benjamin T. (2004). "Niall mac Áeda [Niall Caille] (d. 846)". Oxford Dictionary of National Biography. Oxford Dictionary of National Biography (online ed.). Oxford: Oxford University Press. doi:10.1093/ref:odnb/20076. (Subscription, Wikipedia Library access or UK public library membership required.)
- Hudson, Benjamin T. (2004). "Muirchertach mac Néill (d. 943)". Oxford Dictionary of National Biography. Oxford Dictionary of National Biography (online ed.). Oxford: Oxford University Press. doi:10.1093/ref:odnb/19502. (Subscription, Wikipedia Library access or UK public library membership required.)
- Hughes, Kathleen (2005), "The Irish Church, 800 – c. 1050", in Ó Cróinín, Dáibhí (ed.), Prehistoric and Early Ireland, A New History of Ireland, vol. I, Oxford: Oxford University Press, pp. 635–79, ISBN 0-19-922665-2
- Hughes, Kathleen (1972), Early Christian Ireland. Introduction to the sources, London and Ithaca NY, pp. 99–159
- Johnston, Elva (2013), Literacy and Identity in Early Medieval Ireland, Woodbridge: The Boydell Press, ISBN 9781843838555
- McEvoy, Brian, Claire Brady, Laoise T Moore and Daniel G Bradley; Brady, C; Moore, L. T.; Bradley, D. G. (2006). "The scale and nature of Viking settlement in Ireland from Y-chromosome admixture analysis". European Journal of Human Genetics. 14 (12): 1288–94. doi:10.1038/sj.ejhg.5201709. PMID 16957681.
- McNeill, T.E. (2005). "Archaeology". In Seán Duffy (ed.). Medieval Ireland. An Encyclopedia. Abingdon and New York. pp. 24–26.
- Ó Corráin, Donnchadh (1978), "Nationality and Kingship in Pre-Norman Ireland", in T.W. Moody (ed.), Historical Studies XI: Nationality and the pursuit of national independence, papers read before the Conference held at Trinity College, Dublin, 26–31 May 1975, Belfast: Appletree Press
- Ó Corráin, Donnchadh (1998), "The Vikings in Scotland and Ireland in the Ninth Century" (PDF), Peritia, vol. 12, Belgium: Brepols, pp. 296–339, doi:10.1484/J.Peri.3.334, ISBN 2-503-50624-0
- Ó Corráin, Donnchadh, Vikings & Ireland (PDF)
- Ó Corráin, Donnchadh (2001), "The Vikings in Ireland", in Larsen, Anne-Christine (ed.), The Vikings in Ireland, Roskilde: The Viking Ship Museum, pp. 17–29, ISBN 0-19-922665-2
- Ó Cróinín, Dáibhí (2005), "Ireland 400–800", in Ó Cróinín, Dáibhí (ed.), Prehistoric and Early Ireland, A New History of Ireland, vol. I, Oxford: Oxford University Press, pp. 182–234, ISBN 978-0-19-922665-8
- Viking Network Ireland, The archaeology of the early viking age in Ireland, archived from the original on 28 January 2010
- Wallace, Patrick F. (2005), "The archaeology of ireland's Viking-age towns", in Ó Cróinín, Dáibhí (ed.), Prehistoric and Early Ireland, A New History of Ireland, vol. I, Oxford: Oxford University Press, pp. 814–41, ISBN 978-0-19-922665-8
- Woolf, Alex (2007), From Pictland to Alba, 789–1070, The New Edinburgh History of Scotland, vol. 2, Edinburgh: Edinburgh University Press, ISBN 978-0-7486-1234-5
