= Mór Ní Briain =

Queen of Connacht

Mór Ní Briain was Queen of Connacht, and died 1218. She was a daughter of King Domnall Mór Ua Briain of Thomond (died 1194). Domnall's wife was Órlaith Ní Murchadha, Princess of Leinster, daughter of Queen Mor Ui Thuathail and King Diarmaid Mac Murchadha of Leinster.

Mór's siblings included:

- Muirchertach Finn, King of Thomond 1194-1198 and 1202/1203-1208/1210, died 1239.
- Conchobar Ruadh, King of Thomond 1198-1202/1203, killed 1202/1203.
- Donnchadh Cairprech, King of Thomond 1208/1210–1242.
- Princess (Ní Briain) of Thomond who married William de Burgh.

She was a niece of Aoife of Leinster, a first cousin to Isabel de Clare, 4th Countess of Pembroke and an aunt of Richard Mór de Burgh. Relatives included Archbishop Lorcán Ua Tuathail, Cormac mac Art O Melaghlain, Brian Ua Néill, Ruadhri Ua Flaithbertaigh, and William Marshal, 2nd Earl of Pembroke.

Her ancestors included High King of Ireland Niall of the Nine Hostages (fl. 4th/early 5th century), High King of Ireland Brian Boru (died 1014), King Énnae Cennsalach of Leinster (fl. 5th century), Bé Binn inion Urchadh of Maigh Seóla (fl. early 10th century) and Gormflaith ingen Murchada. Other ancestors may have included Sigtrygg Silkbeard, Ingjald Helgasson and Ragnar Lodbrok.

Mór married Cathal Crobdearg Ua Conchobair, who ruled as King of Connacht in opposition (1189–1202) and solely (1202–24). The marriage was unusual as she was Cathal's only wife; in contrast, most Gaelic rulers had a number of wives at the same time.

She was mother to Aedh mac Cathal Crobdearg Ua Conchobair and Felim Ua Conchobair, both of whom would become Kings of Connacht. The senior line of the family, O'Conor Don - who survives to this day - descend from her.

== See also ==
- Mór (Irish name)
- Domnall Mór Ua Briain
- Aedh Ua Conchobair
- Felim Ua Conchobair
