= Órlaith =

- Pronunciation: /ˈɔːrlə/ OR-lə
- Gender: Feminine

Origin
- Origin: Ireland
- Meaning: Golden Princess

Other names
- Alternative spelling: Órfhlaith, Órla
- Anglicisation: Orla

Órlaith (/ˈɔːrlə/ OR-lə; also spelled Órfhlaith or Órla) is a feminine Irish given name. The meaning of the name derives from the Irish words ór "golden" and flaith "prince", though since names formed with "flaith" are almost exclusively feminine, it is usually interpreted as meaning "princess". The name is sometimes anglicised as Orla or Orlagh.

== Notable people ==
- Órfhlaith Begley, Sinn Fein Member of Parliament for the West Tyrone constituency in the House of Commons.
- Órfhlaith Foyle, Irish author.
- Órlaith íngen Cennétig, Queen of Ireland, died 941 (executed).
- Órlaith Ní Maoil Seachnaill, Queen of Midhe, died 1066.
- Órlaith Nic Cennétich, died 1104.
- Órlaith Ní Mael Sechlainn, Queen of Connacht, died 1115.
- Órlaith Ní Diarmata, Princess of Moylurg, died 1252.
- Órlaith Ní Conchobair, Princess of Connacht and Abbess, died 1283.
- Orláith Forsythe, member of the Belfast-based band Dea Matrona.

== See also ==
- List of Irish-language given names
- Orla
