= Bé Binn inion Urchadh =

Princess of the Uí Briúin Seóla and Queen of Thomond

Bé Binn iníon Urchadha (or Beibhinn) was a Princess of the Uí Briúin Seóla and Queen of Thomond (fl. early 10th century); she was the mother of Brian Boru.

Bé Binn was a daughter of King Urchadh mac Murchadha of Maigh Seóla (reigned 891?-943). She was married to King Cennétig mac Lorcáin of Thomond (died 951). Cennétig is known to have had as many as eleven sons and at least one daughter, Órlaith íngen Cennétig (Queen of Ireland, died 941). The only child positively assigned to her by Cennétig - who had a number of wives - was High King of Ireland, Brian Boru (c. 941–23 April 1014). This makes Bé Binn ancestor to all subsequent Dál gCais O'Briens and their offshoots.

After the death of Cennétig, she appears to have been remarried to a king of the Corco Modhruadh (Corcomroe), a region in north-west County Clare. By him she had Lochlann and Conchobar, ancestors of the Ó Lochlainn and Ó Conchubhair Corcomroe.

Her sister Creassa iníon Urchadha was a wife of King Tadg mac Cathail of Connacht, while another sister, Caineach iníon Urchadha, appears to have married the ancestor of the Clann Coscraig sept of the Uí Briúin Seóla. Her brother, Donnchadh, succeeded their father as king.

== See also ==
- Bébinn

== Sources ==
- West or H-Iar Connaught Ruaidhrí Ó Flaithbheartaigh, 1684 (published 1846, ed. James Hardiman).
- Origin of the Surname O'Flaherty, Anthony Matthews, Dublin, 1968, p. 40.
- Irish Kings and High-Kings, Francis John Byrne (2001), Dublin: Four Courts Press, ISBN 978-1-85182-196-9
- The Great Book of Irish Genealogies, Dubhaltach Mac Fhirbhish: Edited, with translation and indices by Nollaig Ó Muraíle Five volumes. Dublin, DeBurca, 2004–2005. ISBN 0 946130 36 1.
