= Creassa inion Urchadh =

Princess of the Uí Briúin Seóla and Queen of Connacht

Creassa inion Urchadh Princess of the Uí Briúin Seóla and Queen of Connacht, fl. early 10th century.

Creassa was a daughter of King Urchadh mac Murchadh of Maigh Seóla (reigned 891?-943). She was married to King Tadg mac Cathail of Connacht (reigned 925-956). By him, she had sons Conchobar mac Tadg, Máel Ruanaid Mór mac Tadg and Tadg.

Each of her three sons would found important Connacht dynasties; Máel Ruanaid Mór's would become Kings of Moylurg, while Tadg's descendants would become royal marshals and bodyguards of the kings of Connacht, such as Fearghal Ó Taidg an Teaghlaigh.

The most notable would descend from Conchobar, whose descendants would take his name as their surname, O'Conor. This line of the family would remain Kings of Connacht into the 15th century; two of them – Toirdelbach Ua Conchobair (1088–1156) and Ruaidrí Ua Conchobair (died 1198) – would become High Kings of Ireland.

Her sisters Bé Binn inion Urchadh and Caineach inion Urchadh similarly made good marriages, while her brother, Donnchadh mac Urchadh was King of Maigh Seóla (943-959). He was the ancestor of the O'Flaherty family and their related septs.
