= Mór ingen Donnchadha =

Mór ingen Donnchadha was the Queen of Ireland. She died in 986 AD.

== See also ==
- Mór (Irish name)
