= Mór (given name) =

Mór or Mor is a unisex given name. Mór was a common Irish language feminine given name during the medieval period which has now fallen out of use, though it survives in its diminutive Móirín, which was anglicised to Moreen.

People with the name include:

== Pre-modern world ==
- Mór ingen Cearbhaill (died 916), Queen of Laigin
- Mór ingen Donnchadha (died 986), Queen of Ireland
- Mór ingen Taidhg an Tuir (died 992), Queen of Ireland
- Mór Ní Briain (died 1137), Queen of Connacht
- Mór Ní Tuathail (c. 1114–1191), Queen-consort of Leinster
- Mór Muman (name)

== Modern world ==
- Mór Adler (1826–1902), Hungarian artist
- Mor Bulis (born 1996), Israeli tennis player
- Mor Dahan (born 1989), Israeli footballer
- Mor Diouf (born 1988), Senegalese footballer
- Mór Jókai (1825–1904), Hungarian dramatist and novelist
- Mor Karbasi, Israeli singer and songwriter
- Mor Katzir (born 1980), an Israeli model
- Mór Kóczán (1885–1972), Hungarian javelin thrower
- Mór Than (1828–1899), Hungarian painter
- Mór Perczel (1811–1899), Hungarian landholder, general, and one of the leaders of the Hungarian Revolution of 1848
- Mor Sæther (1793–1851), Norwegian herbalist
- Mor Shushan (born 1988), Israeli footballer
- Mór Ungerleider (1872–1955), Hungarian cafe owner and co-founder of an early film distribution company; first person to show a film in Hungary

== See also ==
- List of Irish-language given names
