= 10th century in Ireland =

Events from the 10th century in Ireland.

== 900s ==
900

- Death of Tadg mac Conchobair, King of Connacht
- Death of Litan, abbot of Tuam

902

- Dublin has been abandoned - the end of the Longphort phase - the term used by modern scholars to refer to the earliest period of Viking settlement at Dublin

904

- Mughroin mac Sochlachan, 30th King of Uí Maine, died.

908

- 13 September - Flann Sinna slew Cormac mac Cuilennáin, the king-bishop of Cashel and King of Munster, at the battle of Belach Mughna, in Leinster.

909

- Death of Sochlachan mac Diarmata, 31st King of Uí Maine.
- Death of Cerball mac Muirecáin, King of Leinster

== 910s ==
911

- Drogheda is established as a Viking settlement on the River Boyne.

911 or 914

- A large Viking fleet arrives in Waterford and a second period of Viking raids begins. The Vikings also established a base in Waterford.

916

- 25 May: death of Flann Sinna (b 847 or 848), the son of Máel Sechnaill mac Máele Ruanaid of Clann Cholmáin, a branch of the southern Uí Néill. He was King of Mide from 877 onwards, following Donnchad mac Eochocain, and is counted as a High King of Ireland
- Death of Mór ingen Cearbhaill, Queen of Laigin.

917

- The Annals of Ulster records the arrival of two Viking fleets in Ireland in 917, one led by Ragnall and the other by Sigtrygg, both of the Uí Ímair kindred. They fought a battle against Niall Glundub in which the Irish were routed, and according to the annals Sigtrygg then "entered Áth Cliath", i.e. Dublin, which we must assume means that he took possession of it. Ragnall Uí Ímair went on to Scotland, and then conquered York and became king there.

919

- Niall Glúndub, overking of the Uí Néill, killed in the battle of Dublin. He fell fighting the Dublin Norse at Islandbridge.

== 920s ==
922

- The Vikings establish a Longphort in Limerick.
- Death of Muiredach Mac Domhnaill, abbot of Monasterboice, under whose auspices the great high cross was made.

925

- Death of Tadg mac Cathail, King of Connacht.

926 or 941

- Brian Boru (d.1014), future High King of Ireland is thought to have been born in 926 or in 941.

927

- Death of Sigtrygg Caech (or Sihtric), a Norse-Gael King of Dublin who later reigned as king of York. His epithet means the 'Squinty'. He belonged to the Uí Ímair kindred.

928

- Viking massacre of native Irish in Dunmore Caves in County Kilkenny.

== 930s ==
936

- Death of Sochlachan mac Diarmata, 32nd King of Uí Maine.

== 940s ==
944

- Death of Donnchad Donn mac Flainn, King of Mide; he is succeeded by Oengus mac Donnchada.

== 950s ==
956

- Death of Congalach Cnogba, High King of Ireland, of the Síl nÁedo Sláine, part of the Southern Uí Néill. Domnall ua Néill becomes overking of the Uí Néill and reigns until his death in 980.

== 960s ==
960

- Gormflaith was born in Naas, County Kildare. She was the daughter of Murchad mac Find, King of Leinster. She was also the mother of King Sigtrygg Silkbeard of Dublin.
- Death of Murchadh mac Aodha, 33rd King of Uí Maine.

964

- Mathgamain mac Cennetig, leader of the Dál gCais from east Clare, captures Cashel from the Eóganachta.

968

- Battle of Sulcoit where Brian Boru and Mathgamain defeat Ivar of Limerick.

== 970s ==
970

- A hoard of 43 silver and bronze items was left in a rocky cleft deep in Dunmore Caves near Kilkenny. It consisted of silver, ingots and conical buttons woven from fine silver and was discovered in 1999.

976

- Mathgamain, leader of the Dál gCais from east Clare, is killed.
- Death of Muirchertach mac Mael Sechnaill, King of Mide.

977

- Brian Bóruma has Ivar of Limerick killed.

977/8

- Brian Bóruma defeats the last independent Norse of Limerick in the Battle of Cathair Cuan.

978

- Brian Bóruma defeats Máel Muad mac Brain in the Battle of Belach Lechta and becomes King of Munster; death of Máel Muad mac Brain.

== 980s ==
980

- Death of Domnall ua Néill, overking of the Uí Néill, who had reigned since 956: he is succeeded by Mael Seachnaill II, who reigned until his death in 1022
- Battle of Tara, at which Mael Seachnaill II defeats a Viking army from Dublin.

981

- Mael Seachnaill II besieges and takes the city of Dublin from the Vikings and imposes a heavy tribute on them.

982

- The King of Munster, Brian Boru starts extending his authority from his base around Limerick up the River Shannon. By doing so, he comes into conflict with High King Mael Seachnaill II whose power base is the Province of Meath. It is that start of a conflict that lasts until 997.

985

- Death of Muirgus mac Domnaill, 35th King of Uí Maine.

986

- Death of Mór ingen Donnchadha, Queen of Ireland

989

- Sigtrygg Silkbeard becomes King of Dublin

== 990s ==
990

- Castlekeeran raided by the Vikings.

997

- Brian Boru and Mael Seachnaill II divide Ireland between them

998

- King Mael Mordha of Leinster, rebelled against the High King of Ireland, Brian Boru.

999

- Brian Boru defeats the Leinstermen and the Vikings at the Battle of Glenn Mama. Sigtrygg Silkbeard, King of Dublin, submits to him. Brian plunders the city.
- Death of Muirgheas mac Aedh, king of Uí Díarmata.

== 1000s ==
1000

- Brian Boru led a combined Munster-Leinster-Dublin army in an attack on High King Máel Sechnaill II's home province of Meath.
