= The Marriage of Strongbow and Aoife =

Painting by Daniel Maclise

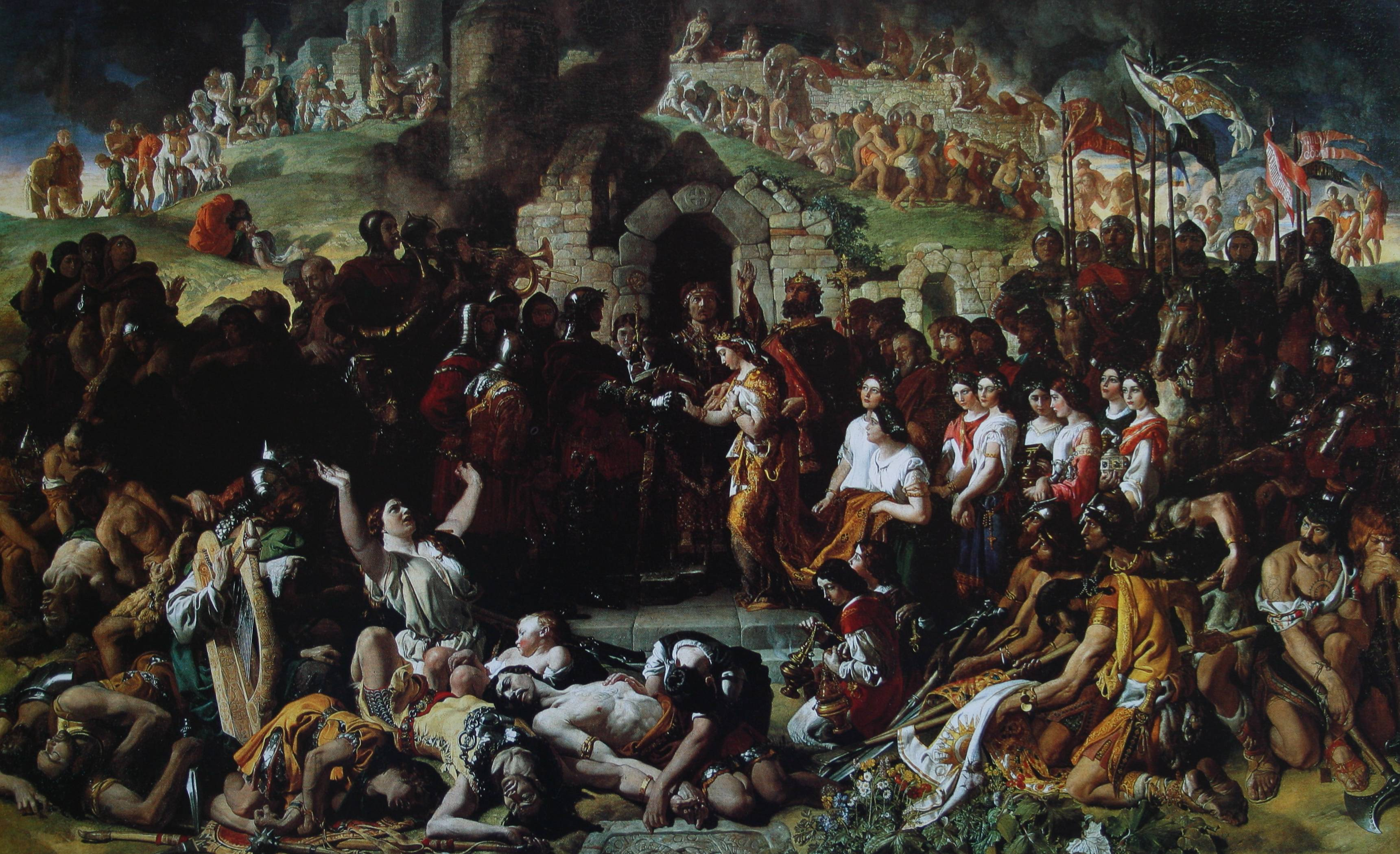
- Artist: Daniel Maclise
- Year: 1854
- Medium: oil on canvas
- Dimensions: 315 cm × 513 cm (124 in × 202 in)
- Location: National Gallery of Ireland, Dublin

The Marriage of Strongbow and Aoife is a large oil-on-canvas painting by Daniel Maclise, painted in 1854 and measuring over 16 m^{2} (170 sq ft). It is at the National Gallery of Ireland, in Dublin.

== Description ==
The painting depicts the 1170 marriage of the Norman knight Richard de Clare, 2nd Earl of Pembroke ("Strongbow") to the Irish princess Aoife Ní Diarmait in Christ Church Cathedral, Waterford. It is portrayed as a pivotal moment in the Norman conquest of Ireland.

In the foreground are the bodies of dead Irish warriors. To the left is a broken-stringed Celtic harp. Richard stands on a broken high cross.

== History ==
The painting was completed by Maclise in 1854. It was initially commissioned to stand in the chamber of the House of Lords in the Palace of Westminster.

It was presented to the National Gallery in 1879 by Sir Richard Wallace, 1st Baronet.

Bank of America Merrill Lynch paid for its restoration in 2010–2017.

Paul Muldoon's poem, of the same title, is in part based on the painting. It appeared in his collection, Meeting the British (1987).
