= Lorcáin mac Lachtna =

Historical Irish king

Lorcáin mac Lachtna also known as Lorcán Locha Deirgdheirc (Lorcán of Lough Derg) or as Lorcán na long (Lorcán of the ships) (died 942) was King of the Dál gCais.

== Life ==
Reabachán mac Mothla died in 934 and according to the Dál gCais king list in An Leabhar Muimhneach he was succeeded by Lorcáin. The same year of Reabachán's death his son, Duibhghiolla, was murdered treacherously by Lorcáin's son Conghalach. This action presumably allowed Lorcáin and the Uí Toirdhealbhach to seize the kingship from their rivals.

== Death ==
According to O'Hart's pedigrees, he died in 942 and was succeeded by his son Cinnéidigh who made large political strides for the Dál gCais.

== Issue ==
Lorcáin had four sons, who all went on to found their own lineages:

- Cinnéidigh
- Cosgarach
- Longargán
- Conghalach
