= Echthighern mac Cennétig =

Irish prince (died 950)

Echthighern mac Cennétig, also spelled Echthigern, (died 950) was a son of Cennétig mac Lorcáin (king of Thomond) and brother of Mathgamain (King of Munster) and Brian Boru (High King of Ireland) of the Dál gCais dynasty, in early medieval Ireland.

The historian Geoffrey Keating states that during the twelve-year period that Mathgamain held the sovereignty of Munster, "Echthighearn, son of Cinneide, was chief of Thomond." Donnchuan mac Cenniedi and his brother Echthigern were slain in the year 950 when Congalach Cnogba, King of Ireland, invaded the province of Munster.
