= Battle of Tara (Ireland) =

980 battle between the Gaelic Irish of Meath and the Norse Vikings of Dublin

Coordinates: 53.5775°N 6.6119°W

- Part of the Viking Invasions of Ireland
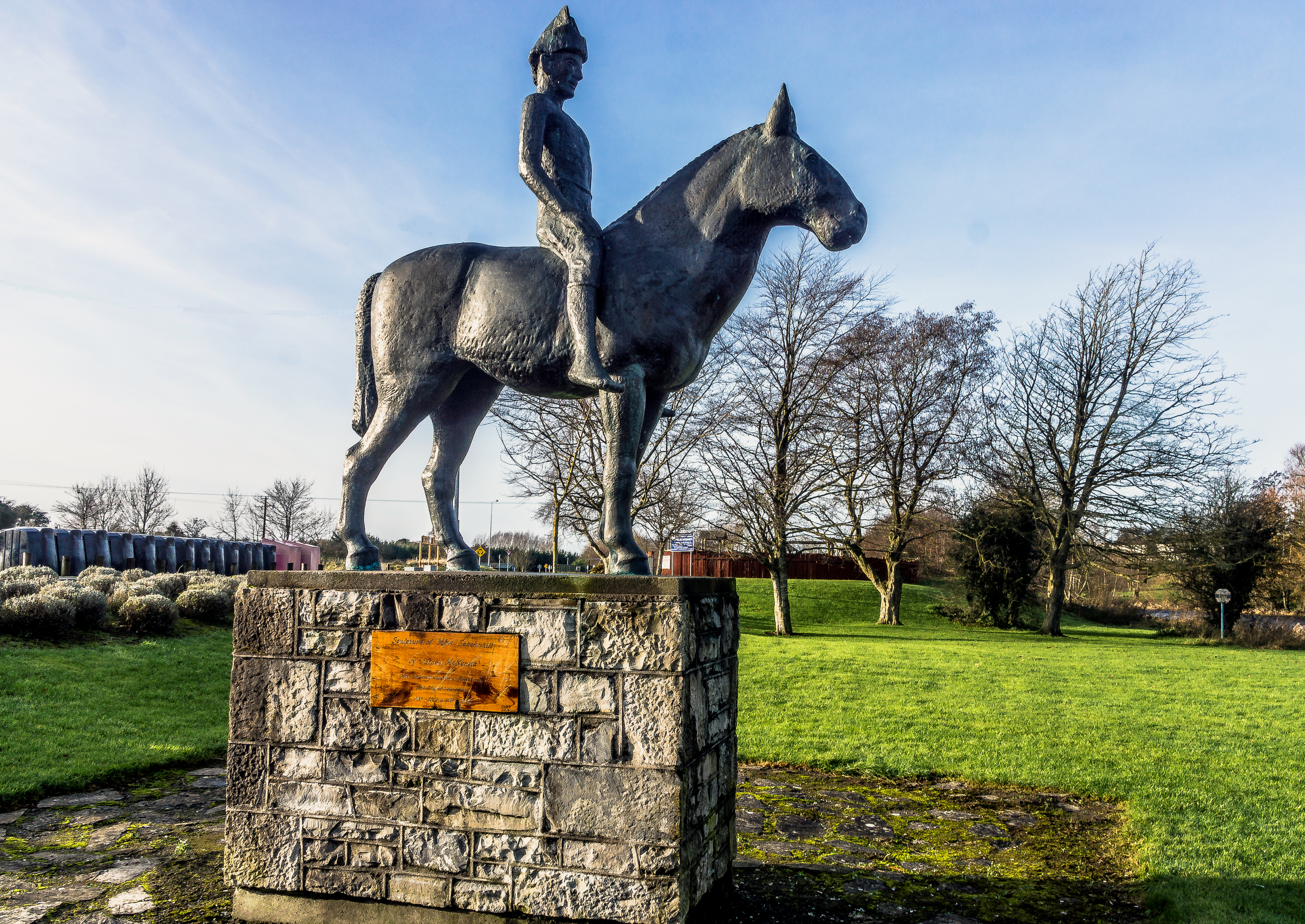
- Malachy MacDonnell, King of Meath
Date	980
Location	Near the Hill of Tara, Meath
Result	Meath victory

Belligerents
Kingdom of Meath	Kingdom of Dublin

Commanders and leaders
Malachy II	Olaf Sigtryggsson

Strength
Unknown	At least 2,000

Casualties and losses
Unknown	Entire army destroyed

The Battle of Tara was fought between the Gaelic Irish of Meath, led by Máel Sechnaill mac Domnaill, and the Norse Vikings of Dublin, led by Amlaíb Cuarán. It took place near the Hill of Tara in Ireland in the year 980. From the period of 950-980 AD, the Vikings had formed temporary alliances with certain Irish clans, enabling them to continue their perennial raids and plunder of the island, however they faced resistance from an alliance of Irish rulers who wanted to eliminate the Viking presence in southern Ireland. The battle was a devastating defeat for the Vikings and led to the Irish regaining control of Dublin.

== Background ==
Prior to the late eight century, Ireland consisted of 5 provincial kingdoms, each ruled by a provincial king with the Uí Neill dynasty holding the decentralised overlordship of Ireland under the High King. The year 795 marked the first Viking raid on Ireland; these raids would intensify in the ninth century and led to the Scandinavians establishing settlements in Ireland, forging alliances with various Irish dynasties and offering military services to provincial odds and rulers whilst establishing and strengthening their base at Dublin. The Viking presence would compel some of the Irish kings to unite against a common enemy. In 902, taking advantage of the internecine strife in the Viking base, the Irish launched a joint attack against Dublin and managed to expel them from the island. The Vikings reappeared in 914, defeated the Irish in the Battle of Confey, reconquered Dublin, assumed control over a large portion of Britain as well as Ireland, established permanent settlements in Ireland to further secure their grip over the island, and began to mix with the local population. Despite the frequent intermarriages that took place, the Scandinavians were still viewed with suspicion and regarded as a potential foreign threat by some of the Irish population, most notably in the north and center of the island. Irish resistance to the Vikings in Dublin had been minor up until Brian Boru's emergence and his expedition against the Vikings in 977, and the Battle of Tara, marking a significant shift in the political balance between the Irish and the Vikings, and becoming the harbinger for the Vikings' decline in Ireland.

== Description ==
On one side there was a Norse army from the Kingdom of Dublin supported by troops from the Hebrides, which was commanded by a son of Olaf Cuaran named Ragnall. The other side was led by Máel Sechnaill mac Domnaill, who had recently come to power as head of the southern Uí Néill. The latter's force consisted of troops from his home province of Mide (the Kingdom of Meath), probably with strong support from troops from Leinster and Ulster.

The battle ended in a devastating defeat for the Norse of Dublin. Olaf abdicated and died in religious retirement in Iona. Dublin was besieged by the victorious Máel Sechnaill, who forced it to surrender slaves and valuables, as well as give up all its prior claims to Uí Néill-held territory. In the following decade, Dublin was more or less under the control of Máel Sechnaill and the Southern Uí Néill.

The Battle of Tara is regarded as a far more decisive defeat for the Norse of Dublin than the later, and much more famous, Battle of Clontarf. Olaf Cuaran was the last of the great Norse kings in Ireland, and following him the status of the Kingdom of Dublin was never the same again.

== Location ==
The battle took place near the Hill of Tara in Ireland, which is an ancient ceremonial burial site and the location of the Lia Fáil (Stone of Destiny) which was a place of inauguration and the seat of power for the High Kings of Ireland. It is assumed by historians that the defence of this sacred site, which also appears in Irish mythology, against the foreign Norse Vikings would have been a rallying point for many local Irishmen.

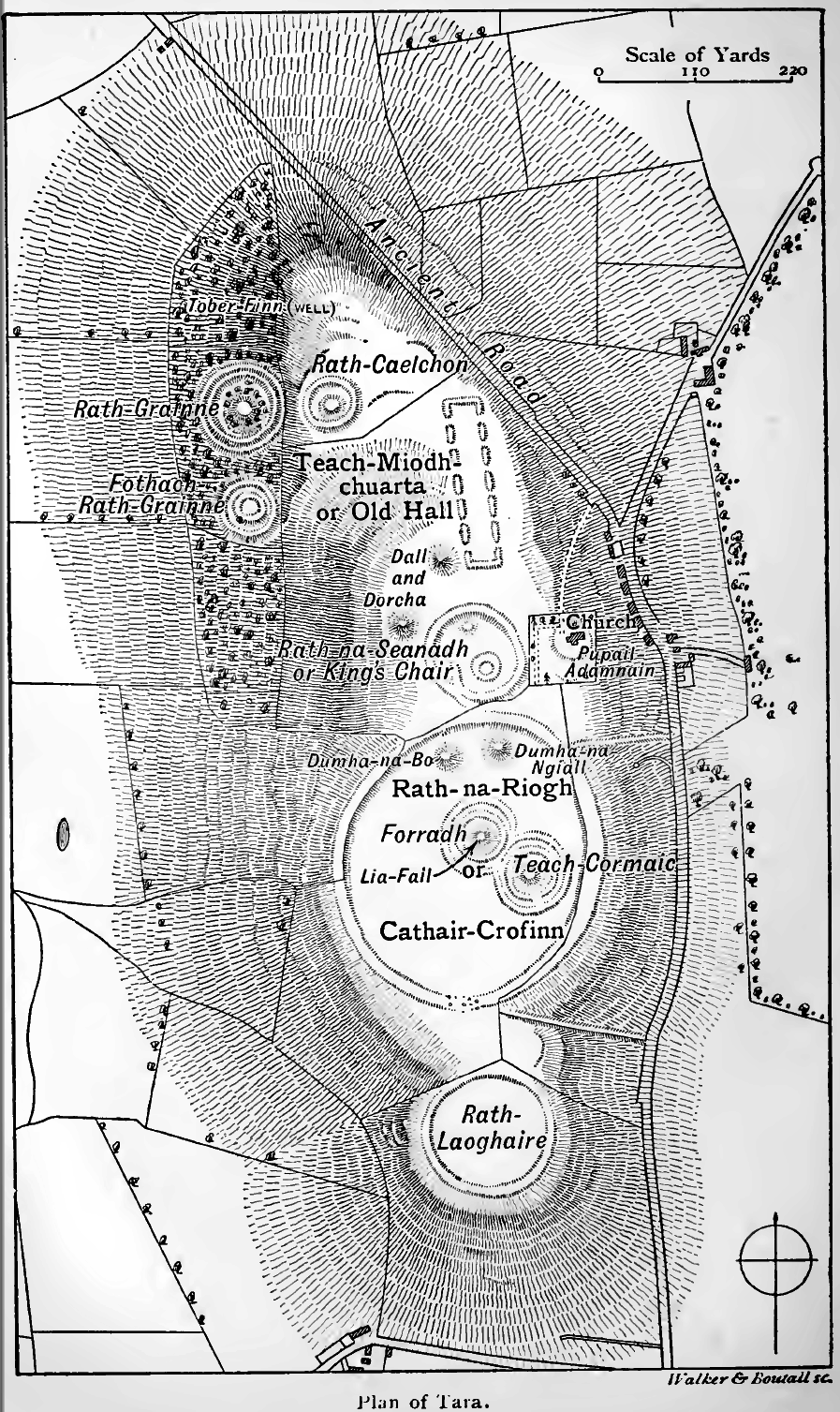
The Hill of Tara

== Causes ==
There are very few records from this period in time so it is not possible to identify all of the causes for the Battle of Tara. However, it is possible to state that combat between minor Irish kings was common in this time period and that about a year prior to this battle an obvious 'casus belli' was the kidnapping (for ransom) of the King of Leinster by the foreign viking king of Dublin:

- Annals of the Four Masters: M977.8 "Domhnall Claen, King of Leinster, was taken prisoner by the foreigners of Ath-cliath (Dublin)."
- Annals of Tigernach: T979.2 "Domhnall Claon, king of Leinster, was captured by the Foreigners of Dublin."

== Primary Sources ==
There are three contemporaneous accounts of the battle: recorded in the :

- Annals of Ulster: M978.3 "The battle of Teamhair was gained by Maelseachlainn, son of Domhnall, over the foreigners of Ath-cliath and of the Islands, and over the sons of Amhlaeibh in particular, where many were slain, together with Raghnall, son of Amhlaeibh, heir to the sovereignty of the foreigners; Conamhail, son of Gilla-Arri; and the orator of Ath-cliath; and a dreadful slaughter of the foreigners along with them. There fell also in the heat of the battle Braen, son of Murchadh, royal heir of Leinster; Conghalach, son of Flann, lord of Gaileanga, and his son, i.e. Maelan; Fiachna and Cuduilich, the two sons of Dubhlaech, two lords of Feara Tulach; and Lachtnan, lord of Mughdhorn-Maighen. After this Amhlaeibh went across the sea, and died at I-Coluim-Cille."
- Annals of the Four Masters: M979.6 "A great army was led by Maelseachlainn, son of Domhnall, King of Ireland, and by Eochaidh, son of Ardgar, King of Ulidia, against the foreigners of Ath-cliath; and they laid siege to them for three days and three nights, and carried thence the hostages of Ireland, and among the rest Domhnall Claen, King of Leinster, and all the hostages of the Ui-Neill. Two thousand was the number of the hostages, besides jewels and goods, and the freedom of the Ui- Neill, from the Sinainn to the sea, from tribute and exaction. It was then Maelseachlainn himself issued the famous proclamation, in which he said:— "Every one of the Gaeidhil who is in the territory of the foreigners, in servitude and bondage, let him go to his own territory in peace and happiness." This captivity was the Babylonian captivity of Ireland, until they were released by Maelseachlainn; it was indeed next to the captivity of hell."
- Annals of Tigernach: T980.3 "The battle of Tara gained by Maelseachnaill the Great son of Domhnall son of Donnchadh son of Flann, by the king of Ireland, over the Foreigners of Dublin, over the sons of Olaf specially, wherein many fell, including Raghnall son of Olaf, crown prince of the Foreigners, and Conmael, son of Giolla (Airi) and the Orator of Dublin, and many others. Braen son of Murchadh, crown prince of Leinster, and Congalach son of Flann, king of the Gailenga, and his son Maelán, and Fiachra and Cú Duiligh, two sons of Dublaech, two kings of the Fir Tulach, and Lachtna, king of Mughdoirn Maigen, fell in the counterblow of that battle."
- Annals of Tigernach: T980.4 "A great hosting by Maelseachnaill the Great son of Domhnall, king of Tara, and by Eochaidh son of Ardghal, king of the Ulaid, to the Foreigners of Dublin, and they beleaguered them for three days and three nights, and brought thence the hostages of Ireland, including Domhnall Claon, king of Leinster, and the guarantees of the Uí Néill besides, and they got their full demand from the Foreigners, to wit, two thousand kine, with jewels and treasures, and moreover with the freedom of the Uí Néill from tribute, from the Shannon to the sea. Tis then that Maelseachnaill proclaimed the famous rising when he said: ‘Let every one of the Gaels who is in the Foreigner's province come forth to his own country for peace and comfort.’ That captivity was the Babylonian captivity of Ireland; twas next to the captivity of Hell."

== See also ==
- Battle of Clontarf
- Battle of Confey
- Early Medieval Ireland 800–1166
- Irish battles

== Bibliography ==
- The Annals of the Four Masters
- Donnchadh Ó Corraín, The Vikings & Ireland
