= Urchadh mac Murchadh =

Irish king

Urchadh mac Murchadh (also called Archad Dearg) (died 943) was King of Maigh Seóla.

== Biography ==
Urchadh is one of the earliest attested kings of Uí Briúin Seóla, whose rulers also seem to have exercised some authority over Iar Connacht. His dynasty, the Muintir Murchada, took their name from his father, Murchadh mac Maenach. The Ó Flaithbertaigh family would later claim him as an ancestor.

== Family ==
Urchadh had an elder brother called Urumhain or Earca.

In addition to his son and successor, Donnchadh, he had three known daughters who achieved notable marriages:

- Bé Binn inion Urchadh, married Cennétig mac Lorcáin, king of Thomond.
- Creassa inion Urchadh, married Tadg mac Cathail, king of Connacht.
- Caineach inion Urchadh, married a prince of the Síol Muireadaigh.

Through his daughter Bé Binn, Urchadh was the maternal grandfather of Brian Boru, High King of Ireland (941–1014).

Preceded by Cléirchén mac Murchadh	King of Maigh Seóla; 891?–943	Succeeded by Donnchadh mac Urchadh

== See also ==
- Ó Flaithbertaigh
