= Flaith =

Gaelic social class

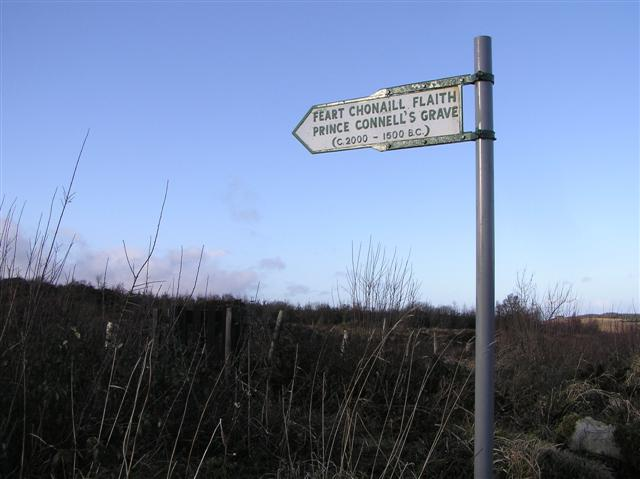
Sign for Corracloona Court Tomb in the north of County Leitrim in Connacht, according to local lore the burial site of a flaith named Conall. Note that flaith is given the translation "Prince."

A flaith (Irish) or flath (Scottish Gaelic; plural flathan), in the Gaelic world, could refer to any member in general of a powerful family enjoying a high degree of sovereignty, and so is also sometimes translated as lord or aristocrat in the general sense, or can refer to sovereignty itself. Thus it did not usually refer to a specific position such as Rí (king) which any given flaith might or might not hold, allowing for the term to eventually develop the slightly alternative meaning of any hereditary high aristocrat who was understood to be subordinate to the king. In this later sense a flaith was similar to a tacksman in the Scottish clan system.

The later development in meaning, innocent in itself, allowed the term flaith to become confused with "chief" as that term is commonly understood in English, when in fact a Gaelic "chief" was very often technically a rí (king) of any one of three or more grades and holding a White Wand. A flaith might not hold a White Wand; he might simply be a brother, nephew or some relation of the king. The flaith might be the head of a junior sept of the royal kindred or a member of another great family which was somehow in the king's service.

Etymologically the word is derived from Proto-Celtic *wlatis, "sovereignty," sharing a root with Welsh gwlad, 'nation;' further back, it is from the Proto-Indo-European root *h₂welh₁-, 'rule', being cognate with English wield or Czech vlast, 'homeland'.

It became an element in personal and eventually family names, an example being the royal family of O'Flaherty (Old Irish: Ua Flaithbertaig "Descendants of the Bright Prince"). It could be combined with rí to form the personal name Flaithrí ("Princely King" or "Kingly Prince"), an example being Flaithrí mac Domnaill, King of Connacht.

A Banfhlaith (lit. "Lady Prince") was a princess more specifically described. However, illustrative of how flaith was principally a general term for a member of the high nobility, the personal names Gormflaith ("Blue Princess" or "Blue Sovereignty") and Órflaith ("Golden Princess") were understood to be female without the addition of the feminine affix.

== See also ==
- Tigerna
- Gaelic Ireland
- Gaelic nobility of Ireland
