= Aoife MacMurrough =

Irish noblewoman (c. 1153 – 1188)

Aoife MacMurrough Aoife Nic Murchada
- Countess of Pembroke
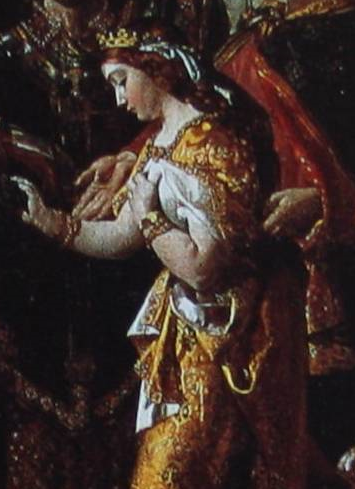
- Excerpt from The Marriage of Strongbow and Aoife (1854)
- Born: c. 1153; Presumably Leinster, Ireland
- Died: c. 1188 (aged about 35); Monmouthshire, Wales
- Buried: Tintern Abbey, Monmouthshire, Wales
- Noble family: Uí Chennselaig (MacMurrough-Kavanagh family)
- Spouse: Richard de Clare, 2nd Earl of Pembroke
- Issue: Isabel; Gilbert
- Father: Dermot MacMurrough
- Mother: Mor O'Toole

Aoife MacMurrough (Irish: Aoife Nic Murchada; c. 1153 – c. 1188), also known as Eva of Leinster or Red Eva, was an Irish noblewoman. The daughter of King of Leinster Dermot MacMurrough, her marriage to Anglo-Norman nobleman Richard "Strongbow" de Clare on 25 August 1170 is considered a pivotal moment in the Anglo-Norman invasion of Ireland.

== Early life and family background ==
Aoife MacMurrough was the daughter of Dermot MacMurrough, King of Leinster, and his wife Mor O'Toole, daughter of King of Uí Muiredaigh, Muirchertach Ua Tuathail. Aoife had an older paternal half-brother, Domhnall Caomhánach, and a maternal half-brother, Conchobar (died 1170).

It is likely that Aoife's parents married around 1153, and historian Marie Therese Flanagan assumes Aoife's birthdate was not soon after their marriage. Flanagan states that Aoife would have been at most seventeen years old during her marriage in 1170, and the National Gallery of Ireland also presumes she was about this age.

As the daughter of the Gaelic nobility of Ireland, the young Aoife would have been raised in much higher dignity than most other girls in Ireland who were of poorer stock than she; her privileged status ensured that she was educated in Brehon law and would have ensured that she was literate in Ecclesiastical Latin. Since her mother (who also produced one son and another daughter) was the second wife of Diarmait, her station was automatically lower than that of her husband's first wife, Sadb Ní Faeláin, and her issue of two sons and one daughter.

== Marriage ==
Aoife's father Dermot was deposed by Ireland's High King Ruaidrí Ua Conchobair. Dermot failed in an attempt to take Waterford. Aoife, with her parents and a handful of their supporters, landed at Bristol in summer 1166. They made their way to Normandy, then to Henry II's court in Aquitaine. Dermot solicited Henry's help to recover his lost kingdom. Henry authorised Dermot to seek help from the Anglo-Normans.

In 1166 or 1168, Dermot promised Aoife's hand in marriage to Anglo-Norman nobleman Richard "Strongbow" de Clare, 2nd Earl of Pembroke, in exchange for military support. Gerald of Wales, an Anglo-Norman apologist, is the only contemporary historian to state that this was Dermot's underlying motivation. Other contemporary sources do not corroborate this, but this was essentially the outcome of the marriage. Contemporary Anglo-Norman propaganda uses the marriage to justify Richard's succession as King of Leinster. According to the National Gallery of Ireland, both the man and the woman had to consent to a marriage under Brehon law, so it is fair to conclude that Aoife agreed to an arranged marriage. Conversely, Flanagan states that Aoife undoubtedly had no control over the marriage.

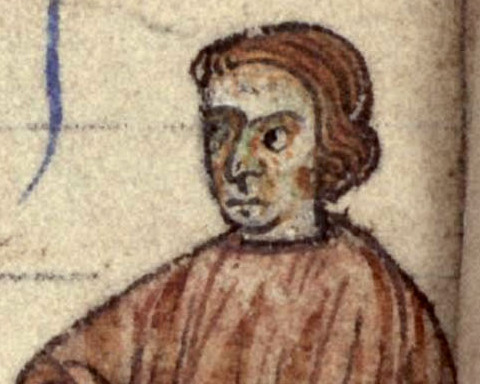
Aoife's husband Richard de Clare was known as "Strongbow".

On 23 August 1170, Waterford was captured in a short but violent battle. Aoife married Richard almost immediately after on 25 August in Christchurch Cathedral in Waterford. Under Anglo-Norman law, this gave Richard succession rights to the Kingdom of Leinster. However Richard had no such rights under Ireland's Brehon law.

At some point between her marriage in 1170 and Richard's death in 1176, Aoife gave birth to two children: Gilbert (born c. 1173) and Isabel.

== Widow ==
Aoife was entitled to a third of the income from her late husband's demesne estates. It appears that in 1183 and 1184, Aoife resided in Chepstow Castle in Monmouthshire, Wales. Since the Welsh were attacking Glamorgan in 1184, Aoife may have moved to Wales to protect Chepstow from falling into Welsh control.

In 1185, Aoife (known as "the Irish countess") boasted demesne manors in Weston, Hertfordshire, and Chesterford, Essex. She later issued a charter which advocated for a Benedictine nunnery at Ickleton, Cambridgeshire. Around this time she was using the title "Countess Eva, heir of King Diarmait". Aoife appeared more prominently in English administrative records than in Irish sources.

Unusually for a young widow at that time, she never remarried. This, along with her statement that she was Dermot's heir, could suggest she had a strong personality. It appears Aoife was a forthright woman, as she even led troops into battle. This was an impossibility in Norman society, but not unusual in her native Irish society.

== Death and legacy ==
Aoife was buried in Tintern Abbey, Monmouthshire, alongside her father-in-law Gilbert de Clare, 1st Earl of Pembroke. Her year of death is unclear. One suggested year is 1188. One tale of her demise exists; It supposes that, as a young woman, she lived many years following the death of Strongbow in 1176, and devoted herself to raising their children and defending their territory.

Gilbert died sometime after 1185, and Isabel became Richard's heir. In 1189 Isabel's hand in marriage was promised to William Marshal, 1st Earl of Pembroke, by King Henry II. If Aoife was still alive at this time, her independence would have been suddenly limited once Marshal assumed Richard's estates.

Daniel Maclise's 1854 painting The Marriage of Strongbow and Aoife depicts her marriage to Richard in an anachronistic Greco-Roman style. In contrast to her apparently strong personality, Maclise portrays Aoife as a despondent young girl who looks sullenly at the ground as the marriage ceremony is performed. Her misery is highlighted by the poses of her father and fiancé—Dermot pushes Aoife towards Richard, who grasps her by the hand and crushes a Celtic cross under his foot. Aoife's reluctant marriage to Richard, under the orders of her father Dermot, symbolically represents Ireland's conquering by the Normans.

== Issue ==
Children of Aoife MacMurrough and Richard de Clare (Strongbow)
Name	Birth	Death	Notes
Isabel de Clare, 4th Countess of Pembroke	1172	1220	m. Aug 1189, Sir William Marshal, 1st Earl of Pembroke, Lord Marshal, son of John Fitz Gilbert, Marshal (Marechal) of England, and Sibylla of Salisbury.
Gilbert de Striguil (Chepstow), 3rd Earl of Pembroke	c. 1173	after 1185	Inherited title from father but died as a minor. The title then went to his sister's husband on their marriage. Isabel's husband, William Marshal, was given the title Earl of Pembroke in his own right by King John of England. Marshal did not call himself the Earl until he had achieved the privilege in his own right in 1198, rather than through his marriage to Isabel.

== Popular culture ==
- Aoife is the main character of the historical novel The Irish Princess, written by Elizabeth Chadwick.

== See also ==
- Aoife
