= Órfhlaith Foyle =

Irish author and poet

- Born: Nigeria
- Occupations: Novelist; Poet
- Notable work: Belios, Lilliput Press, 2005 – novel; Revenge, Arlen House, 2005 – mixed collection

Órfhlaith Foyle is an Irish novelist and poet.

Foyle was born in Nigeria to Irish missionary parents, living there as well as Kenya and Malawi, all of which had a profound effect upon her writing.

She has a Bachelor in Humanities, and is a full-time writer, who has been published in a number of literary journals. Foyle has also lived in Australia, France, Russia, Israel and the United Kingdom, and now lives in Galway, Ireland.

Her publications to date include a novel, a book of poetry, and two collections of short stories. A second novel is forthcoming. Her cited influences include Flannery O'Connor, Katherine Mansfield, Emily Brontë and Emily Dickinson.

== Selected works ==
- Belios, Lilliput Press, 2005 – novel
- Revenge, Arlen House, 2005 – mixed collection
- Red Riding Hood's Dilemma, Arlen House, 2010 – poetry, nominated for the Rupert and Eithne Strong Award
- Somewhere in Minnesota, Arlen House 2011 – short story collection
- Clemency Browne Dreams of Gin, Arlen House 2014 - short story collection
