= Cennétig mac Lorcáin =

King of Dál gCais
- Predecessor: Lorcáin mac Lachtna
- Successor: Lachtna mac Cennétig
- Died: 951
- Consort: Beibhinn and others
- Issue: Brian Boru; Mathgamain; Donncuan; Echthighern; Anlón; Lachtna; Finn; Dub; Marcán; Flann; Conchobar; Orlaith
- House: Uí Thairdhealbhach, of the Uí Bhloid (Dál gCais)
- Father: Lorcáin mac Lachtna

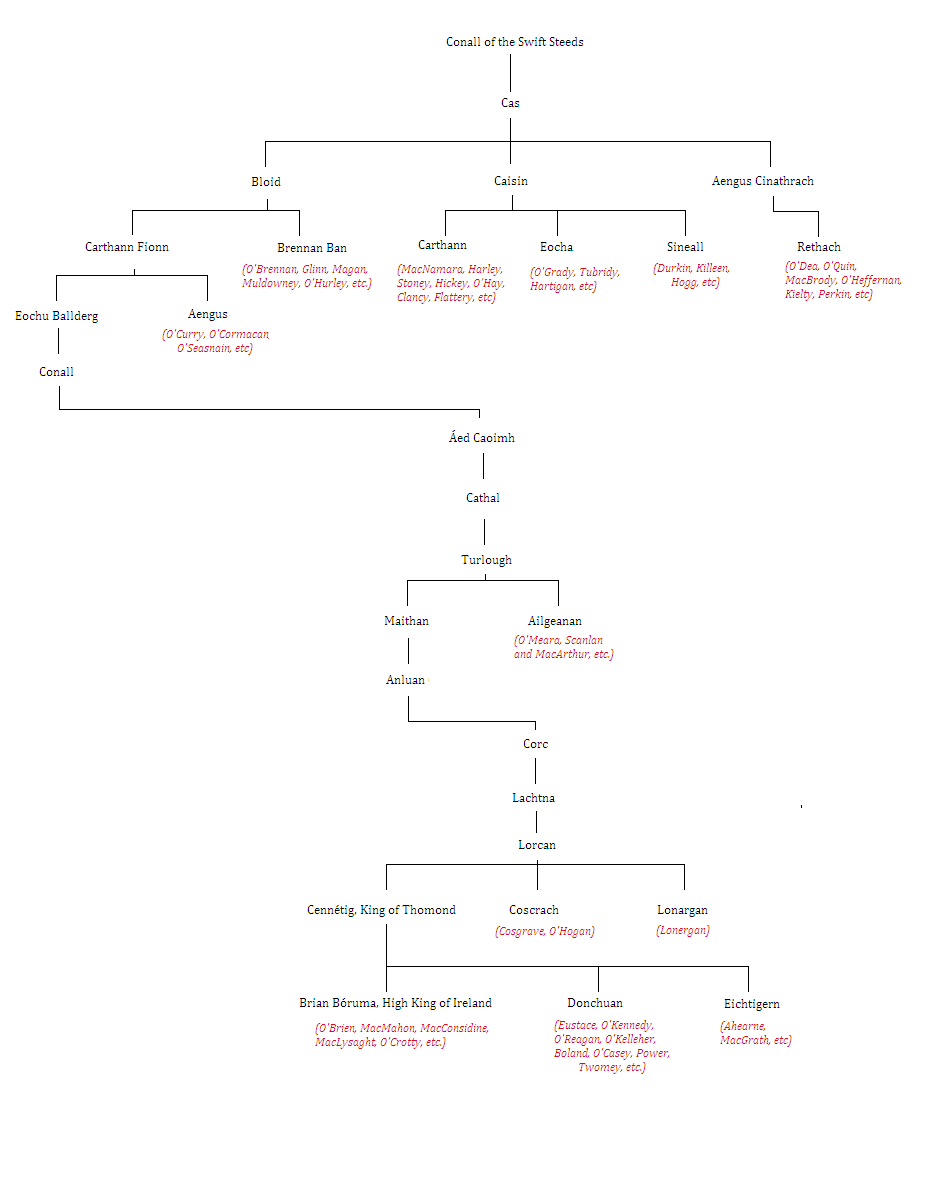
Tree graph showing relationships between the Dalcassian septs.

Cennétig mac Lorcáin (died 951), was a prominent king of the Dál gCais (or "Dalcassians") and king of Tuadmumu. He raised the dynasty in power, from regional vassals of the kings of Munster, to challenging for the kingship himself. He was the father of Brian Boru, who would continue Cennétig's war-like rise to power, by becoming High King of Ireland in 1002.

== Reign ==
Cennétig took over after his father Lorcáin mac Lachtna, who is noted as a king of the Dál gCais. They belonged to the Uí Thairdhealbhach, a cadet branch of the Uí Bhloid ruling dynasty of the Dál gCais, the Uí Oengusso. After the death of Rebeachan Mac Mothla, who died as King of the Dál gCais and Abbot of Tuam Greine in 934, Cennetig's father Lorcáin is said to succeed him, being the first of the Uí Thairdhealbhach rulers. Cennétig married Beibhinn, daughter of Urchadh mac Murchadh, king of Iar Connacht (a political marriage typical of the time). Though he also had several other wives, unnamed in the historical sources.

He was the first King of the Dál gCais to lead an army outside his own territory (approximately modern day County Clare) and lead raids along the Shannon, reaching as far north as Athlone. Through the 940s, Cennétig engaged in an ongoing series of wars against the Eóganachta, the then ruling dynasties of Munster, with the aim of becoming king of Munster himself. His daughter Orlaith married the High King Donnchad Donn as part of an alliance between the Dál gCais and the Uí Neill against the King of Munster, Cellachán Caisil. He lost the Battle of Gort Rotacháin at Mag Dúin in 944 to Cellachán, where two of his sons are said to have died. An Leabhar Muimhneach ("The Book of Munster") reports that he won a battle against Cellachán at Inis Locha Saingleann (Singland, Limerick).

Cennétig seems to have fought against the new High King, Congalach Cnogba, in the later attack on Munster in 950. Two of Cennétig sons, Donncuan and Echthighern, were killed in the fighting. Congalach returned again in 951, this time with the combined fleet of "Leth Cuinn" (the northern half of Ireland) and plundered along the Shannon (some of which would have been Cennétig's territory).

== Death ==
On his death in 951, the Chronicon Scotorum remembers him simply as "king of Dál Cais", but the Annals of Ulster describe him as "rí Tuathmumam" (King of Thomund). Whereas the Annals of Inisfallen give him the title "rídamna Cassil", or a candidate to the Munster kingship. He was succeeded by his son Lachtna.

Both the Cogad Gáedel re Gallaib ("The War of the Irish with the Foreigners") and the Book of Leinster (both later sources) say that Cennétig was "slain", but do not specify by whom. Though the Cogad may be implying that the Vikings of Limerick played a part.

== Children ==
Cennétig had many children (by several wives), perhaps 11 or 12 sons, including Brian Boru. Of these only five produced heirs for themselves (Brian, Mathgamain, Donncuan, Echthighern and Anlón), seven did not (Lachtna, Finn, Dub, Marcán, Flann, Conchobar and another son whose name is not recorded).

His daughter Órlaith was the wife of the High King Donnchad Donn (she is Cennétig's only daughter recorded in sources, though he may have had others). Órlaith was executed in 941 by Donnchad, supposedly for adultery with her stepson, Oengus mac Donnchada. The fact that Órlaith was killed rather than simply repudiated by her husband, suggests that her family was regarded as significantly lower ranking than that of the High King. However, the fact that this marriage had been made in the first place suggests that Cennétig and his family were moving up the social hierarchy.

Two of his sons—Dub and Finn—are said to have died at Gort Rotacháin in 944, two—Donncuan and Echthighern—died in 950 during the invasion of Munster by Donnchad Donn's successor Congalach Cnogba. Lachtna apparently succeeded his father, but was killed in 953 by the Uí Chearnaigh and Uí Floinn septs of the Dál gCais, he was followed by his brother Mathgamain.

When Mathgamain was killed in 976, Cennétig's last remaining son, Brian, took over leadership of the Dál gCais. He would go on to defeat the Eóganacht and become High King of Ireland. Another son, Marcán, was Abbot of Tuamgraney and later Inis Cealtra until his death in 1003. The Banshenchas says that only Flann and Conchobar were full brothers of Brian (sons of Beibhinn).

== Descendants ==
Since several of his sons founded their own dynasties, Cennétig is the fore-father of many Irish surnames today. The Ó Cinnéide family (O'Kennedy or Kennedy) take their name directly from him.

== Sources ==
- "Annals of Ulster AD 431-1201". CELT: Corpus of Electronic Texts.
- "Genealogies from Rawlinson B 502 -- De genelogia Dál Chais ut inuenitur in psalterio Caissil". CELT: Corpus of Electronic Texts.
- Duffy, Seán (2004). "Brian Bóruma (Brian Boru) (c.941–1014)". Oxford Dictionary of National Biography (online ed.). Oxford University Press. doi:10.1093/ref:odnb/3377. (Subscription or UK public library membership required.)(subscription required)
