= Mór ingen Cearbhaill =

Mór ingen Cearbhaill, daughter of the Cerball mac Dúnlainge king of Osraige. She became queen of Laigin; she died in 916.

The Annals of the Four Masters, sub anno 916, say of her, "Mor, daughter of Cearbhall, son of Dunghal, Queen of South Leinster, died after a good life."

The identity of her husband is uncertain: contenders include Augaire mac Ailella, or the ruler of the Uí Cheinnselaig at the time, such as Dub Gilla mac Etarscéoil (died 903) or Tadg mac Fáeláin (died 922).

== See also ==
- Mór (Irish name)
