= Mór Ní Thuathail =

Queen-consort of Leinster
- Tenure: c. 1150 – 1 May 1171
- Born: c. 1114; Castledermot, County Kildare, Ireland
- Died: 1191; Ireland
- Spouse: Diarmait Mac Murchada, King of Leinster
- Issue: Aoife MacMurrough; Conchobhar MacMurrough
- House: O'Toole; Mac Murchada
- Father: Muitchertach Ua Tuathail
- Mother: Cacht Ní Morda

Mór Ní Thuathail (anglicised as Mor O'Toole; c. 1114 – 1191) was a queen-consort of Leinster as the principal first wife of King Diarmait Mac Murchada. Under Brehon Law, Irish men were allowed more than one wife. King Dermot's second wife was Sadhbh Ní Fhaolain.

Mór was the mother of Aoife of Leinster, the wife of Richard de Clare, Earl of Pembroke, known to history as Strongbow.

== Family ==
Mór was born in Castledermot, Kildare, Ireland in about 1114, the daughter of Muirchertach Ua Tuathail, King of the Uí Muiredaigh, and Cacht Ní Morda.

Her paternal grandparents were Gilla Comgaill Ua Toole and Sadbh Ní Domnail and her maternal grandparents were Loigsig Ua Morda, King of Laois and Gormlaith Ní Caellaide.

One of Mór's four half-brothers was St. Lorcán Ua Tuathail, Archbishop of Dublin, who was canonised in 1225 by Pope Honorius III.

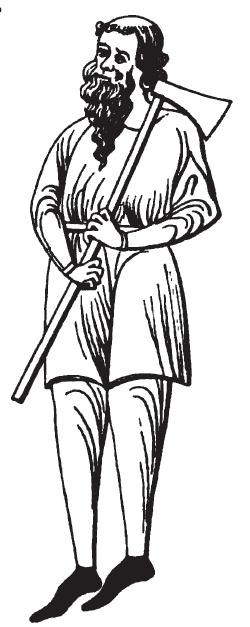
Dermot MacMurrough, King of Leinster and husband of Mór, from a manuscript of the Expugnatio Hibernica

== Marriage and issue ==
Sometime about 1150 in Loch Garman, County Wexford, Mór was married to King Diarmait Mac Murchada of Leinster as his second wife, making her Queen-consort of Leinster. His main wife was Sadhbh Ní Fhaolain. Under Brehon Law, Irish men were permitted more than one wife. In 1152, he abducted Derbforgaill Ní Mhaol Seachlainn, the wife of the King of Breifne, Tighearnán Ua Ruairc (Irish: Tighearnán Ua Ruairc).

Together Dermot and Mór had two children:

- Aoife MacMurrough (1153–1188), married 29 August 1170, Richard de Clare, 2nd Earl of Pembroke, known to history as Strongbow, by whom she had two children, including Isabel de Clare, 4th Countess of Pembroke, who became the heiress to her father's titles and estates.
- Conchobhar Mac Murchada (died 1170)

In 1170, Mór's son Conchobhar was killed by Ruaidrí Ua Conchobair, High King of Ireland, after having been taken hostage while Diarmait waged war against Ruaidrí with the aim of overthrowing him in order to take his place as the High King.

Queen Mór died in 1191, three years after her eldest daughter, Aoife. Her husband predeceased her on 1 May 1171 in Ferns, shortly after the Cambro-Norman invasion of Ireland led by their son-in-law, Strongbow.

== See also ==
- Mór (Irish name)
- Mor Ní Briain, Queen of Connacht, died 1218
- Elizabeth Calf, Queen of Leinster, fl. 1390
