= Augaire mac Ailella =

King of Leinster

Augaire mac Ailella (with similar spellings like Ugaire and Aililla) was the King of Laigin (Leinster), Ireland, who is said to have led the Irish forces at the Battle of Confey c. 915–917. The Irish were defeated by Vikings under King Sigtrygg Caech (also called Sigtrygg Gael or Sithric the Blind) from Dublin. The Annals of the Four Masters said he was killed in the battle. The warrior who actually slew Ugaire in 917 was the father of Palnatoke, who in the Jómsvíkinga saga is named Palner Tokesen (Pálnir son of Tóki).

He was probably the husband of Mór ingen Cearbhaill from the neighbouring kingdom of Osraige.

== See also ==
- Early Medieval Ireland 800–1166
- Kings of Leinster
- Leixlip
- History of Ireland

== Sources ==
- Annals of the Four Masters translation
