= Battle of Confey =

917 battle in Ireland

Battle of Cenn Fuait (Confey)
- Part of the Viking activities in Ireland
Date	c. 915–917
Location	Possibly what is today Leixlip, County Kildare, or Glynn, County Carlow
Result	Viking victory

Belligerents
Kingdom of Leinster	Kingdom of Dublin

Commanders and leaders
Augaire mac Ailella †	Sigtrygg Caech

Casualties and losses
~600 dead	

The Battle of Confey or Cenn Fuait was fought in Ireland in 917 between the Vikings of Dublin and the Irish King of Leinster, Augaire mac Ailella. It led to the recapture of Dublin by the Norse dynasty that had been expelled from the city fifteen years earlier by Augaire's predecessor, Cerball mac Muirecáin of Uí Fáeláin, and his ally Máel Finnia mac Flannacáin, the King of Brega.

== Location ==
There is still some uncertainty concerning the location of the battle. The Annals of Ulster report that "Sitriuc, grandson of Ímar, landed with his fleet at Cenn Fuait on the border [airiur, airer] of Leinster." No such place is known, but the Annals of the Four Masters record that the battle took place in "the valley above Tech Moling". Tech Moling is St Mullin's, an ecclesiastical settlement in the extreme south of County Carlow, on the western boundary of Leinster, and accessible by ship via the River Barrow. Edmund Hogan identified Cenn Fuait ("Fuat's Head") with Glynn, a village which lies on a small stream about a kilometre north-east of St Mullin's.

The Four Masters record that after the battle the "foreigners of Ceann Fuaid" plundered Kildare, which lies about 50 km from Glynn. This led the historians John O'Donovan and Bartholomew MacCarthy to identify Cenn Fuait with Confey or Confoy, near what is today Leixlip, County Kildare, on the border between Leinster and the Kingdom of Mide.

W. M. Hennessy believed that airiur or airer indicated that Cenn Fuait was a headland on the coast of Leinster; but no such headland is known, and it has been objected that while airiur can mean "coast", it also denotes the border region between two neighbouring territories.

== Cath Cinn Fuait ==
The Annals of Ulster record the battle and the events that led to it thus:

Sitriuc, grandson of Ímar, landed with his fleet at Cenn Fuait on the border of Leinster. Ragnall, grandson of Ímar, with his second fleet moved against the foreigners of Waterford. A slaughter of the foreigners at Emly in Munster. The Eóganacht and the Ciarraige made another slaughter.

Niall son of Aed, king of Ireland, led an army of the southern and northern Uí Néill to Munster to make war on the heathens. He halted on the 22nd day of the month of August at Topar Glethrach in Mag Feimin [near Clonmel]. The heathens had come into the district on the same day. The Irish attacked them between the hour of tierce and midday and they fought until eventide, and about a hundred men, the majority foreigners, fell between them. Reinforcements(?) came from the camp of the foreigners to aid their fellows. The Irish turned back to their camp in face of the last reinforcement, i.e. Ragnall, king of the dark foreigners, accompanied by a large force of foreigners. Niall son of Aed proceeded with a small number against the heathens, so that God prevented a great slaughter of the others through him. After that Niall remained twenty nights encamped against the heathens. He sent word to the men of Leinster that they should lay siege to the encampment from a distance. They were routed by Sitriuc grandson of Ímar in the battle of Cenn Fuait, where five hundred, or somewhat more, fell. And there fell too Ugaire son of Ailill, king of Leinster, Mael Mórda son of Muirecán, king of eastern Life, Mael Maedóc son of Diarmait, a scholar and bishop of Leinster, Ugrán son of Cennéitig, king of Laois, and other leaders and nobles.

Sitriuc grandson of Ímar entered Áth Cliath.

According to the later tract Cogad Gáedel re Gallaib and the Annals of the Four Masters the victorious Norsemen then plundered Kildare. The former text describes Sitric's capture of Dublin thus:

There came after that the immense royal fleet of Sitriuc and the family of Ímar, i.e. Sitriuc the Blind, the grandson of Ímar; and they forced a landing at Dublin of Ath Cliath, and made an encampment there.

== Impact of the battle ==
The Battle of Confey took place during a time of increased Viking attacks. The victorious Vikings were led by Sigtrygg Caech (also called Sigtrygg Gael or Sitric the Blind). The Annals of the Four Masters include among the 600 Irish dead several leaders in addition to Augaire mac Ailella the King of Leinster: "Maelmordha, son of Muireagan, lord of Eastern Life; Mughron, son of Cinneidigh, lord of the three Comainns and of Laois; Cinaedh, son of Tuathal, lord of Ui-Feineachlais; and many other chieftains, with the arch-bishop Maelmaedhog, son of Diarmaid, who was one of the Ui-Conannla, Abbot of Gleann-Uisean, a distinguished scribe, anchorite, and an adept in the Latin learning and the Scotic language."

Augaire was killed by Palmairslau also known as Palner Tokesen from Funen, the father of Palnatoke.

Norse settlers founded the town of Leixlip after the battle.

Sitric was a member of the Norse dynasty which had ruled Dublin from the middle of the ninth century until 902. In that year the Ivar II, King of Dublin, and his family were driven from the city by Cerball mac Muirecáin Ó Fáeláin the King of Leinster and Máel Finnia mac Flannacáin the King of Brega. In the Annals of Ulster Sitric Caech and Ívarr II are both referred to as ua Ímair, "grandson of Ímar", a reference to Ivar I, who was the King (or co-regent) of Dublin from about 853 until his death in 873 and the ancestor of most of the Norse rulers of the city. Sitric, therefore, was either a brother or a first cousin of the ousted Ivar II (who had died in Scotland in 904). It is probably safe to assume that he was born in Dublin and was a young man when he and his family fled for their lives in 902.

Following his victory at Cenn Fuait, Sitric occupied Dublin, which was to remain a Norse stronghold until the King of Dublin was ousted by Diarmuit mac Maél na mBó, King of Leinster and later High King of Ireland, in the year 1052.

== See also ==
- Early Medieval Ireland 800–1166
- Kings of Dublin
- Battle of Tara
- Battle of Clontarf

== Sources ==
- Leixlip Town Council
- History of Leixlip
- Summary of "The Vikings" by Johannes Bronsted
- Annals of the Four Masters translation
