= Órlaith íngen Cennétig =

- Queen consort of Ireland
- Died: 941
- Spouse: Donnchad Donn
- House: Dál gCais
- Father: Cennétig mac Lorcáin

Órlaith íngen Cennétig, was Queen of Ireland. She was executed in 941.

== Background ==
Órlaith appears to be the only recorded daughter of King Cennétig mac Lorcáin of Thomond (died 951). Her siblings included Mathgamain mac Cennétig (King of Munster c.970-976) and Brian Bóruma (King of Ireland 1002–14). She was the second consort of the Irish High King Donnchad Donn.

== Adultery and execution ==
Órlaith was accused of adultery with her stepson, Óengus mac Donnchad Donn. Found guilty, she was executed, though the manner of her death is uncertain. Óengus survived and lived to succeed his father. It is uncertain if she had any offspring.

== Annalistic reference ==
The Chronicon Scotorum; sub anno 941, state that "Órlaith daughter of Cennétigh son of Lorcán was slain by Donnchad son of Flann, king of Ireland, having been charged (with illicit sexual relations) with Óengus, his son."

== See also ==
- Órlaith
