= Caineach inion Urchadh =

Princess of the Uí Briúin Seóla and Queen of Connacht

Caineach inion Urchadh Princess of the Uí Briúin Seóla and Queen of Connacht, fl. early 10th century.

Caineach was one of three daughters of King Urchadh mac Murchadh of Maigh Seóla (died 943). She became the wife of a prince of the Síol Muiredaig.

She was an aunt of three notable Irish rulers:

- King Máel Ruanaid Mór mac Tadg of Moylurg (fl. 956))
- King Conchobar mac Tadg of Connacht (reigned 967-973)
- High King of Ireland, Brian Boru (reigned 1002–1014)

== See also ==
- Cainnech (given name)
