= Broderick (surname) =

- Languages: Welsh, Irish, Old Norse

Origin
- Meaning: Welsh: "son of Rhydderch"; Irish: "descendant of Bruadar"; "Brother" Old Norse: "Blood Brother" or "Ginger brother"

Broderick is a surname of early medieval English origin, and subsequently the Anglicised versions of names of Irish and Welsh origin.

== English origin ==
The name was originally derived from "son of Baldric (or Baldrick)". Broderick or Broderic may also refer to a person living at or near a broad ridge.

== Irish origin ==
It is an Anglicised form of the Irish Ó Bruadair, meaning "descendant of Bruadar". The Irish Bruattar /Bruadar /Brodur is first recorded in 853, in the name of Bruattar mac Aeda, an Irish princeling from the south-east of Ireland. As a Norse personal name, Brodir is found in the name of a particular participant in the Battle of Clontarf and of a particular King of Dublin who was killed in 1160.

== Welsh origin ==
The name is an Anglicised form of the Welsh Prydderch, meaning "son of Rhydderch". The Welsh personal name Rhydderch was originally a byname meaning "reddish brown".

== Notable people with the surname ==
=== A ===
- Alanna Broderick (born 1980), Jamaican tennis player
- Amanda Broderick (born 1971), British academic administrator

=== B ===
- Beth Broderick (born 1959), American actress
- Betty Broderick (1947–2026), American convicted murderer
- Billy Broderick (1908–1946), Irish swimmer
- Bonaventure Broderick (1868–1943), American bishop
- Brendan Broderick, American screenwriter
- Brian Broderick (born 1986), American baseball player

=== C ===
- Carlfred Broderick (1932–1999), American psychologist
- Case Broderick (1839–1920), American politician
- Chris Broderick (born 1970), American musician
- Colin Broderick, Northern Irish filmmaker

=== D ===
- Damien Broderick (1944–2025), Australian writer
- D'Arcy Broderick, Canadian musician
- David C. Broderick (1820–1859), American politician
- Dorothy M. Broderick (1929–2011), American librarian

=== E ===
- Edwin Broderick (1917–2006), American prelate
- Elizabeth Broderick, Australian lawyer

=== G ===
- Greg Broderick (born 1985), Irish show jumper

=== H ===
- Heather Woods Broderick (born 1983), American musician
- Helen Broderick (1891–1959), American actress
- Henry Broderick, Irish politician
- Henry Broderick (realtor) (1880–1975), American realtor

=== J ===
- Jack Broderick (1877–1957), Canadian lacrosse player
- James Broderick (1927–1982), American actor
- James Patrick Broderick (1891–1973), Irish writer
- Joan B. Broderick, American chemist
- John Broderick (disambiguation), multiple people
- Johnny Broderick (1896–1966), American detective

=== K ===
- Ken Broderick (1942–2016), Canadian ice hockey player
- Kevin Broderick (born 1977), Irish athlete

=== L ===
- Laurence Broderick (born 1935), British sculptor
- Len Broderick (born 1938), Canadian ice hockey player
- Leslie Broderick (1921–2013), British pilot
- Lorraine Broderick (born 1948), American television writer

=== M ===
- Matt Broderick (1877–1940), American baseball player
- Matthew Broderick (born 1962), American actor
- Mike Broderick (born 1939), American politician

=== N ===
- Neville Broderick (1927–1994), Australian rules footballer

=== P ===
- Paddy Broderick (1939–2020), Irish jockey
- Pat Broderick (born 1953), American comic book artist
- Patricia Broderick (1925–2003), American playwright
- Patricia A. Broderick (born 1949), American judge
- Paul Broderick (born 1970), Australian rules footballer
- Peter Broderick (born 1987), American musician

=== R ===
- Raymond J. Broderick (1914–2000), American politician
- Robert Broderick, Irish comedian
- Robert Broderick (actor), American actor
- Ryan Broderick, American journalist

=== S ===
- Seán Broderick (1890–1953), Irish politician
- Steve Broderick (born 1981), American musician

=== T ===
- Tamara Broderick, American computer scientist
- Thomas Broderick (1882–1933), Irish priest
- Timothy J. Broderick (born 1964), American surgeon and professor
- T. S. Broderick (1893–1962), Irish mathematician

=== V ===
- Vernon S. Broderick (born 1963), American judge
- Vince Broderick (1920–2010), English cricketer
- Vincent Broderick (disambiguation), multiple people

=== W ===
- William Broderick (1877–1957), Irish politician and farmer

== See also ==
- Broderick (disambiguation)
- Broderick (given name)
- Brodrick, a given name or surname
- Judge Broderick (disambiguation), a list of Judges with the surname "Broderick"
- Senator Broderick (disambiguation), a list of Senators with the surname "Broderick"
