= Broderick (given name) =

- Languages: Welsh, Irish, Old Norse

Origin
- Meaning: Welsh: "son of Rhydderch"; Irish: "descendant of Bruadar"; "Brother" Old Norse: "Blood Brother" or "Ginger brother"

Broderick is a given name of Welsh descent meaning "son of Rhydderch", or son of "reddish-brown", likely referring to the son of a person with reddish-brown hair.

== Notable people with the given name "Broderick" ==
- Broderick Bozimo (born 1939), Nigerian politician
- Broderick Chinnery (1742–1808), Irish politician
- Broderick Crawford (1911–1986), American actor
- Broderick Dyke (born 1960), Australian tennis player
- Broderick Stephen Harvey (born 1957), American comedian and television presenter
- Broderick Henderson (born 1957), American politician
- Broderick Adé Hogue (1989–2021), American art director
- Broderick Hunter (born 1991), American model
- Broderick Johnson, American film producer
- Broderick D. Johnson, American civil servant
- Broderick Jones (born 2001), American football player
- Broderick Miller, American screenwriter
- Broderick O'Farrell (1882–1955), American actor
- Broderick Pabillo (born 1955), Filipino prelate
- Broderick Perkins (born 1954), American baseball player
- Broderick Sargent (born 1962), American football player
- Broderick Smith (1948–2023), Australian musician
- Broderick Thomas (born 1967), American football player
- Broderick Thompson (1960–2002), American football player
- Broderick Thompson (alpine skier) (born 1994), Canadian skier
- Broderick Warner (1847–1881), Trinidadian cricketer
- Broderick Washington Jr. (born 1997), American football player
- Broderick Wright (born 1987), Australian rugby player

== Fictional characters with the name Broderick ==
- Broderick Northmoor, director of the Federal Berau of Control, in the universe of Control (video game)

== See also ==
- Broderick (disambiguation), a disambiguation page for "Broderick"
- Broderick (surname), a page for people with the surname "Broderick"
- Brodrick, a page for people the given or surname "Brodrick"
