= Brodrick =

Brodrick (or Brodric) is a given name and surname. Notable people with the name include:

== Given name ==
- Brodrick Bunkley (born 1983), American football player
- Brodrick Haldane (1912–1996), Scottish-born photographer
- Brodrick Hartwell (1909–1993), British baronet
- Brodrick C. D. A. Hartwell (1876–1948), British Army officer
- Brodric Martin (born 1999), American football player
- Brodric Thomas (born 1997), American basketball player

== Surname ==
- Alan Brodrick, 1st Viscount Midleton
- Alan Brodrick, 2nd Viscount Midleton
- Callum Brodrick (born 1998), English cricketer
- Charles Brodrick, Archbishop of Cashel
- Cuthbert Brodrick, British architect
- George Brodrick, 2nd Earl of Midleton
- George Brodrick, 3rd Viscount Midleton
- George Charles Brodrick, British historian
- Noel Brodrick, New Zealand surveyor
- St John Brodrick, 1st Earl of Midleton
- William Brodrick (writer)
- William Brodrick, 8th Viscount Midleton
- Mary Brodrick Egyptologist

== See also ==
- Broadrick, surname
- Broderick, given name and surname
- Brodrick Peak, a mountain in New Zealand
