= Domnall mac Eimín =

Eleventh-century Mormaer of Mar

Domnall mac Eimín meic Cainnig
- Mormaer of Mar
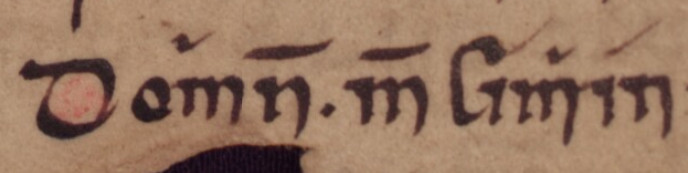
- Domnal's name as it appears on folio 36v of Oxford Bodleian Library Rawlinson B 489 (the Annals of Ulster).
- Died: 23 April 1014; Clontarf

Domnall mac Eimín meic Cainnig (died 23 April 1014) was an eleventh-century Mormaer of Mar. (Note: Since the 1990s, academics have accorded Domnall various patronyms names in English secondary sources: Domnall f. Eimin, Domnall mac Eimein mic Cainnich, Domnall mac Eimhin meic Cainnigh, Domnall mac Eimhin, Domnall mac Eimín meic Cainnig, Domnall mac Eimin mic Cainnich Móir, Domnall mac Eimin mic Cainnich, Domnall mac Eimin, Domnall mac Eimín, Domnall mac Emin, and Domnall mac Emine mic Cainnaich Móir.) He is attested by numerous accounts of the Battle of Clontarf in which he is said to have lost his life supporting the cause of Brian Bóruma mac Cennétig, High King of Ireland, a king whose forces fought against those of Sitriuc mac Amlaíb, King of Dublin, Máel Mórda mac Murchada, King of Leinster and Sigurðr Hlǫðvisson, Earl of Orkney. Domnall is the first Mormaer of Mar on record, and the Irish sources that note him are the earliest sources to note the province of Mar. Domnall is the only Scottish combatant recorded to have fought in the Battle of Clontarf. His motivations for fighting are uncertain.

== Attestations ==
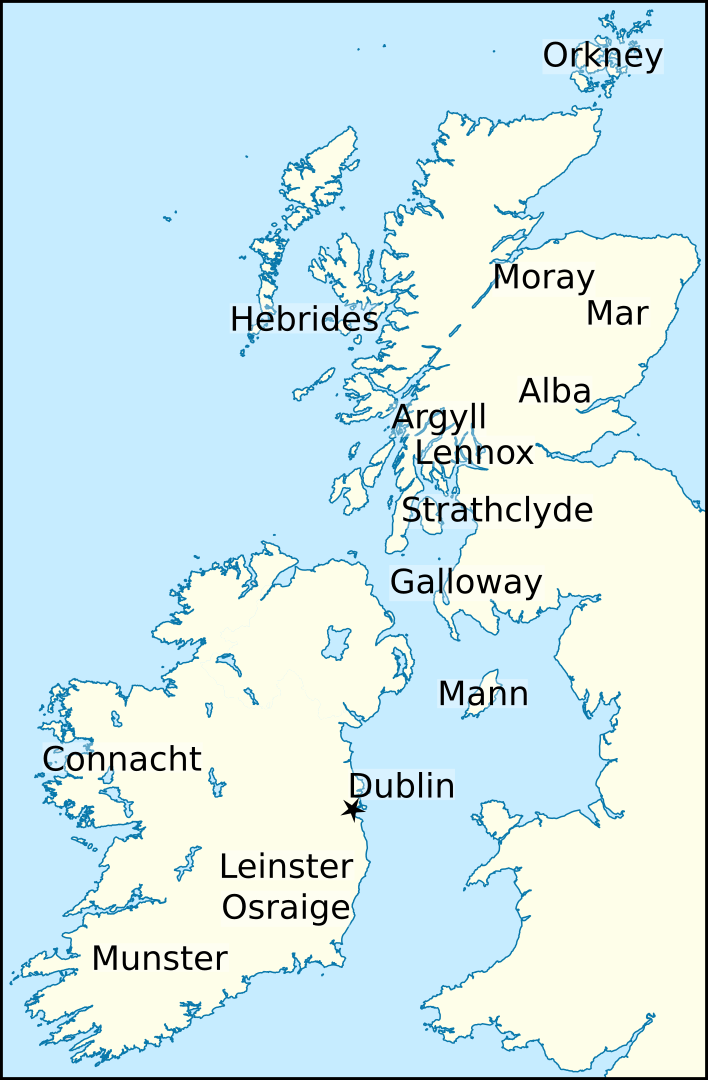
Locations relating to Domnall's life and times.

Domnall may have been of Scandinavian descent. The name of his father could be a Gaelic form of the Old Norse Eyvindr. (Note: The fifteenth- to sixteenth-century Annals of Ulster identifies Domnall as the son of Eimin, son of Cainnech. The thirteenth-century Cottonian Annals, and the sixteenth-century Annals of Loch Cé, identify Domnall's paternal grandfather as Cainnech Mór. The eleventh- or twelfth-century Cogad Gáedel re Gallaib merely identifies Domnall as the son of Eimin. According to a seventeenth-century genealogical tract compiled by Dubhaltach Óg Mac Fhirbhisigh, Domnall was descended from "Old Iomhar" and the "descendants of Leod of Arran".) Domnall was a Mormaer of Mar. The province of Mar straddled the River Dee and River Don in Aberdeenshire. By about 1100, Mar formed one of the core provinces of the Kingdom of Alba. Domnall is the earliest mormaer from the province on record. In fact, notices of Domnall in Irish sources are the earliest record of the province itself.

The meaning of the Gaelic title mormaer (plural mormaír) is uncertain. It could derive from elements meaning "sea steward" or "great steward". In historical sources, the title almost always has Scottish connotations. It appears to denote one of the most important royal officials—aside from the king—as a kind of steward or bailiff. In times of peace, a Scottish mormaer would have overseen one of the provinces of Alba, and in times of war, he would have commanded its military forces. By the twelfth century, the office of mormaer became territorialised, and the title became Latinised as comes, a term otherwise used for the English earl. (Note: Whilst Cogad Gáedel re Gallaib describes Domnall as a mormaer from Alba, the Cottonian Annals identifies him as a mormaer in Alba. The Annals of Ulster specifies that Domnall was a mormaer of Mar in Alba. The seventeenth-century Annals of Clonmacnoise erroneously identifies Domnall as the Earl of Dunbar.)

In 1014, Domnall fought and died at the Battle of Clontarf, supporting the cause of Brian Bóruma mac Cennétig, High King of Ireland. (Note: Domnall is not the earliest Scottish mormaer recorded to have fought in Ireland. In 976, three such men are recorded to have fought supporting Gilla Columb, King of Cenél Conaill.) The battle was fought by the forces of the High King of Ireland against the allied forces of Sitriuc mac Amlaíb, King of Dublin, Máel Mórda mac Murchada, King of Leinster, and Sigurðr Hlǫðvisson, Earl of Orkney. Although Brian's forces won the fight, it was a Pyrrhic victory, leaving both sides decimated, with Brian and members of his immediate family amongst the dead, and his objective of capturing Dublin left unfulfilled.

Domnall's part in the clash is noted by numerous historical sources: including the seventeenth-century Annals of Clonmacnoise, the sixteenth-century Annals of Loch Cé, the seventeenth-century Annals of the Four Masters, the fifteenth- to sixteenth-century Annals of Ulster, the twelfth-century Chronicon Scotorum, the twelfth-century Cogad Gáedel re Gallaib, and the thirteenth-century Cottonian Annals. Another important account of the battle noting Domnall is preserved within the manuscript Oxford Bodleian Library MS Rawlinson B 486. It is remarkable that the Munster-based eleventh- to fourteenth-century Annals of Inisfallen makes no notice of Domnall.

Domnall appears to have been one of the principal commanders in the battle, and appears to have commanded a portion of Brian's army composed of foreign mercenaries. The forces of the Dublin-Leinster-Orkney coalition were commanded by Máel Mórda and Sigurðr. Brian does not appear to have taken part in battle, whilst Sitriuc's part is more obscure.

According to Cogad Gáedel re Gallaib, Brian's forces were organised into three battalions. The battalion that appears to have formed the left flank is stated to have been composed of ten mormaers and their Scandinavian allies. With exception to Domnall, the obscurity of this formation's commanders is remarkable in comparison to the other battalions. This partly evinces the probability that Domnall's unit was mainly composed of Scandinavian troops. Opposite this battalion, the coalition's right flank appears to have been composite force of Scandinavian mercenaries in the fore and Leinstermen in the rear. (Note: According to the thirteenth-century Njáls saga, Sigurðr commanded the centre of the coalition forces and the flanks were commanded by Sitriuc and Bróðir. Although it is not specified, it is most probable that Sitriuc led the left flank and Bróðir the right. Njáls saga relates that Bróðir's battalion fought against one commanded by Úlfr hreða, described as a relative of Brian. This flank appears to be the battalion that Cogad Gáedel re Gallaib describes as being commanded by Máel Mórda and other Leinster monarchs.)

== Death ==
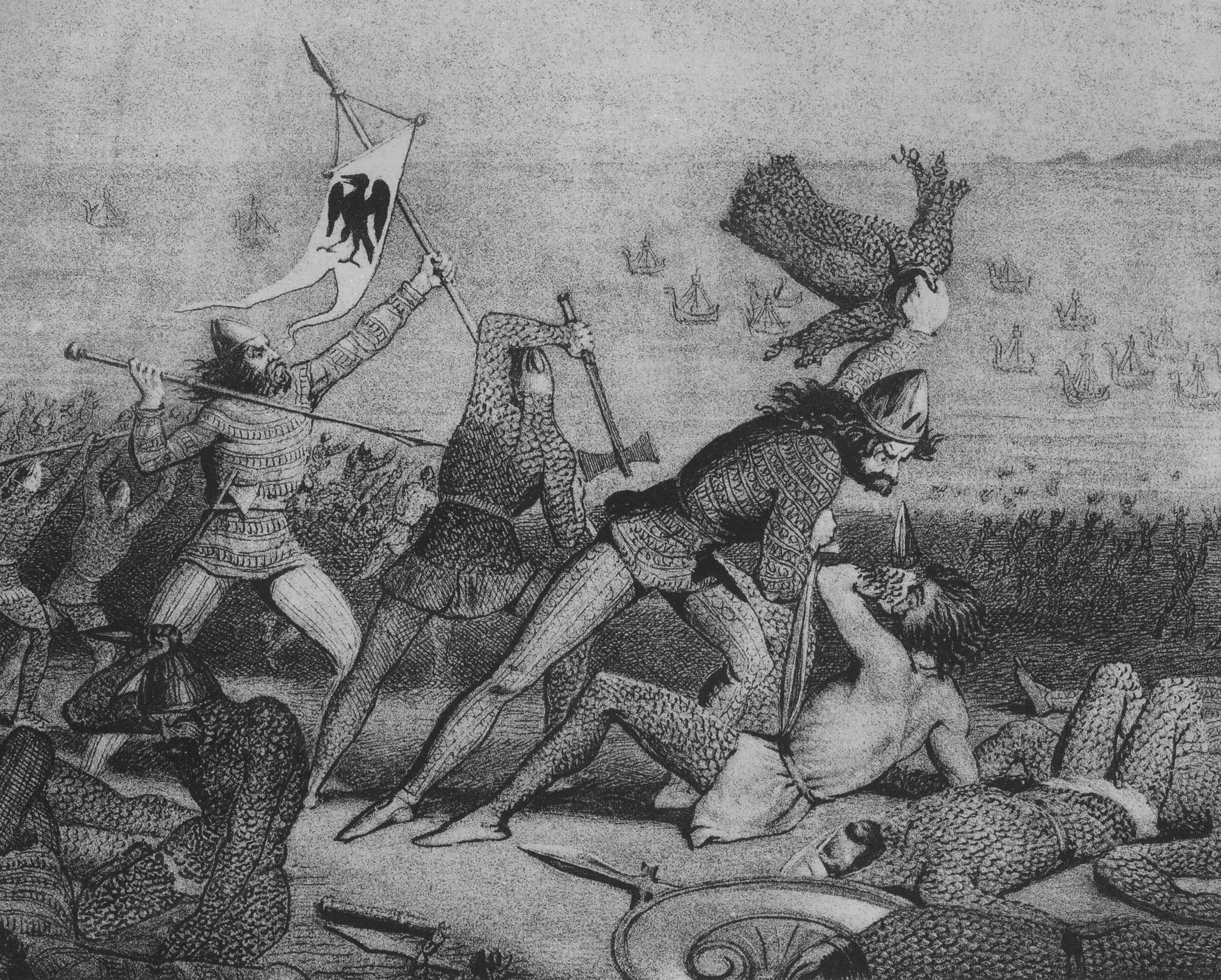
A nineteenth-century depiction of the Battle of Clontarf.

The most accurate accounts of the battle are the historical Irish chronicles. Sources such as Chronicon Scotorum, the Annals of Inisfallen, and the Annals of Ulster probably stem from contemporary reports of events. Sources such as the Annals of Clonmacnoise and the Cottonian Annals appear to incorporate latter legends. Instead of being an accurate and impartial account of history, Cogad Gáedel re Gallaib is probably a piece of Dál Cais/Uí Briain propaganda, compiled for the benefit of Brian's great-grandson, Muirchertach Ua Briain, King of Munster. (Note: The Dál Cais were a Munster people that rose to prominence in the tenth century. Brian, ancestor of the Uí Briain, became King of Dál Cais in 976.) The treatment that Cogad Gáedel re Gallaib gives to British affairs appears to reflect the eleventh- and twelfth-century ambitions of the Uí Briain in the Kingdom of the Isles. As such, there is reason to suspect that its (possibly exaggerated) depiction of Domnall may have been intended to promote a theme of shared interests between Munster and Alba. This positive portrayal of international relations reflects the political connections cultivated between Muirchertach and the Scots.

Nevertheless, Cogad Gáedel re Gallaib is the only source to give specific detail about the battle, and Domnall plays a prominent part in its account. According to this source, the night before hostilities, a certain Plait, identified as the son of the King of Lochlainn, boasted that there was no man in Ireland fit to fight him. Domnall, however, is said to have made it known that he was up to the challenge. The following day, once the battalions were arrayed on the field of battle, Plait is said to have called out Domnall, whereupon the two fight one another, dying by each other's hand. As such, according to Cogad Gáedel re Gallaib, the two were the first combatants to clash at the Battle of Clontarf. The episode concerning Domnall and Plait's fight makes up an entire chapter of this source. Whether the two actually encountered each other the night before is questionable, as is perhaps the claim that the battle began with the duel between two opposing champions. If there is any historical basis to the tale, it may be more likely that the two had crossed paths sometime previous, and that the battle merely allowed them to settle an old score.

Some of the dialogue attributed to Domnall and Plait by Cogad Gáedel re Gallaib contains Gaelicised forms of Old Norse vocabulary:

Is arsin tanic Plait a cath na lureach amach, ocus asbert fo thri faras Domnall? id est Cait ita Domnall? Ro recair Domnall ocus asbert, sund, a sniding ar se. (Then Plait came forward from the battalion of the men in armour, and said three times 'Faras Domnall?' that is 'Where is Domnall?' Domnall answered and said 'Here you wretch' said he.)

— Cogad Gáedel re Gallaib

Specifically, the Gaelic faras in this passage is a form of the Old Norse hvar es, meaning "where is"; and the Gaelic sniding is a form of the Old Norse niðingr, meaning "wretch, scoundrel". The dialogue between Domnall and Plait may therefore evince bilingualism between the two.

Domnall's first notice by Cogad Gáedel re Gallaib depicts him delivering a message from Brian to Brian's eldest son, Murchad, instructing the latter not to take an advanced position on the battlefield in front of his troops. When Murchad retorts that he is unwilling retreat one foot of land in front of his men, and declares that many false heroes will fall back and leave their share of the battle to him, Domnall swears that he will not shirk from his part. Cogad Gáedel re Gallaib then remarks that Domnall was indeed true to his word. Domnall is thus depicted as a trusted and true follower of Brian, and it is possible that this passage was intended increase the drama in preparation for the account of Domnall's final fall. There is no mention of Domnall's title in this pre-battle scene, and the text implies that Domnall was personally attached to Brian, occupying a leadership role under him.

Plait is otherwise unrecorded by historical chronicles. If Cogad Gáedel re Gallaib was indeed authored at the behest of Muirchertach, one possibility is that Plait is merely a literary invention intended to reflect relations between Muirchertach and the Kingdom of Norway. Although Muirchertach faced a serious threat from Magnús Óláfsson, King of Norway during his reign, the two orchestrated a marriage alliance between Muirchertach's daughter, Bjaðmunjo, and Magnús' son, Sigurðr. When Magnús was killed in 1103, Sigurðr returned to Norway, leaving Bjaðmunjo behind. It is remarkable that Plait—described as the son of the King of Lochlainn—is one of the few Scandinavians noted for bravery by Cogad Gáedel re Gallaib. This may reflect relations between Muirchertach and Sigurðr, who, according to the thirteenth-century Morkinskinna, exacted tribute from Ireland during his reign as King of Norway.

== Context ==
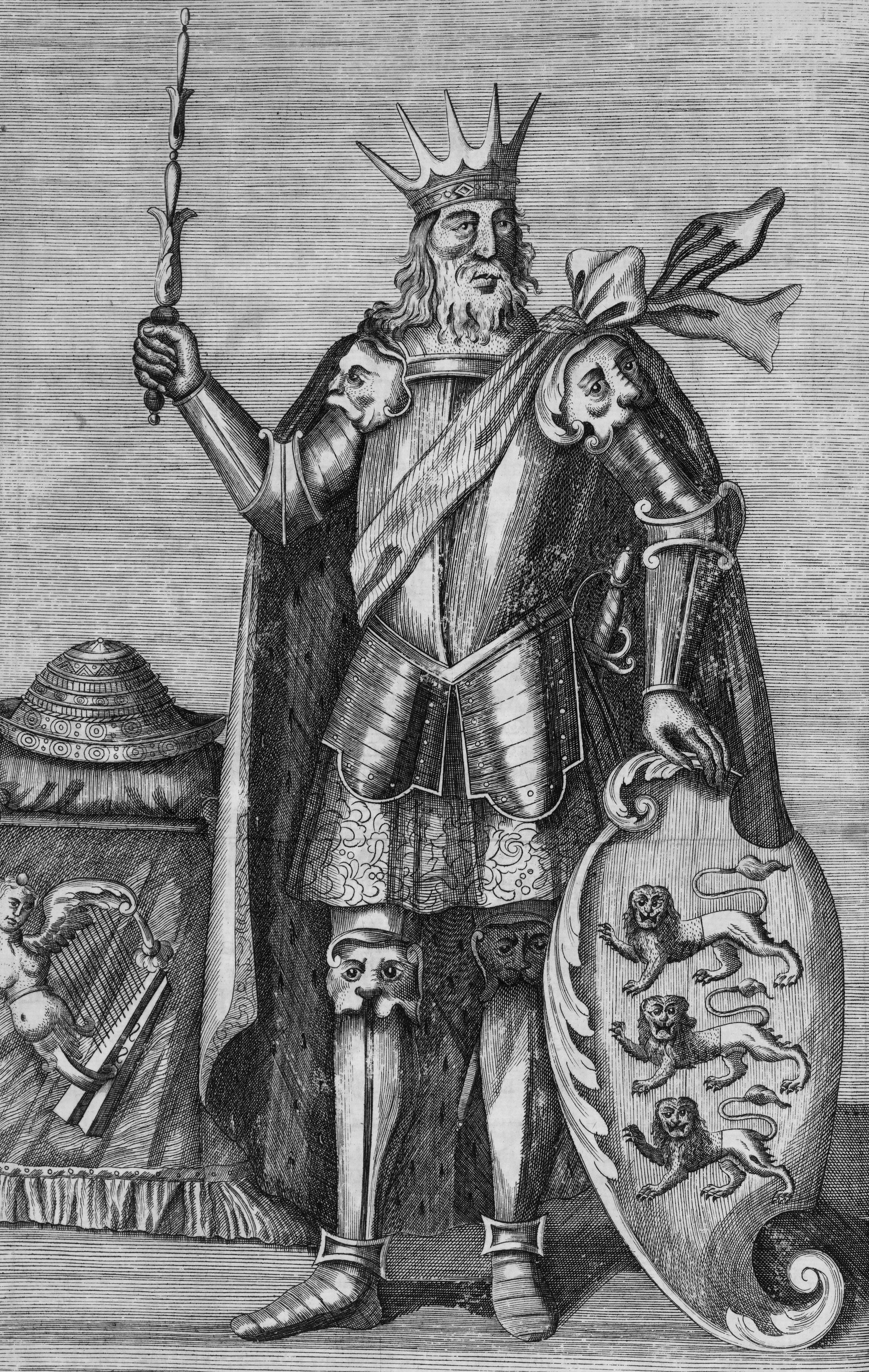
An eighteenth-century depiction of Brian Bóruma mac Cennétig, probably the earliest depiction of the king.

Domnall is the only man from Alba recorded to have died at the Battle of Clontarf. (Note: Nevertheless, according to Cogad Gáedel re Gallaib, a certain Arnaill Scot fell fighting amongst the Dubliners against the Connachtmen at Dubgall's Bridge. The personal name accorded to this man may be a form of the Old Norse Arnaldr, and his epithet could be evidence of a Scottish or Irish association.) The fact that surviving sources focus upon the slain makes it uncertain if there were other leaders from Alba present. Domnall's part in the battle partly evinces the international nature of the clash, and may be indicative of Brian's diplomatic ability. Nevertheless, it is uncertain in what context he took part in it. On one hand, Domnall may have merely acted as a hired mercenary, or perhaps as a dislocated nobleman exiled from Alba. If he had been fostered by an Irish family, it is also conceivable that Domnall could have felt obliged to serve alongside them.

According to Cogad Gáedel re Gallaib, Brian took tribute throughout the Irish Sea region, including from the men of Lennox and Argyll. If there is any truth to this claim, it could be evidence of otherwise unrecorded contact between Brian and the Scots that could account for Domnall's part in the battle. (Note: It is possible that Lennox formed part of the Kingdom of Strathclyde or Galloway in 1014. Nevertheless, the fact that Cogad Gáedel re Gallaib was probably compiled for the benefit of Muirchertach suggests that the boastful passage about Brian's overseas authority is reflective of either Muirchertach's own sphere of influence or his sphere of ambition.) Less than a decade before the battle, in 1005, Máel Coluim mac Cináeda overturned his cousin, Cináed mac Duib, King of Alba, and seized the kingship of Alba. That very year, Brian made a donation of gold to the church of Armagh—an eminent religious centre of the people of both Ireland and Alba—and recognised its claims of ecclesiastical supremacy throughout Ireland. Seemingly to mark this occasion, Brian was styled Imperator Scottorum by the Book of Armagh, a Latin title that could refer to claims of authority over not only the Irish, but also the Scandinavians of Ireland and the Isles, and the Gaels of Alba. (Note: Other translations of this Latin title are: "Emperor of the Gaels", "emperor of the Gaels", "emperor of the Goídil", "emperor of the Irish", "Emperor of the Irish", "Emperor of the Scoti", "Emperor of the Scoti", "emperor of the Scots", and "emperor of the Scotti".) Whether there is any connection between Brian's imperial title and Domnall's presence at Clontarf is uncertain, although it could account for the Scottish presence at the battle, and may be evidence that Domnall recognised Brian's authority.

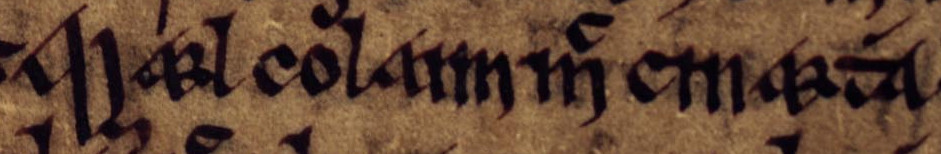
The name of Máel Coluim mac Cináeda as it appears on folio 16v of Oxford Bodleian Library Rawlinson B 488 (the Annals of Tigernach): "Mael Colaim mac Cínaetha".

There is reason to suspect that Domnall's participation stemmed from dynastic discord in Alba. As such, the record of Domnall at Clontarf could be evidence that a Scottish faction, with designs upon the kingship of Alba, aligned itself with Brian and recognised his overlordship in pursuit of its royal ambitions. Little is known of Máel Coluim's reign. There is reason to suspect that his rule was challenged by Clann Ruaidrí, the family that held the mormaership of Moray. During his reign, for example, two members of this kindred—Findláech mac Ruaidrí and Máel Coluim mac Maíl Brígte—are styled as kings by certain Irish sources in records of their deaths. These obituaries—given by the Annals of Tigernach and the Annals of Ulster—could indicate that there was a certain degree of reservation in Ireland regarding Máel Coluim's royal legitimacy. Nevertheless, the fact that the Annals of Inisfallen ignores the deaths of these Moravians—unlike the Annals of Tigernach, Annals of Ulster, Chronicon Scotorum, and the thirteenth-century Book of Leinster—could be evidence that the Kings of Munster were either uninterested or opposed to them. Although it is possible that the Moravians launched their bid for the kingship immediately after Máel Coluim's violent accession, they could have capitalised upon any event between Cináed's death and the notice of Findláech's royal title in 1020. One such point may have been the aftermath of the Battle of Clontarf.

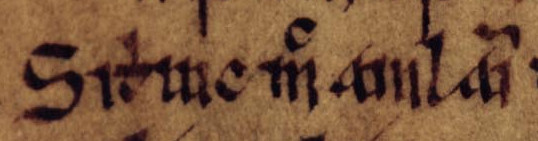
The name of Sitriuc mac Amlaíb as it appears on folio 16v of Oxford Bodleian Library Rawlinson B 488: "Sitriuic mac Amlaim".

Even though Máel Coluim was not a combatant at Clontarf, and the battle had no direct bearing on his kingship, there is evidence to indicate that several associates of his may have been involved. For example, the twelfth-century Prophecy of Berchán, states that Máel Coluim was the son of Leinsterwoman, whereas the thirteenth-century Orkneyinga saga states that Sigurðr was married to a daughter of Máel Coluim. Another figure recorded to have fallen at the battle is Gilla Ciaráin, an apparent senior member of the Uí Ímair who may be identical to Gilli, a Hebridean earl who, according to the thirteenth-century Njáls saga, governed the Hebrides under Sigurðr's overlordship. Furthermore, the mother of Sitriuc was also from Leinster, and thus possibly a kinsman of Máel Coluim.

The name Sigurðr Hlǫðvisson as it appears on folio 12v of AM 45 fol (Codex Frisianus): "Sigvrðr Loðvisson".

The customary allegiance of the people of Mar is unknown, and it is uncertain whether Domnall's part in the fray is evidence that Brian was aligned with Máel Coluim or Findláech. Whilst it is possible that Domnall was lending assistance to Brian on behalf of Máel Coluim—or that Máel Coluim was at least aware of Domnall's alliance and allowed him to campaign overseas—another possibility is that Domnall's actions were undertaken independently of Máel Coluim, and that Domnall did so in the context of settling a private score with Sigurðr. In fact, Máel Coluim could well have been wary of the ambitions of the Uí Ímair and Orcadians, and it is possible that he decided to remain a neutral player in their struggle against Brian.

The evidence that Máel Coluim's mother was a Leinsterwoman, and that Sigurðr was his son-in-law, suggest that Máel Coluim may have been inclined to side with Sitriuc and Sigurðr against Brian. It may be that Domnall's support of Brian stemmed from these close ties of kinship between Máel Coluim and Sigurðr, and that Domnall's presence at Clontarf was a reaction to the threat of this alliance. The fact that Domnall risked—and lost—his life to support Brian's cause could be evidence that Domnall was indeed opposed to Sigurðr and Máel Coluim. (Note: Sigurðr is further associated with Ireland by Orkneyinga saga, which states that his mother was a daughter of Kjarvalr Írakonungr—an apparent King of Osraige. The Kingdom of Osraige buffered Brian's Kingdom of Munster and the Kingdom of Leinster. If Máel Coluim and Sigurðr indeed had blood connections with Ireland, it is conceivable that both harboured Irish ambitions.)

One reason why some foreigners may have sided with Brian is because of growing unease of Sigurðr's growing power. The threat of this Orcadian ascendance could have spurned Máel Coluim to counter Sigurðr by sending Domnall overseas to assist Brian. If Domnall indeed campaigned on Máel Coluim's behalf, and if Máel Coluim was indeed descended from a Leinsterwoman, another possibility is that Máel Coluim's Leinster kinsmen were rivals of Máel Mórda. As such, it is conceivable that Domnall's support of Brian could have stemmed from inter-dynastic discord in Ireland.
