= The Weaver's Scar: For Our Rwanda =

- First edition
- Author: Brian Crawford
- Language: English
- Publisher: Royal Fireworks Press
- Publication date: 2013

The Weaver's Scar: For Our Rwanda is the first young adult novel written in English and for an American audience that deals directly with the Rwandan genocide of 1994. It was written by Brian Crawford and published in 2013 by Royal Fireworks Press, the novel was the recipient of the 2014 Skipping Stones Honor Award for Multicultural and International Books; VOYA Magazine also awarded the novel a place in its 2014 Top Shelf Fiction for Middle School Readers. The Weaver's Scar received praise from experts, established authors, Africa Access, and The School Library Journal. The novel relates the story of Faustin, a Tutsi teen who is forced to flee the mounting ethnic violence with Déo, an unlikely friend.
