= Senator Broderick (disambiguation) =

David C. Broderick (1820–1859) was a U.S. Senator from California from 1857 to 1859. Senator Broderick may also refer to:

- Case Broderick (1839–1920), Kansas State Senate
- John Broderick (politician) (1865–1939), Illinois State Senate
- Mike Broderick (born 1939), South Dakota State Senate
