= Broadrick =

Broadrick is a surname. Notable people with the surname include:

- Annette Broadrick (born 1938), American novel writer
- Justin Broadrick (born 1969), English musician, singer and songwriter
  - Justin Broadrick discography

== Other uses ==
- Broadrick v. Oklahoma, US Supreme Court decision
- Broadrick Secondary School, Singapore

== See also ==
- Brodrick
- Broderick (disambiguation)
