= John Broderick =

John Broderick may refer to:

- John Broderick (writer) (1924–1989), Irish novelist
- John Broderick (producer) (1942–2001), American film producer, entertainer and editor
- John Broderick (politician) (1865–1939), Irish-born Chicago politician, member of the Illinois state senate
- John R. Broderick (born 1955), American academic administrator
- John T. Broderick Jr. (born 1947), former chief justice of the New Hampshire Supreme Court
- J. J. Broderick (John Joyce Broderick, 1882–1933), British diplomat
- Jack Broderick (John Charles Broderick, 1877–1957), Canadian Olympic lacrosse player
- Johnny Broderick (1894–1966), New York City police detective
- Johnny Broderick (pianist) (1901–1977), American pianist, composer, songwriter, and vaudeville performer
