= List of international cricket centuries by Shai Hope =

Barbadian cricketer

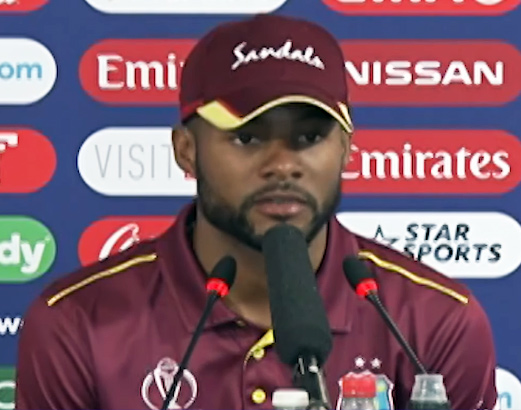
Shai Hope has scored 28 centuries in international cricket.

Shai Diego Hope (born 10 November 1993) is a Barbadian cricketer who has played for the West Indies cricket team. A right-handed batsman and wicket-keeper, he has scored 29 centuries in international cricket: 5 in Test cricket, 21 in One Day International (ODI) cricket and 3 in Twenty20 International (T20I) cricket. (Note: Hope is among the West Indies' leading century-makers in international cricket.)

Hope made his Test debut against England on 1 May 2015 at Kensington Oval in Bridgetown, Barbados. He scored his maiden Test century during the 2017 tour of England, making 147 and an unbeaten 118 in the second Test at Headingley. His two centuries made him the first batsman to score a century in each innings of a first-class match at Headingley. The West Indies won the match by five wickets after successfully chasing 322. His highest Test score is 147.

Hope made his ODI debut against Sri Lanka in November 2016. He scored his maiden ODI century against Zimbabwe in Bulawayo, scoring 101. His highest ODI score is an unbeaten 170, which he scored against Ireland in 2019. In August 2022, Hope scored a century in his 100th ODI against India, becoming the tenth West Indies player to score a century in his 100th ODI. In February 2023, he was appointed captain of the West Indies ODI team.

== Key ==
- * – Remained not out
- ‡ – Captain of West Indies in that match
- † – Man of the match

== Test centuries ==
List of Test centuries scored by Shai Hope
| No. | Score | Opponent | Venue | Date | Result | Ref |
|---|---|---|---|---|---|---|
| 1 | 147 | England | Headingley, Leeds | 25–29 August 2017 | Won | |
| 2 | 118* | England | Headingley, Leeds | 25–29 August 2017 | Won | |
| 3 | 103 | India | Arun Jaitley Cricket Stadium, New Delhi | 10–14 October 2025 | Lost | |
| 4 | 140 | New Zealand | Hagley Oval, Christchurch | 2–6 December 2025 | Drawn | |
| 5 | 112 | Sri Lanka | Sir Vivian Richards Stadium, North Sound | 3–7 July 2026 | Drawn | |

== One Day International centuries ==
List of ODI centuries scored by Shai Hope
| No. | Score | Opponent | Venue | Date | Result | Ref |
|---|---|---|---|---|---|---|
| 1 | 101 † | Zimbabwe | Queens Sports Club, Bulawayo | 19 November 2016 | Tied | |
| 2 | 123* | India | ACA–VDCA Cricket Stadium, Visakhapatnam | 24 October 2018 | Tied | |
| 3 | 146* † | Bangladesh | Shere Bangla National Stadium, Dhaka | 11 December 2018 | Won | |
| 4 | 108* | Bangladesh | Sylhet International Cricket Stadium, Sylhet | 14 December 2018 | Lost | |
| 5 | 170 | Ireland | Castle Avenue, Dublin | 5 May 2019 | Won | |
| 6 | 109 † | Bangladesh | Castle Avenue, Dublin | 7 May 2019 | Lost | |
| 7 | 109* † | Afghanistan | Ekana Cricket Stadium, Lucknow | 11 November 2019 | Won | |
| 8 | 102* | India | MA Chidambaram Stadium, Chennai | 15 December 2019 | Won | |
| 9 | 115 | Sri Lanka | Sinhalese Sports Club Ground, Colombo | 22 February 2020 | Lost | |
| 10 | 110 † | Sri Lanka | Sir Vivian Richards Stadium, North Sound | 10 March 2021 | Won | |
| 11 | 119* † | Netherlands | VRA Cricket Ground, Amstelveen | 31 May 2022 | Won | |
| 12 | 127 | Pakistan | Multan Cricket Stadium, Multan | 8 June 2022 | Lost | |
| 13 | 115 | India | Queen's Park Oval, Port of Spain | 24 July 2022 | Lost | |
| 14 | 128* ‡ † | South Africa | Buffalo Park, East London | 18 March 2023 | Won | |
| 15 | 132 ‡ † | Nepal | Harare Sports Club, Harare | 22 June 2023 | Won | |
| 16 | 109* ‡ † | England | Sir Vivian Richards Stadium, North Sound | 3 December 2023 | Won | |
| 17 | 117 ‡ | England | Sir Vivian Richards Stadium, North Sound | 2 November 2024 | Lost | |
| 18 | 120* ‡ † | Pakistan | Brian Lara Stadium, San Fernando | 12 August 2025 | Won | |
| 19 | 109* ‡ † | New Zealand | McLean Park, Napier | 19 November 2025 | Lost | |
| 20 | 104 ‡ | India | Assam Cricket Association Stadium, Guwahati | 30 September 2026 | Lost | |
| 21 | 162* ‡ † | India | Maharaja Yadavindra Singh International Cricket Stadium, Mullanpur | 3 October 2026 | Won | |

== Twenty20 International centuries ==
List of T20I centuries scored by Shai Hope
| No. | Score | Opponent | Venue | Date | Result | Ref |
|---|---|---|---|---|---|---|
| 1 | 102* ‡ | Australia | Warner Park, Basseterre | 25 July 2025 | Lost | |
| 2 | 102* ‡ † | India | JSCA International Stadium Complex, Ranchi | 9 October 2026 | Won | |
| 3 | 102* ‡ † | India | Rajiv Gandhi International Cricket Stadium, Uppal, Hyderabad | 14 October 2026 | Won | |

== Team wise record ==
Centuries against different nations
| Opponent | Test | ODI | T20I | Total |
|---|---|---|---|---|
| Afghanistan | – | 1 | – | 1 |
| Australia | – | – | 1 | 1 |
| Bangladesh | – | 3 | – | 3 |
| England | 2 | 2 | – | 4 |
| India | 1 | 5 | 2 | 8 |
| Ireland | – | 1 | – | 1 |
| Netherlands | – | 1 | – | 1 |
| Nepal | – | 1 | – | 1 |
| New Zealand | 1 | 1 | – | 2 |
| Pakistan | – | 2 | – | 2 |
| South Africa | – | 1 | – | 1 |
| Sri Lanka | 1 | 2 | – | 3 |
| Zimbabwe | – | 1 | – | 1 |
| Total | 5 | 21 | 3 | 29 |
