= Battle of Clontarf =

1014 battle between the Kingdom of Ireland and an Irish-Norse alliance

- Part of the Viking invasions of Ireland
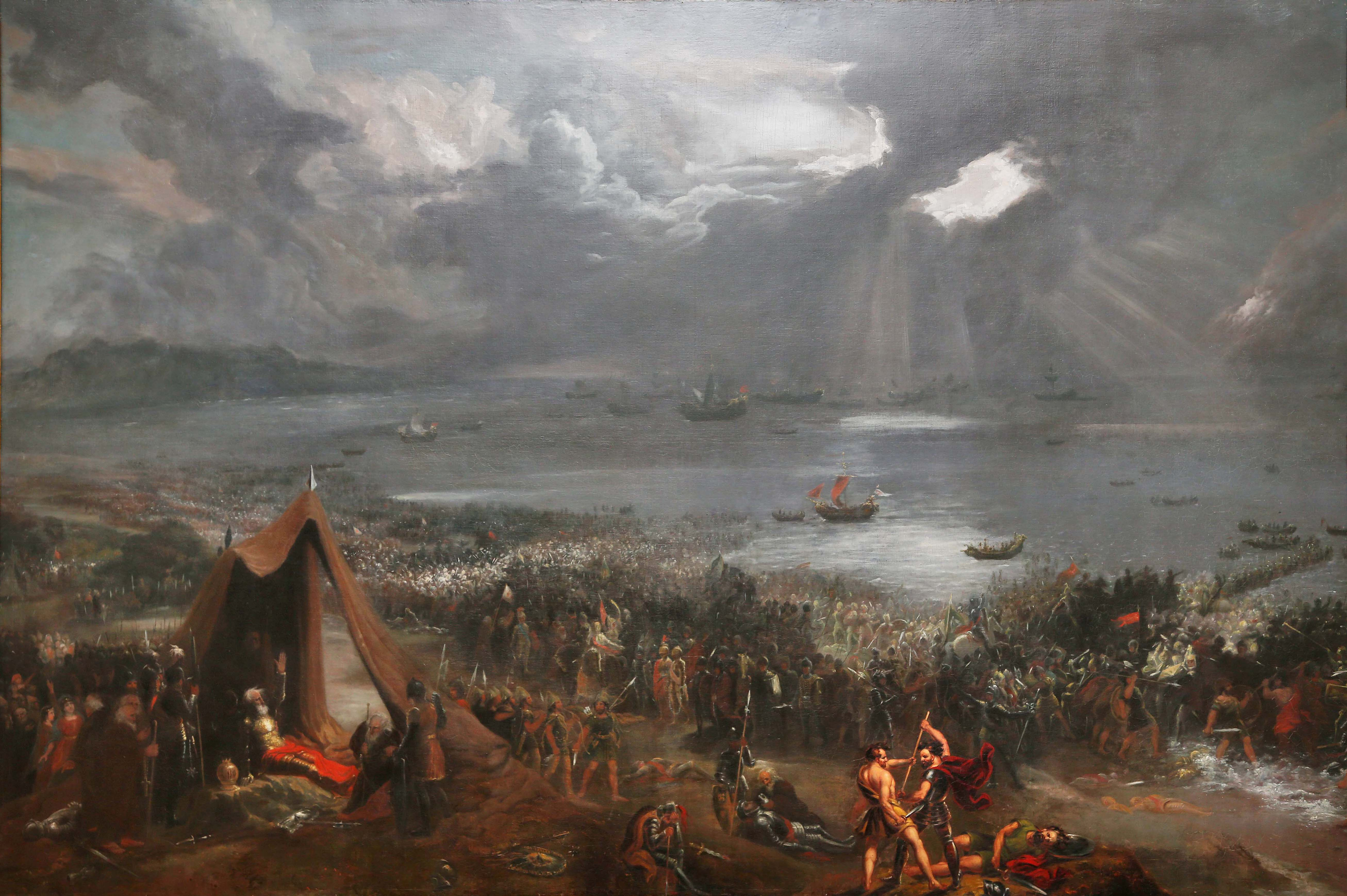
- Battle of Clontarf; Hugh Frazer, 1826
Date	23 April 1014
Location	Clontarf, Dublin 53°21′54″N 06°11′51″W
Result	Irish victory: Viking power in Ireland broken; Death of Brian Boru

Belligerents
Forces of the High King of Ireland	Kingdom of Dublin; Kingdom of Leinster; Kingdom of the Isles; Earldom of Orkney

Commanders and leaders
Brian Boru †; Murchad mac Briain †	Sigtrygg Silkbeard; Máel Mórda mac Murchada †; Sigurd the Stout †; Brodir †

Strength
5,000 men	~7,000 men

Casualties and losses
4,000 dead	~6,000 dead
- Location within Dublin Battle of Clontarf (island of Ireland)

The Battle of Clontarf (Irish: Cath Chluain Tarbh) took place on 23 April 1014 at Clontarf, near Dublin, on the east coast of Ireland. It pitted an army led by Brian Boru, High King of Ireland, against a Norse-Irish alliance comprising the forces of Sigtrygg Silkbeard, King of Dublin; Máel Mórda mac Murchada, King of Leinster; and a Viking army from abroad led by Sigurd of Orkney and Brodir of Mann. It lasted from sunrise to sunset, and ended in a rout of the Viking and Leinster armies.

It is estimated that between 7,000 and 10,000 men were killed in the battle, including most of the leaders. Although Brian's forces were victorious, Brian himself was killed, as were his son Murchad and his grandson Toirdelbach. Leinster king Máel Mórda and Viking leaders Sigurd and Brodir were also slain. After the battle, the power of the Vikings and the Kingdom of Dublin was largely broken.

The battle was an important event in Irish history and is recorded in both Irish and Norse chronicles. In Ireland, the battle came to be seen as an event that freed the Irish from foreign domination, and Brian was hailed as a national hero. This view was especially popular during the period of British rule in Ireland. Although the battle has come to be viewed in a more critical light, it still has a hold on the popular imagination.

== Background ==
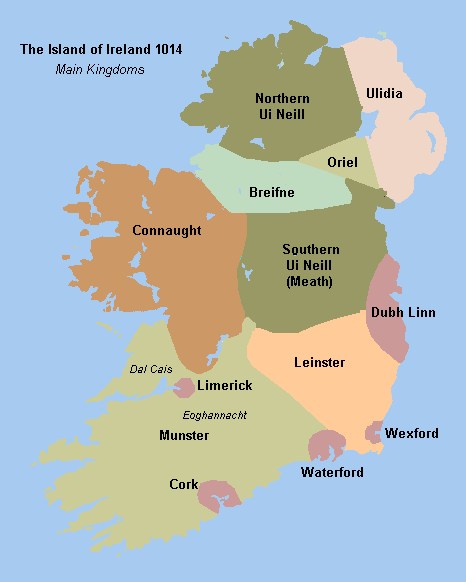
Map of the larger Irish kingdoms in 1014

The Vikings (or Norsemen) began carrying out raids on Gaelic Ireland in the late eighth century, and over the following few decades they founded a number of settlements along the coast. Vikings first established themselves in Dublin in 838 when they built a fortified area, or longphort, there. During the tenth century, Viking Dublin developed into the Kingdom of Dublin—a thriving town and a large area of the surrounding countryside, whose rulers controlled extensive territories in the Irish Sea and, at one time, York. Over time, many Vikings were assimilated into Gaelic society and became the Norse-Gaels. Dublin was closely involved in the affairs of the Kingdom of the Isles, which included the Isle of Man and the Hebrides, and when the Dublin king Amlaíb Cuarán was defeated by Máel Sechnaill mac Domnaill at the Battle of Tara in 980, he was supported by the men of the Isles. Amlaíb's son, Sigtrygg Silkbeard, who was King of Dublin from 990, allied himself with his uncle Máel Mórda mac Murchada, King of Leinster. They met Máel Sechnaill mac Domnaill and Brian Boru at the Battle of Glenmama in 999, where they were defeated.

From the time of the seventh century and the reign of Domnall mac Áedo, the kingship of Tara was a title which was strongly associated with the high kingship of Ireland and was held by members of the Uí Néill dynasty, who controlled the northern half of Ireland. In the tenth century, the Dál gCais, until then a small kingdom in what is now County Clare, began to expand. By the time of his death in 951, Cennétig mac Lorcáin had become King of Thomond. His son, Mathgamain mac Cennétig, was King of Munster when he died in 976. Mathgamain's brother, Brian Boru, quickly asserted his claim to the kingship of Munster, then invaded Leinster and gained its submission. In 998 he attacked the Uí Néill stronghold of Meath. Máel Sechnaill responded by attacking Munster in 999, and over the following years the two kings struggled for supremacy in Ireland. In 997, Brian and Máel Sechnaill met in Clonfert and reached an agreement where they recognised each other's reign over their respective halves of the country—Máel Sechnaill in the north and Brian in the south. Brian received the hostages of Leinster and Dublin from Máel Seachnaill, and surrendered the hostages of Connacht to him. The peace was short-lived. After they had jointly defeated the Vikings at Glenmama, Brian resumed his attacks on Máel Seachnaill. He marched on Tara in 1000 with the combined armies of Munster, Osraige, Leinster, and Dublin, but after an advance party consisting of the latter two groups was destroyed by Máel Sechnaill, Brian Boru withdrew from the area without giving battle. In 1002 he marched with the same army to Athlone, and took the hostages of Connacht and Meath. He was now the undisputed High King of Ireland.

== Revolt of Dublin and Leinster ==
Brian consolidated his hold on Ireland by eventually obtaining the submission of the northern territories of Cenél nEógain, Cenél Conaill, and Ulaid, following a series of circuits of the northern part of the island. He completed the task when, following "a great hosting...by land and sea" into the Uí Néill territory of Cenél Conaill in 1011, the king was brought south to Dál gCais territory to submit to Brian Boru in person at his royal site of Cenn Corad. It was not long, however, before fighting was renewed. Flaithbertach Ua Néill, King of the Cenél nEógain, resented the rise of Brian Boru. Had the old political order persisted, Flaithbertach would have been in line to succeed to the high-kingship. He attacked his Cenél Conaill neighbours in 1012 but, while doing so, Máel Seachnaill attacked the Cenél nEógain inauguration site of Tullahoge. Flaithbertach in turn raided Meath the following year and Máel Sechnaill was forced to back down. Sigtrygg and Máel Mórda took advantage, and themselves raided Meath. Máel Sechnaill sent his army to raid the hinterland north of Dublin as far as Howth but he was defeated. He lost two hundred men including his son Flann. Sigtrygg then sent a fleet along the coast to attack the Munster town of Cork, but that was defeated, and Sigtrygg's nephew was killed. A full-scale conflict was inevitable. Brian brought his army to Leinster in 1013, and camped outside Dublin from September until the end of the year.

Sigtrygg went overseas in search of Viking support and enlisted the help of Sigurd Hlodvirsson, the Earl of Orkney and Brodir, a warrior of the Isle of Man. According to the Icelandic Njáls saga, Sigtrygg promised both men the kingship of Ireland if they defeated Brian. In early 1014, Sveinn Forkbeard, King of Denmark, had invaded and become the first Norse king of England.

The Viking fleets of Orkney and Mann sailed into Dublin in Holy Week 1014. Brian mustered the army of Munster, which was joined by Máel Sechnaill and two Connacht kings, Mael Ruanaidh Ua hEidhin, King of Uí Fiachrach Aidhne, and Tadhg Ua Cellaigh, King of Uí Maine, and they marched on Dublin.

== Battle ==
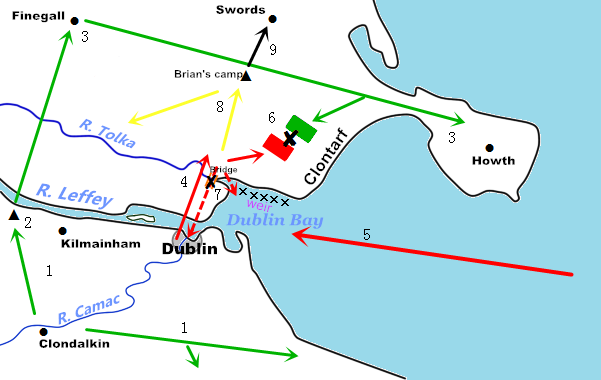
1. Clondalkin and Kilmainham were plundered, Brian's son Donnchad (Donough) sacked Leinster (1014); 2. Brian's forces began war, camped near Kilmainham; 3. Finegall and Howth were plundered; 4. Vikings left Dublin to engage Brian; 5. Overseas Viking fleet arrived; 6. Battle of Clontarf; 7. Retreat of Vikings, some drowned in the sea, some forced through Dubgall's Bridge and were attacked again, a few returned to Dublin; 8. Brodar's possible route, killed Brian and was killed himself; 9. Brian's remains to Swords, then to Armagh.

No order of battle is given in the contemporary sources; the only leaders named are those who died in the battle. The nearest contemporary accounts are the Annals of Inisfallen and the Annals of Ulster. Among the fallen on Brian's side, they name the High King himself, his son Murchad, and his grandson Toirdelbach, as well as his nephew Conaing, Domnall mac Diarmata of Corcu Baiscind (County Clare), Mac Bethad mac Muiredaig of Ciarraige Luachra (County Kerry), Mael Ruanaidh Ua hEidhin of Uí Fiachrach Aidhne, and Tadhg Ua Cellaigh of Uí Maine (both in south Connacht). The Annals of the Four Masters note several other significant deaths, including Eocha, son of Dunadhach, Chief of Clann-Scannail; Tadhg Ua Ceallaigh, lord of Ui Maine; Maelruanaidh na Paidre Ua hEidhin, lord of Aidhne; Geibheannach, son of Dubhagan, lord of Feara-Maighe; Mac-Beatha, son of Muireadhach Claen, lord of Ciarraighe-Luachra; Scannail, son of Cathal, lord of Eóganacht Locha Léin; and Domhnall, son of Eimhin, son of Cainneach, great steward of Mair in Alba (modern Scotland).

On the opposing side are named Máel Morda, Dubgall mac Amlaíb (brother of Sigtrygg), Gilla Ciaráin mac Glún Iairn (probably a nephew of Sigtrygg), Sigurd Hlodvirsson of Orkney, and Brodir, commander of the Viking fleet. No notables from Meath are recorded among the slain; leading to the suggestion that, if present, Máel Sechnaill kept himself and his forces out of harm's way. But the Annals of Ulster say that Máel Sechnaill and Brian rode together to Dublin, and the Annals of the Four Masters go so far as to say that it was Máel Sechnaill who won the day, and completed the rout after the death of Brian. On the other hand, Cogad Gáedel re Gallaib ("The War of the Irish with the Foreigners"), says that the men of Meath came to the muster with Brian, but "were not faithful to him".

According to the Cogad, after his arrival at Dublin, Brian sent his forces north across the river to plunder the area known as Fine Gall, and they torched the country as far as Howth. Brian, now in his seventies, did not go with them but stayed behind to pray. The Dublin forces set out by land, and were joined at Clontarf at high tide by the Viking fleet that was in Dublin Bay.

The front line of the Dublin-Leinster forces were the foreign Vikings, led by Brodir, Sigurd, and a man called Plait, described as "the bravest knight of all the foreigners". Behind them were the men of Dublin, commanded by Dubgall mac Amlaíb and Gilla Ciaráin mac Glún Iairn. Behind them again came the Leinstermen, headed by Máel Mórda. Sigtrygg remained in Dublin with enough men to defend it should the battle go against them. He watched the battle from the walls with his wife Sláine, the daughter of Brian.

At the front of Brian's forces were the Dál gCais, led by Brian's son Murchad, Murchad's fifteen-year-old son Toirdelbach, Brian's brother Cudulligh, and Domnall mac Diarmata of Corcu Baiscind. Behind them were the other forces of Munster, commanded by Mothla mac Domnaill mic Fáeláin, King of the Déisi Muman, and Magnus mac Amchada, King of Uí Liatháin. Next came the Connachta, led by Mael Ruanaidh Ua hEidhin and Tadhg Ua Cellaigh. Also alongside was Ó Fearghail lords of Annaly. To one side of them were Brian's Viking allies; Fergal ua Ruairc, with the Uí Briúin and the Conmhaicne was placed on the left flank. After the Connachta came Máel Sechnaill and the men of Meath, but (the Cogad says) he had made an agreement with the men of Dublin that if he would not attack them, they would not attack him.

The battle opened with Plait taunting Domnall mac Eimín, a Scottish ally of Brian. The two men marched out into the middle of the field and fought, and both died, "with the sword of each through the heart of the other, and the hair of each in the clenched hand of the other."

Then the battle proper got under way. It is described in the Cogad as remarkably loud and bloody. The men of Connacht fought the men of Dublin, and the fighting was so fierce that only 100 Connachtmen and twenty Dublinmen survived. The last casualties occurred at "Dubgall's Bridge", which Seán Duffy suggests was a bridge over the River Tolka, on the road back to Dublin. Brian's son Murchad, at the head of the Dál gCais army, took on the foreign Vikings and, according to the Cogad, he himself killed 100 of the enemy—fifty with the sword in his right hand and fifty with the sword in his left. The Vikings wore mail; the Irish did not. Yet the Irish gained the advantage, partly through the use of small spears, which they hurled at the enemy, and partly through numerical superiority.

The battle, which had begun at first light, lasted all day. Eventually, the Dublin-Leinster forces broke, and some withdrew towards their ships, while others made for a nearby wood. However, the tide had come in again, cutting off the passage to the wood, but also carrying off the Viking ships. With no way out, they were killed in large numbers, many of them by drowning. Samuel Haughton, in 1860, calculated that the tide at Clontarf would have been high at 5:30 am and again at 5:55 pm, which is consistent with the account in the Cogad. It was at this point that Brian's grandson Toirdelbach was killed. He pursued the enemy into the sea, but was hit by a wave and thrown up against the weir, and drowned. Murchad killed Sigurd, the earl of Orkney, but shortly afterwards he himself was killed. Brian was in his tent praying when Brodir found him, and killed him. Brodir himself was then killed, possibly by Ulf the Quarrelsome. According to the Cogad Gáedel re Gallaib, Brian was visited by a Banshee-like spirit named Aibhill prior to the battle who warned him of his impending demise.

== Aftermath ==
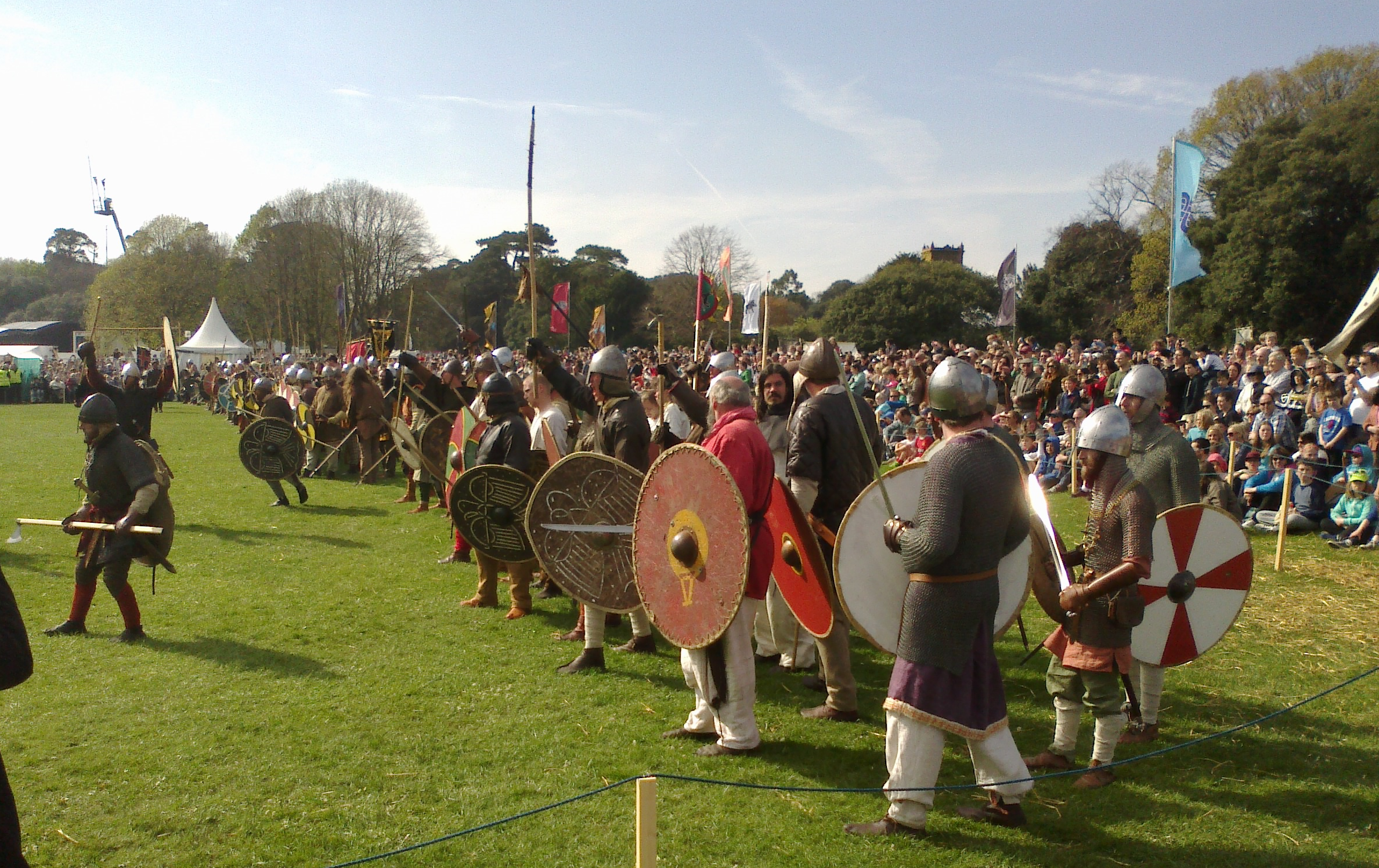
Viking re-enactors from all over the world at the Battle of Clontarf millennium commemoration in Saint Anne's Park, Dublin (lining up before charging at the opposition). 19 April 2014.

Brian's body was brought to Swords, north of Dublin. There it was met by the coarb of Patrick, the traditional head of the church in Ireland, who brought the body back with him to Armagh, where it was interred after twelve days of mourning. Along with Brian were the body of Murchad and the heads of Conaing, Brian's nephew, and Mothla, King of the Déisi Muman. Máel Sechnaill was restored as High King of Ireland, and remained secure in his position until his death in 1022.

Though the Annals imply that life was not much changed after the death of Brian Boru, it created a succession crisis, as Brian's son and heir Murchad had died as well. Brian had two remaining sons who could challenge for the kingship: Donnchad mac Briain, his son with Gormflaith and Tadc mac Briain, his son with Echrad. According to the annals, Donnchad rallied the forces of the Dál gCais at Clontarf and led them home to Cenn Corad.

Within weeks the Dál gCais, under the new leadership of Donnchad, were battling their old masters in Munster, the Eóganacht Raithlind. Tadc initially joined his brother against the Eóganacht, but Donnchad ordered his killing in 1023.

Sigtrygg remained King of Dublin until 1036, and was apparently secure enough to go on pilgrimage to Rome in 1028. However, after Clontarf, Dublin had been reduced to a lesser power. In 1052, Diarmait mac Máel na mBó, King of Leinster, captured Dublin and Fine Gall, for the first time asserting Irish overlordship over the Norse of Ireland.

== Historical debate ==
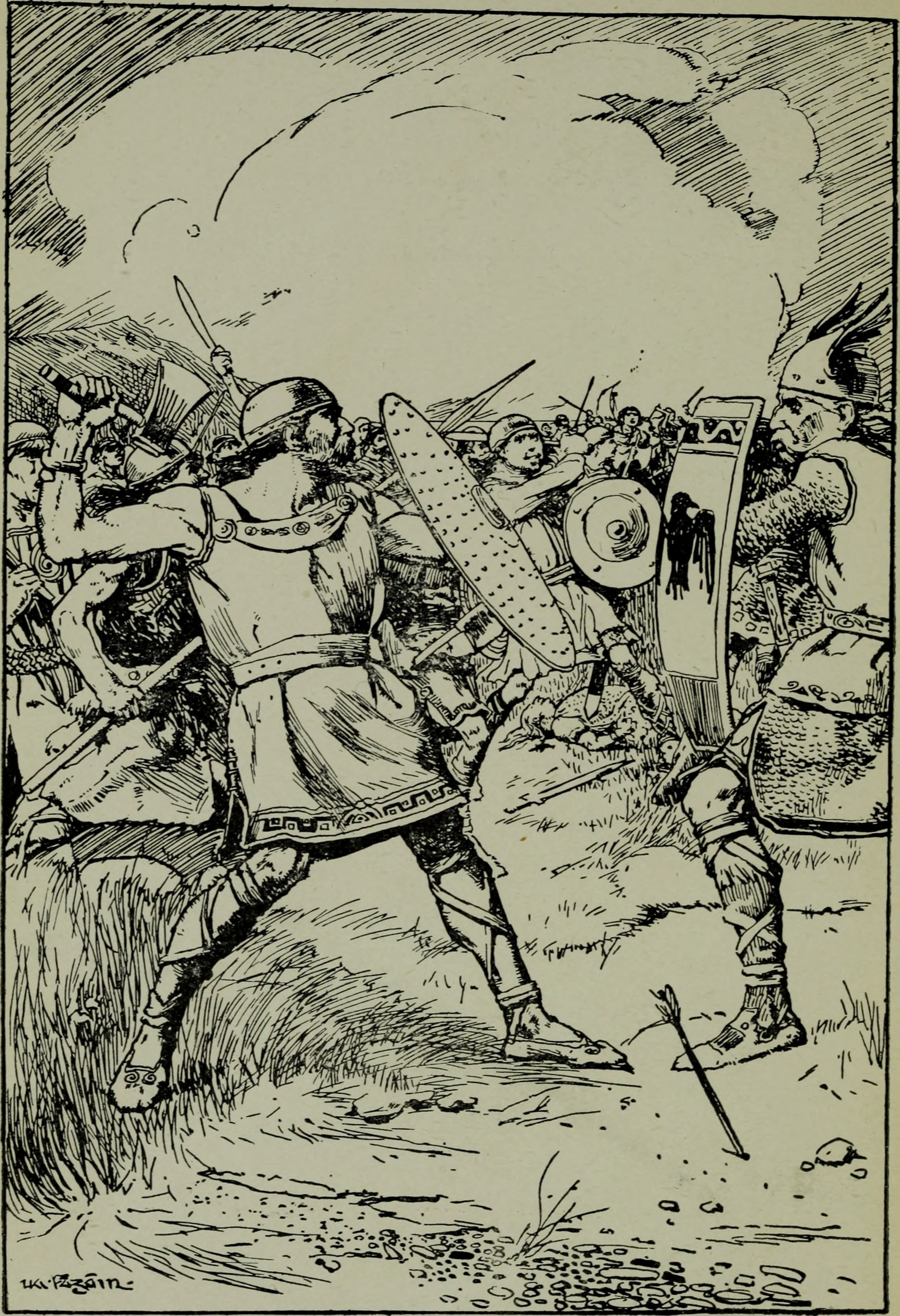
Illustration of the Battle of Clontarf, from a 1905 book

In modern times there has been a long-running debate among historians, which is now 250 years old, about Ireland's Viking age and the Battle of Clontarf. The standard view, and the "popular" view, is that the battle ended a war between the Irish and Vikings by which Brian Boru broke Viking power in Ireland. However revisionist historians see it as an Irish civil war in which Brian Boru's Munster and its allies defeated Leinster and Dublin, and that there were Vikings fighting on both sides. In January 2018, researchers from the Universities of Coventry, Oxford and Sheffield, led by Coventry University theoretical physicist Professor Ralph Kenna, published a paper in the journal Royal Society Open Science, that used network science to mathematically analyse a medieval text, Cogadh Gáedhel re Gallaibh (The War of the Gaedhil with the Gaill, meaning invasions of Ireland by the Danes and other Norsemen), that listed over 1,000 relationships between about 300 characters, and concluded that the standard and popular view was broadly correct, but that the picture was nevertheless more complex than "a fully 'clear-cut' Irish versus Viking conflict". However one of the paper's co-authors, PhD student Joseph Yose, added that "Our statistical analysis ... cannot decisively resolve the debate".

== See also ==
- Battle of Confey
- Battle of Tara
- Brjáns saga
- Njál's saga, which includes a section on the Battle of Clontarf.
