= Indian cricket team in the West Indies in 2017 =

International cricket tour

	West Indies	India
- Dates: 23 June – 9 July 2017
Captains	Jason Holder (ODIs); Carlos Brathwaite (T20I)	Virat Kohli

One Day International series
- Results: India won the 5-match series 3–1
Most runs	Shai Hope (181)	Ajinkya Rahane (336)
Most wickets	Jason Holder (8)	Kuldeep Yadav (8)
- Player of the series: Ajinkya Rahane (Ind)

Twenty20 International series
- Results: West Indies won the 1-match series 1–0
Most runs	Evin Lewis (125)	Dinesh Karthik (48)
Most wickets	Jerome Taylor (2); Kesrick Williams (2)	Kuldeep Yadav (1)

The India cricket team toured the West Indies in June and July 2017 to play five One Day Internationals (ODIs) and a Twenty20 International (T20I) match. India won the ODI series 3–1. The West Indies won the one-off T20I match by 9 wickets.

== Squads ==
ODIs		T20I	
West Indies	India	West Indies	India
Jason Holder (c); Sunil Ambris; Devendra Bishoo; Jonathan Carter; Roston Chase; Miguel Cummins; Kyle Hope; Shai Hope (wk); Alzarri Joseph; Evin Lewis; Jason Mohammed; Ashley Nurse; Kieran Powell; Rovman Powell; Kesrick Williams	Virat Kohli (c); Ravichandran Ashwin; Shikhar Dhawan; MS Dhoni (wk); Ravindra Jadeja; Kedar Jadhav; Dinesh Karthik; Bhuvneshwar Kumar; Hardik Pandya; Rishabh Pant; Ajinkya Rahane; Mohammed Shami; Yuvraj Singh; Kuldeep Yadav; Umesh Yadav	Carlos Brathwaite (c); Samuel Badree; Ronsford Beaton; Chris Gayle; Evin Lewis; Jason Mohammed; Sunil Narine; Kieron Pollard; Rovman Powell; Marlon Samuels; Jerome Taylor; Chadwick Walton (wk); Kesrick Williams	Virat Kohli (c); Ravichandran Ashwin; Shikhar Dhawan; MS Dhoni (wk); Ravindra Jadeja; Kedar Jadhav; Dinesh Karthik; Bhuvneshwar Kumar; Hardik Pandya; Rishabh Pant; Ajinkya Rahane; Mohammed Shami; Yuvraj Singh; Kuldeep Yadav; Umesh Yadav

Sunil Ambris and Kyle Hope replaced Kieran Powell and Jonathan Carter in the West Indies squad for the last three ODIs.

== ODI series ==
=== 1st ODI ===
23 June 2017
Scorecard

India; 199/3 (39.2 overs)	v	West Indies
Shikhar Dhawan 87 (92); Jason Holder 1/34 (8 overs)

No result
Queen's Park Oval, Port of Spain, Trinidad and Tobago
Umpires: Kumar Dharmasena (SL) and Joel Wilson (WI)

- West Indies won the toss and elected to field.
- Rain during India's innings prevented any further play.
- Kuldeep Yadav (Ind) made his ODI debut.

=== 2nd ODI ===
25 June 2017
Scorecard

India; 310/5 (43 overs)	v	West Indies; 205/6 (43 overs)
Ajinkya Rahane 103 (104); Alzarri Joseph 2/73 (8 overs)		Shai Hope 81 (88); Kuldeep Yadav 3/50 (9 overs)

India won by 105 runs
Queen's Park Oval, Port of Spain, Trinidad and Tobago
Umpires: Nigel Duguid (WI) and Chris Gaffaney (NZ)
Player of the match: Ajinkya Rahane (Ind)

- West Indies won the toss and elected to field.
- Rain delayed the start of the match, with the game reduced to 43 overs per side.
- This was India's biggest win against the West Indies on Caribbean soil in terms of runs.

=== 3rd ODI ===
30 June 2017
Scorecard

India; 251/4 (50 overs)	v	West Indies; 158 (38.1 overs)
MS Dhoni 78* (79); Miguel Cummins 2/56 (10 overs)		Jason Mohammed 40 (61); Ravichandran Ashwin 3/28 (10 overs)

India won by 93 runs
Sir Vivian Richards Stadium, Antigua, Antigua and Barbuda
Umpires: Kumar Dharmasena (SL) and Nigel Duguid (WI)
Player of the match: MS Dhoni (Ind)

- West Indies won the toss and elected to field.
- Kyle Hope and Kesrick Williams (WI) both made their ODI debuts.
- Yuvraj Singh (Ind) played his last international match.

=== 4th ODI ===
2 July 2017
Scorecard

West Indies; 189/9 (50 overs)	v	India; 178 (49.4 overs)
Evin Lewis 35 (60); Umesh Yadav 3/36 (10 overs)		Ajinkya Rahane 60 (91); Jason Holder 5/27 (9.4 overs)

West Indies won by 11 runs
Sir Vivian Richards Stadium, Antigua, Antigua and Barbuda
Umpires: Chris Gaffaney (NZ) and Joel Wilson (WI)
Player of the match: Jason Holder (WI)

- West Indies won the toss and elected to bat.
- Jason Holder (WI) took his first five-wicket haul in an ODI.

=== 5th ODI ===
6 July 2017
Scorecard

West Indies; 205/9 (50 overs)	v	India; 206/2 (36.5 overs)
Shai Hope 51 (98); Mohammed Shami 4/48 (10 overs)		Virat Kohli 111* (115); Alzarri Joseph 1/39 (7 overs)

India won by 8 wickets
Sabina Park, Kingston, Jamaica
Umpires: Kumar Dharmasena (SL) and Leslie Reifer (WI)
Player of the match: Virat Kohli (Ind)

- West Indies won the toss and elected to bat.
- Virat Kohli (Ind) scored his 18th ODI century in a run chase, passing the previous record of 17, set by Sachin Tendulkar.

== Only T20I ==
9 July 2017
Scorecard

India; 190/6 (20 overs)	v	West Indies; 194/1 (18.3 overs)
Dinesh Karthik 48 (29); Jerome Taylor 2/31 (4 overs)		Evin Lewis 125* (62); Kuldeep Yadav 1/34 (4 overs)

West Indies won by 9 wickets
Sabina Park, Kingston, Jamaica
Umpires: Nigel Duguid (WI) and Leslie Reifer (WI)
Player of the match: Evin Lewis (WI)

- West Indies won the toss and elected to field.
- Kuldeep Yadav (Ind) made his T20I debut.
- Evin Lewis (WI) made the highest total for the West Indies in a T20I. It was also the highest score in a T20I run chase and the highest against India.
- Evin Lewis also became the first player to score two centuries against the same team in T20Is.
