= Matthew Sonczak =

English cricketer (born 1998)

Personal information
- Full name: Matthew David Sonczak
- Born: 5 September 1998 (age 28); Hadfield, Derbyshire, England
- Batting: Right-handed
- Bowling: Slow left-arm orthodox
- Role: Spin bowler

Domestic team information
- Years: Team
- 2017–2019: Derbyshire (squad no. 69)
- Only First-class: 11 August 2017; Derbyshire v West Indians

Career statistics
Competition	First-class
Matches	1
Runs scored	9
Batting average	9.00
100s/50s	0/0
Top score	9
Balls bowled	210
Wickets	3
Bowling average	38.66
5 wickets in innings	0
10 wickets in match	0
Best bowling	2/56
Catches/stumpings	0/–
- Source: Cricinfo, 29 September 2017

Matthew David Sonczak (born 5 September 1998) is an English cricketer. He made his first-class debut for Derbyshire against the West Indies on 11 August 2017 during their tour of England.
