= 1920 Birthday Honours (New Zealand) =

Awards list for New Zealand

The 1920 King's Birthday Honours in New Zealand, celebrating the official birthday of King George V, were appointments made by the King on the recommendation of the New Zealand government to various orders and honours to reward and highlight good works by New Zealanders. They were announced on 3 June 1920.

The recipients of honours are displayed here as they were styled before their new honour.

== Knight Bachelor ==
- John Roberts CMG – of Dunedin.
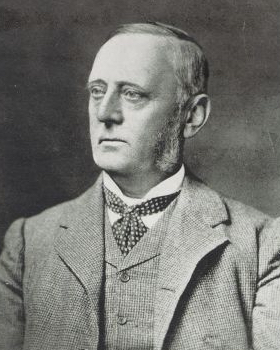
Sir John Roberts

== Companion of the Imperial Service Order (ISO) ==
- Thomas Noel Brodrick OBE – of Wellington; under-secretary of the Lands and Survey Department.
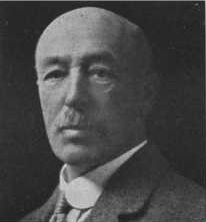
Noel Brodrick
