= Kyle Hope =

West Indian cricketer (born 1988)

Personal information
- Full name: Kyle Antonio Hope
- Born: 20 November 1988 (age 37); Saint Michael Parish, Barbados
- Batting: Right-handed
- Bowling: Right-arm off break
- Role: Batsman
- Relatives: Shai Hope (brother)

International information
- National side: West Indies
- Test debut (cap 312): 17 August 2017 v England
- Last Test: 29 October 2017 v Zimbabwe
- ODI debut (cap 179): 30 June 2017 v India
- Last ODI: 26 December 2017 v New Zealand

Domestic team information
- Years: Team
- 2009/10–2012/13: Barbados
- 2010/11–2014/15: Combined Campuses
- 2015/16–2019/20: Trinidad and Tobago
- 2016: Barbados Tridents
- 2020/21–2022/23: Barbados

Career statistics
Competition	Test	ODI	FC	LA
Matches	5	7	50	46
Runs scored	101	138	2,500	1,185
Batting average	11.22	23.00	29.76	26.93
100s/50s	0/0	0/0	2/15	1/5
Top score	43	46	105*	107
Catches/stumpings	3/–	1/–	43/–	21/–
- Source: ESPNcricinfo, 15 August 2024

Kyle Antonio Hope (born 20 November 1988) is a Barbadian cricketer who has played for both Barbados and Trinidad and Tobago in West Indian domestic cricket, as well as the Combined Campuses and Colleges. He is a right-handed middle-order batsman.

== Career ==
Hope was born in Saint Michael Parish, and attended Queen's College and The Lodge School. He made his first-class debut for Barbados during the 2009–10 Regional Four Day Competition, and made semi-regular appearances over the following three seasons. After a period of poor form, Hope was left without a team for the 2013–14 season, although the following year he appeared for the Combined Campuses in the 2014–15 Regional Super50. He had earlier played for the team in the 2011 and 2012 Caribbean Twenty20 tournaments. For the 2015–16 season, Hope switched to Trinidad and Tobago, returning to first-class cricket for the first time since February 2013. His younger brother, Shai Hope, is also a professional cricketer, and has played international cricket for the West Indies.

In June 2017, he was added to the West Indies One Day International (ODI) squad, ahead of the third match against India. He made his ODI debut for the West Indies against India on 30 June 2017. The following month, he was named in the West Indies squad for the Test series against England. He made his Test debut in the first match of the series on 17 August 2017.

In November 2019, he was named in Trinidad and Tobago's squad for the 2019–20 Regional Super50 tournament. In June 2020, he was selected by Barbados, in the players' draft hosted by Cricket West Indies ahead of the 2020–21 domestic season.
