= Callum Brodrick =

English cricketer (born 1998)

Personal information
- Full name: Callum Ashley J Brodrick
- Born: 24 January 1998 (age 28); Burton upon Trent, Staffordshire, England
- Batting: Right-handed
- Bowling: Right-arm medium
- Role: Batsman

Domestic team information
- Years: Team
- 2017–2018: Derbyshire (squad no. 19)
- First-class debut: 11 August 2017; Derbys v West Indians
- List A debut: 1 June 2018; Derbys v Northamptonshire

Career statistics
Competition	FC	LA	T20
Matches	2	2	6
Runs scored	71	11	40
Batting average	23.66	11.00	10.00
100s/50s	0/1	0/0	0/0
Top score	52	11	14
Catches/stumpings	3/–	2/–	2/–
- Source: Cricinfo, 20 July 2018

Callum Ashley J Brodrick (born 24 January 1998) is an English cricketer. He made his Twenty20 cricket debut for Derbyshire in the 2017 NatWest t20 Blast on 19 July 2017. He made his first-class debut for Derbyshire against the West Indies on 11 August 2017 during their tour of England. He signed a two-year professional contract with Derbyshire in September 2017. He made his List A debut for Derbyshire in the 2018 Royal London One-Day Cup on 1 June 2018.
