= Joan B. Broderick =

Professor of chemistry and biochemistry

Joan Blanchette Broderick
- Citizenship: American
- Education: Northwestern University
- Scientific career
- Workplaces: Texas A&M University Montana State University Michigan State University Amherst College
- Thesis: Spectroscopic and mechanistic studies of chlorocatechol dioxygenase, a non-heme iron dioxygenase with broad substrate tolerance (1992)
- Doctoral advisor: Thomas V. O'Halloran
- Other academic advisors: Joanne Stubbe

Joan Blanchette Broderick is a Professor of chemistry and biochemistry at Texas A&M University known for her work on bioinorganic chemistry, especially the biochemistry of radical SAM enzymes and the role of iron-sulfur clusters in biology. In 2022 she was elected a member of the National Academy of Sciences as well as the American Academy of Arts and Sciences.

== Education and career ==
Broderick received a bachelors degree in chemistry from Washington State University in 1987 working in the laboratories of Tom Okita and Roger Willett. She received a PhD in inorganic chemistry from Northwestern University in 1992 working in the laboratory of Tom O'Halloran as an NSF graduate fellow. Following her Ph.D., Joan was an American Cancer Society postdoctoral research fellow at the Massachusetts Institute of Technology with Joanne Stubbe. Joan joined the faculty at Amherst College in 1993, and moved to Michigan State University in 1998, where she rose to the rank of Associate Professor in 2002 and Full Professor in 2004. In 2005, Joan joined the faculty in the Department of Chemistry and Biochemistry at Montana State University.

Joan has been recognized as a Saltman Lecturer and Women in Science Distinguished Professor at Montana State University. In 2019, Broderick received the Alfred Bader Award in Bioinorganic or Bioorganic Chemistry from the American Chemical Society.

== Research ==
She has contributed to bioinorganic chemistry often with a focus on iron-sulfur proteins, including the radical SAM enzymes. Her research also includes investigations into hydrogenase where she defines the assembly of the enzymes into functional units.

== Awards and Honors ==
- Hagler Fellow, Hagler Institute for Advanced Study, Texas A&M University, 2025-2027
- Witten Lecture, U. North Carolina Chapel Hill, Department of Chemistry, 2025
- Plenary Lecture, International Conference on Bioinorganic Chemistry, 2025
- David Green Lectureship in Enzymology, University of Wisconsin, 2023
- Dawson Lecture, Chemistry Dept., University of Kentucky, 2023
- Ian Scott Medal, Texas A&M Section of the American Chemical Society, 2023
- National Academy of Sciences, Elected Member, 2022
- American Academy of Arts and Sciences, Elected Member, 2022
- Melvin Calvin Lecture, Chemistry Dept, UC-Berkeley, 2021
- AAAS Fellow, 2020
- Alfred Bader Award in Bioinorganic or Bioorganic Chemistry, American Chemical Society, 2019
- Illinois Distinguished Lecturer in Inorganic Chemistry, University of Illinois, 2019
- Montana State University Extraordinary Ordinary Woman, 2018
- James and Mary Ross Award for Excellence, Montana State University 2017
- Women in Science Distinguished Professor, Montana State University 2013-2015
- Charles and Norah L. Wiley Award for Meritorious Research and Creativity, Montana State University 2007
- Paul Saltman Young Investigator Award, Metals in Biology Gordon Research Conference, 2002
- Trustee-Faculty Fellowship, Amherst College 1995
- American Cancer Society Postdoctoral Fellowship 1992-1993
- National Science Foundation Predoctoral Fellowship 1987-1990

== Selected publications ==
- Broderick, Joan B.; Duffus, Benjamin R.; Duschene, Kaitlin S.; Shepard, Eric M. (23 April 2014). "Radical S -Adenosylmethionine Enzymes". Chemical Reviews. 114 (8): 4229–4317. doi:10.1021/cr4004709. PMC 4002137. PMID 24476342.
- Horitani, Masaki; Shisler, Krista; Broderick, William E.; Hutcheson, Rachel U.; Duschene, Kaitlin S.; Marts, Amy R.; Hoffman, Brian M.; Broderick, Joan B. (2016-05-13). "Radical SAM catalysis via an organometallic intermediate with an Fe–[5′-C]-deoxyadenosyl bond". Science. 352(6287): 822–825. doi:10.1126/science.aaf5327. ISSN 0036-8075. PMC 4929858. PMID 27174986.
- Mulder, David W.; Boyd, Eric S.; Sarma, Ranjana; Lange, Rachel K.; Endrizzi, James A.; Broderick, Joan B.; Peters, John W. (May 2010). "Stepwise [FeFe]-hydrogenase H-cluster assembly revealed in the structure of HydAΔEFG". Nature. 465 (7295): 248–251. Bibcode:2010Natur.465..248M. doi:10.1038/nature08993. PMID 20418861. S2CID 1990191.
- Peters, John W.; Schut, Gerrit J.; Boyd, Eric S.; Mulder, David W.; Shepard, Eric M.; Broderick, Joan B.; King, Paul W.; Adams, Michael W. W. (1 June 2015). "[FeFe]- and [NiFe]-hydrogenase diversity, mechanism, and maturation". Biochimica et Biophysica Acta (BBA) - Molecular Cell Research. 1853 (6): 1350–1369. doi:10.1016/j.bbamcr.2014.11.021. ISSN 0167-4889. PMID 25461840.
