= Patricia A. Broderick =

American judge (1949–2025)

Senior Judge of the Superior Court of the District of Columbia
- In office June 5, 2020 – June 17, 2025

Associate Judge of the Superior Court of the District of Columbia
- In office November 3, 1998 – June 5, 2020
- President: Bill Clinton
- Preceded by: Harriett Rosen Taylor
- Succeeded by: Rupa Ranga Puttagunta

Personal details
- Born: November 30, 1949 New York City, U.S.
- Died: June 17, 2025 (aged 75) Washington, D.C., U.S.
- Education: Trinity College (BA); George Washington University (MS); Columbus School of Law (JD)

Patricia A. Broderick (November 30, 1949 – June 17, 2025) was an American associate judge of the Superior Court of the District of Columbia.

== Life and career ==
Broderick was born in New York City and grew up in New Jersey. She earned her Bachelor of Arts from Trinity College, her master's degree from George Washington University and her Juris Doctor from Columbus School of Law in 1981. An automobile accident in Pennsylvania in 1970 left Broderick paralyzed from the chest down. She traveled widely, visiting 66 countries, used an adaptive monoski, and spoke publicly for the rights of the disabled.

After graduating, she served as a law clerk for Henry F. Greene on the D.C. Superior Court. She served as an Assistant U.S. Attorney before moving to the U.S. Department of Justice's money laundering section.

=== D.C. Superior Court ===
On February 11, 1997, President Bill Clinton nominated Broderick to a fifteen-year term as an associate judge on the Superior Court of the District of Columbia to the seat vacated by Harriett Rosen Taylor. On September 3, 1998, the Senate Committee on Governmental Affairs held a hearing on her nomination. On September 24, 1998, the Committee reported her nomination favorably to the senate floor. On October 28, 1998, the full Senate confirmed her nomination by voice vote.

On August 30, 2013, the Commission on Judicial Disabilities and Tenure recommended that President Obama reappoint her to second fifteen-year term as a judge on the D.C. Superior Court. She assumed senior status in 2020.

=== Death ===
Broderick died on June 17, 2025, at the age of 75. She died at a care facility in Washington, D.C., having experienced respiratory infections complicated by pulmonary weakness that stemmed from her paralysis.
