= West Indian cricket team in England in 2017 =

International cricket tour

	England	West Indies
- Dates: 1 August – 29 September 2017
Captains	Joe Root (Tests); Eoin Morgan (ODIs and T20I)	Jason Holder (Tests and ODIs) (Note: Jason Mohammed captained the West Indies for the 5th ODI, after Jason Holder returned home to attend a funeral.); Carlos Brathwaite (T20I)

Test series
- Result: England won the 3-match series 2–1
Most runs	Alastair Cook (304)	Shai Hope (375)
Most wickets	James Anderson (19)	Kemar Roach (11)
- Player of the series: James Anderson (Eng) and Shai Hope (WI)

One Day International series
- Results: England won the 5-match series 4–0
Most runs	Jonny Bairstow (302)	Evin Lewis (200)
Most wickets	Liam Plunkett (8)	Alzarri Joseph (5)
- Player of the series: Moeen Ali (Eng)

Twenty20 International series
- Results: West Indies won the 1-match series 1–0
Most runs	Alex Hales (43)	Evin Lewis (51)
Most wickets	Liam Plunkett (3); Adil Rashid (3)	Carlos Brathwaite (3); Kesrick Williams (3)

The West Indies cricket team toured England in August and September 2017 to play three Test matches competing for the Wisden Trophy, one Twenty20 International (T20I) and five One Day Internationals (ODIs).

Ahead of the Test series, the West Indies played first-class warm-up matches against Derbyshire, Essex and Kent. They also played a two-day match against Leicestershire, as they did not get to the final of the 2017 NatWest t20 Blast.

In October 2016 the England and Wales Cricket Board (ECB) confirmed that the first Test at Edgbaston would be played as a day/night game. Tom Harrison, chief executive of the ECB, said that "we are excited by the prospect of staging our first ever day-night Test match". Following the Edgbaston Test match, both England's Alastair Cook and Neil Snowball, CEO of Warwickshire County Cricket Club, said that the "jury is out" with regard to holding another day/night Test in England. The ECB considered it a success, with the possibility of having a day/night Test as an annual fixture. England won the Test series 2–1, with James Anderson taking his 500th wicket in the third match.

The West Indies won the one-off T20I match at the Riverside Ground by 21 runs. In the opening ODI match, England won by 7 wickets, meaning that the West Indies would need to play in the 2018 Cricket World Cup Qualifier tournament, as they were not able to qualify directly for the 2019 Cricket World Cup. England's preparation for the fourth ODI was disrupted following the arrest of Ben Stokes in Bristol after the third ODI. Following the incident, both Stokes and Alex Hales were suspended by the ECB, meaning they would not be considered for selection for England until further notice. Despite this, England went on to win the ODI series 4–0.

== Squads ==
Tests		ODIs		T20Is	
England	West Indies	England	West Indies	England	West Indies
Joe Root (c); Ben Stokes (vc); Jonny Bairstow (wk); Alastair Cook; James Anderson; Stuart Broad; Dawid Malan; Mark Stoneman; Moeen Ali; Toby Roland-Jones; Mason Crane; Chris Woakes; Tom Westley	Jason Holder (c); Kraigg Brathwaite (vc); Devendra Bishoo; Jermaine Blackwood; Roston Chase; Miguel Cummins; Shane Dowrich (wk); Shannon Gabriel; Shimron Hetmyer; Kyle Hope; Shai Hope (wk); Alzarri Joseph; Kieran Powell; Raymon Reifer; Kemar Roach	Eoin Morgan (c); Jos Buttler (wk); Jonny Bairstow; Jake Ball; Sam Billings; Moeen Ali; Tom Curran; Alex Hales; Dawid Malan; Liam Plunkett; Joe Root; Ben Stokes; Jason Roy; Adil Rashid; David Willey; Chris Woakes	Jason Holder (c); Sunil Ambris; Devendra Bishoo; Carlos Brathwaite; Miguel Cummins; Chris Gayle; Kyle Hope; Shai Hope (wk); Alzarri Joseph; Evin Lewis; Jason Mohammed; Ashley Nurse; Rovman Powell; Marlon Samuels; Jerome Taylor; Kesrick Williams	Eoin Morgan (c); Jonny Bairstow; Jos Buttler (wk); Jake Ball; Tom Curran; Liam Dawson; Alex Hales; David Willey; Dawid Malan; Liam Plunkett; Joe Root; Jason Roy; Adil Rashid; Chris Jordan	Carlos Brathwaite (c); Ronsford Beaton; Chris Gayle; Evin Lewis; Jason Mohammed; Sunil Narine; Ashley Nurse; Kieron Pollard; Rovman Powell; Marlon Samuels; Jerome Taylor; Chadwick Walton (wk); Kesrick Williams

Sam Billings was added to the England squad ahead of the fourth ODI, and Dawid Malan before the fifth, following the arrest of Ben Stokes and his and Alex Hales's subsequent suspension. Carlos Brathwaite was added to the West Indies' squad for the fifth ODI as a replacement for Jason Holder who went home to attend a funeral. Jason Mohammed was made captain for the match in Holder's absence.

== Tour matches ==
=== First-class: Essex vs West Indies ===
1–3 August 2017
Scorecard

West Indies	v	Essex
338/8d (100 overs); Roston Chase 81 (138); Callum Taylor 2/44 (12 overs)		185/9d (61.5 overs); Paul Walter 68* (139); Kemar Roach 5/43 (18 overs)
135/4d (31 overs); Roston Chase 50 (80); Paul Walter 2/14 (3 overs)

Match drawn
County Cricket Ground, Chelmsford
Umpires: Nigel Cowley (Eng) and Tom Lungley (Eng)

- Essex won the toss and elected to field.
- Rain in the lunch interval prevented any further play on day 2.

=== First-class: Kent vs West Indies ===
6–8 August 2017
Scorecard

West Indies	v	Kent
265 (83.4 overs); Shai Hope 57 (121); Charlie Hartley 4/80 (17.4 overs)		331/9d (93.2 overs); Sean Dickson 142 (210); Alzarri Joseph 4/72 (22 overs)
132/4 (36.4 overs); Shimron Hetmyer 43* (39); Charlie Hartley 2/44 (11.4 overs)

Match drawn
St Lawrence Ground, Canterbury
Umpires: James Middlebrook (Eng) and Alex Wharf (Eng)

- West Indies won the toss and elected to bat.
- Zak Crawley (Kent) made his first-class debut.

=== First-class: Derbyshire vs West Indies ===
11–13 August 2017 (D/N)
Scorecard

West Indies	v	Derbyshire
427/3d (100 overs); Roston Chase 110* (113); Matthew Sonczak 1/60 (16 overs)		181 (51.3 overs); Callum Brodrick 52 (91); Jason Holder 3/48 (13 overs)
327/6d (85 overs); Kieran Powell 100 (103); Matthew Sonczak 2/56 (19 overs)		51/0 (14 overs); Ben Slater 27* (47)

Match drawn
County Cricket Ground, Derby
Umpires: Ben Debenham (Eng) and Russell Evans (Eng)

- West Indies won the toss and elected to bat.
- Callum Brodrick, Matthew Sonczak and James Taylor (Derbyshire) all made their first-class debuts.

=== Two-day: Leicestershire vs West Indies ===
2–3 September 2017
Scorecard

West Indies	v	Leicestershire
377/7d (88 overs); Shimron Hetmyer 128* (120); Dieter Klein 3/77 (19 overs)		70/1 (12.1 overs); Harry Dearden 42* (45); Alzarri Joseph 1/14 (2.1 overs)

Match drawn
Grace Road, Leicestershire
Umpires: Paul Baldwin (Eng) and Chris Watts (Eng)

- West Indies won the toss and elected to bat.
- No further play was possible after lunch on day 2.

== Test series ==
=== 1st Test ===
17–21 August 2017 (Note: While five days of play were scheduled for each Test, the first and third Tests reached a result within three days.) (D/N)
Scorecard

England	v	West Indies
514/8d (135.5 overs); Alastair Cook 243 (407); Roston Chase 4/113 (26.2 overs)		168 (47 overs); Jermaine Blackwood 79* (76); James Anderson 3/34 (15 overs)
		137 (45.4 overs) (f/o); Kraigg Brathwaite 40 (76); Stuart Broad 3/34 (10 overs)

England won by an innings and 209 runs
Edgbaston, Birmingham
Umpires: Marais Erasmus (SA) and Sundaram Ravi (Ind)
Player of the match: Alastair Cook (Eng)

- England won the toss and elected to bat.
- Mark Stoneman (Eng) and Kyle Hope (WI) made their Test debuts.
- This was the first day/night Test match in England.
- The West Indies lost 19 wickets on day 3, the most they had lost in a single day in Tests.
- With the wicket of Shane Dowrich in the West Indies' second innings, Stuart Broad surpassed Sir Ian Botham as England's second highest wicket-taker in Tests with 384.

=== 2nd Test ===
25–29 August 2017
Scorecard

England	v	West Indies
258 (70.5 overs); Ben Stokes 100 (124); Shannon Gabriel 4/51 (17 overs)		427 (127 overs); Shai Hope 147 (253); James Anderson 5/76 (29 overs)
490/8d (141 overs); Moeen Ali 84 (93); Roston Chase 3/86 (32 overs)		322/5 (91.2 overs); Shai Hope 118* (211); Chris Woakes 1/38 (11 overs)

West Indies won by 5 wickets
Headingley, Leeds
Umpires: Chris Gaffaney (NZ) and Sundaram Ravi (Ind)
Player of the match: Shai Hope (WI)

- England won the toss and elected to bat.
- Joe Root (Eng) equalled AB de Villiers' record of 12 consecutive Tests scoring a half-century.
- England's 490 for 8 declared is their highest total in Test cricket without any of their batsman making a century.
- Shai Hope (WI) scored his first century in Tests.
- Shai Hope's two centuries in the match marked the first time this feat had been achieved at this venue in first-class cricket.
- This was the West Indies' first Test win in England since 2000.

=== 3rd Test ===
7–11 September 2017
Scorecard

West Indies	v	England
123 (57.3 overs); Kieran Powell 39 (98); Ben Stokes 6/22 (14.3 overs)		194 (52.5 overs); Ben Stokes 60 (74); Kemar Roach 5/72 (24 overs)
177 (65.1 overs); Shai Hope 62 (144); James Anderson 7/42 (20.1 overs)		107/1 (28 overs); Tom Westley 44* (72); Devendra Bishoo 1/35 (11 overs)

England won by 9 wickets
Lord's, London
Umpires: Marais Erasmus (SA) and Chris Gaffaney (NZ)
Player of the match: Ben Stokes (Eng)

- West Indies won the toss and elected to bat.
- 11 overs of play were lost on day 1 due to rain and bad light and 25 overs were lost on day 2 due to a wet outfield.
- James Anderson (Eng) became the first bowler for England, and sixth bowler overall, to take 500 wickets in Tests.

== T20I series ==
=== Only T20I ===
16 September 2017
18:30 (D/N)
Scorecard

West Indies; 176/9 (20 overs)	v	England; 155 (19.3 overs)
Evin Lewis 51 (28); Adil Rashid 3/25 (4 overs)		Alex Hales 43 (17); Carlos Brathwaite 3/20 (3.3 overs)

West Indies won by 21 runs
Riverside Ground, Chester-le-Street
Umpires: Michael Gough (Eng) and Tim Robinson (Eng)
Player of the match: Sunil Narine (WI)

- England won the toss and elected to field.
- Chris Gayle (WI) became the first player to hit 100 sixes in T20Is.

== ODI series ==
=== 1st ODI ===
19 September 2017
12:30 (D/N)
Scorecard

West Indies; 204/9 (42 overs)	v	England; 210/3 (30.5 overs)
Jason Holder 41* (33); Ben Stokes 3/43 (9 overs)		Jonny Bairstow 100* (97); Kesrick Williams 2/50 (6 overs)

England won by 7 wickets
Old Trafford, Manchester
Umpires: Simon Fry (Aus) and Tim Robinson (Eng)
Player of the match: Jonny Bairstow (Eng)

- West Indies won the toss and elected to bat.
- The match was reduced to 42 overs per side due to a wet outfield.
- Jonny Bairstow (Eng) scored his first century in ODIs.

=== 2nd ODI ===
21 September 2017
12:30 (D/N)
Scorecard

England; 21/0 (2.2 overs)	v	West Indies
Alex Hales 10* (7)

No result
Trent Bridge, Nottingham
Umpires: Rob Bailey (Eng) and Rod Tucker (Aus)

- West Indies won the toss and elected to field.
- Rain stopped the match in England's innings and no further play was possible.

=== 3rd ODI ===
24 September 2017
11:00
Scorecard

England; 369/9 (50 overs)	v	West Indies; 245 (39.1 overs)
Moeen Ali 102 (57); Miguel Cummins 3/82 (9 overs)		Chris Gayle 94 (78); Liam Plunkett 5/52 (8.1 overs)

England won by 124 runs
County Ground, Bristol
Umpires: Simon Fry (Aus) and Michael Gough (Eng)
Player of the match: Moeen Ali (Eng)

- West Indies won the toss and elected to field.
- Moeen Ali (Eng) scored the fastest century in England, and the second-fastest by an England batsman in ODIs (53 balls).
- Liam Plunkett (Eng) took his first five-wicket haul in ODIs.
- This match set a new record for the most number of sixes scored in an ODI in England (28).

=== 4th ODI ===
27 September 2017
12:30 (D/N)
Scorecard

West Indies; 356/5 (50 overs)	v	England; 258/5 (35.1 overs)
Evin Lewis 176* (130); Chris Woakes 3/71 (10 overs)		Jason Roy 84 (66); Alzarri Joseph 5/56 (8.1 overs)

England won by 6 runs (DLS method)
The Oval, London
Umpires: Rob Bailey (Eng) and Rod Tucker (Aus)
Player of the match: Evin Lewis (WI)

- England won the toss and elected to field.
- Alzarri Joseph (WI) took his first five-wicket haul in ODIs.
- The West Indies' total of 356/5 was their highest total against England in ODIs and their fourth highest overall.

=== 5th ODI ===
29 September 2017
12:30 (D/N)
Scorecard

West Indies; 288/6 (50 overs)	v	England; 294/1 (38 overs)
Shai Hope 72 (95); Liam Plunkett 2/54 (10 overs)		Jonny Bairstow 141* (114); Miguel Cummins 1/70 (8 overs)

England won by 9 wickets
Rose Bowl, Southampton
Umpires: Simon Fry (Aus) and Michael Gough (Eng)
Player of the match: Jonny Bairstow (Eng)

- England won the toss and elected to field.
- Tom Curran (Eng) and Sunil Ambris (WI) made their ODI debuts.
- Jason Mohammed (WI) captained the West Indies for the first time in ODIs.
- Jonny Bairstow's unbeaten 141 is the highest score by an England batsman against the West Indies in ODIs, beating the previous best of 130 made by Marcus Trescothick in 2004.
- Joe Root (Eng) became the third-fastest batsman, in terms of number of innings, to score 4,000 runs in ODIs (91).
