= Mount Broderick =

Summit in Yosemite National Park

Coordinates: 37°44′01″N 119°32′07″W

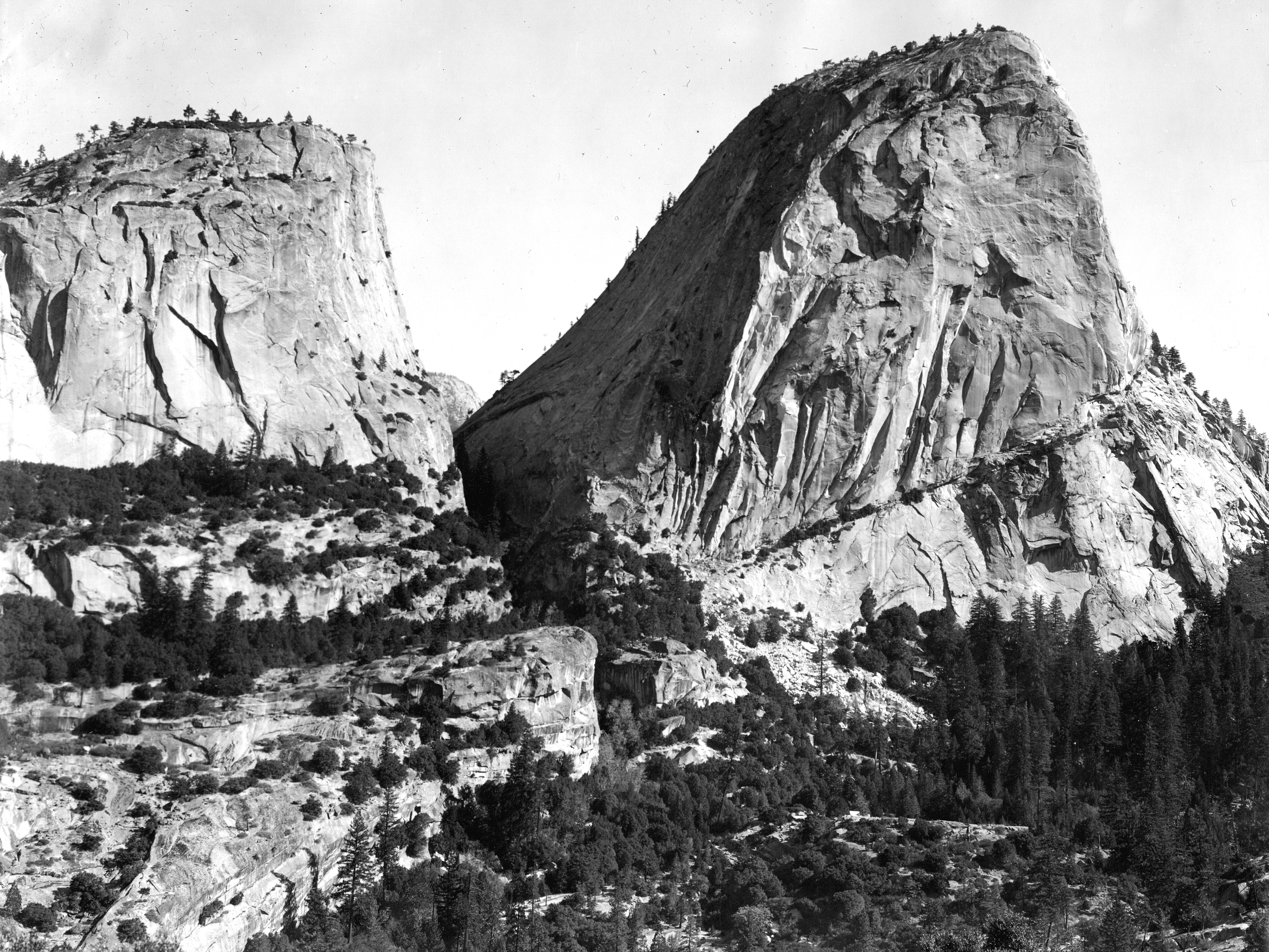
- Mount Broderick on the left, Liberty Cap on the right

Highest point
- Elevation: 6,706 ft (2,044 m)
- Prominence: 466 feet (142 m)
- Parent peak: Half Dome

Geography
- Location within California Location within the United States
- Location: Yosemite National Park

Mount Broderick is a summit in Yosemite National Park, United States. With an elevation of 6,696 feet (2,041 m), Mount Broderick is the 1573rd highest summit in the state of California.

Mount Broderick was named for David C. Broderick, a United States Senator from California.

There are rock climbing routes on Mount Broderick.

Climbing Mount Broderick requires a wilderness permit, obtainable at all Yosemite visitor centers.

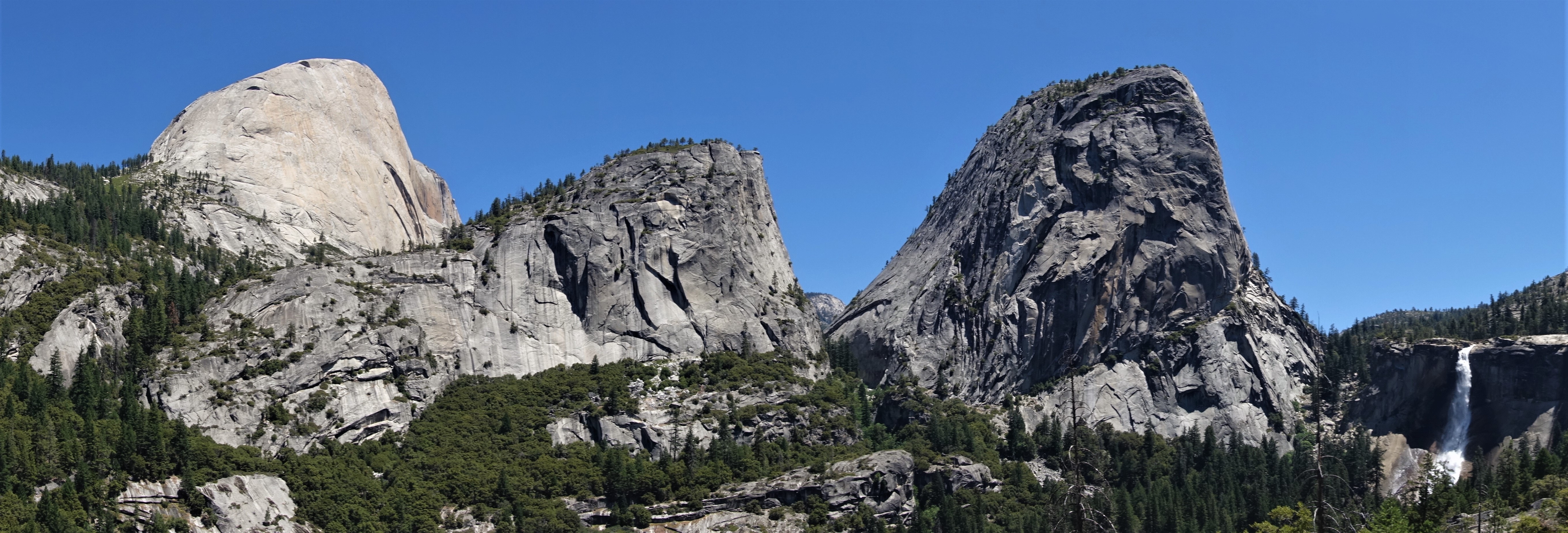
Left to rightː Half Dome, Mount Broderick, Liberty Cap, Nevada Fall. From the southwest at Clark Point.
