= Dorothy M. Broderick =

American librarian

- Born: June 23, 1929; Bridgeport, Connecticut, U.S.
- Died: December 17, 2011 (age 82); Patchogue, New York, U.S.
- Occupations: Writer, librarian, college professor

Dorothy M. Broderick (June 23, 1929 – December 17, 2011) was an American writer, college professor, editor, and "a legend of YA librarianship". She was co-founder and editor of VOYA: Voice of Youth Advocates, a professional magazine for librarians concerned with services for children and youth.

== Early life and education ==
Broderick was born in Bridgeport, Connecticut, the daughter of Mary L. Broderick. She graduated from New Haven State Teachers College in 1953, and earned a master's in library science (MLS) from Columbia University in 1956. She completed a doctorate in library science (DLS) in 1971. Her dissertation advisor was Frances E. Henne.

== Career ==
Broderick was a librarian in Milford, Connecticut, and Hicksville, New York, as a young woman, and at Western Reserve University and the University of Wisconsin after she earned her DLS. She was the children's library consultant for the New York State Library. She taught children's literature at Dalhousie University beginning in 1972. In 1977, she organized the first science fiction fan convention in Nova Scotia.

Broderick was an active member of the American Library Association and of YALSA. Broderick spoke and wrote often on censorship issues, and on the evolving nature of public libraries, especially for younger patrons. "It is not enough just to have beautiful buildings," she said in her keynote address to the annual conference of the Arizona State Library Association in 1967.

Learning of her death, Cathi Dunn MacRae, editor of Voice of Youth Advocates wrote: "Dorothy's fierce, sassy voice injected us with the courage to live as the framers of the First Amendment intended. In our libraries, we enabled teenagers to explore any idea or topic as they defined their own beliefs. While defending parents' right to guide their own children's reading and activities, we explained why no one can withhold free library access from others."

== Publications ==
=== Scholarship ===
In addition to her books, and articles in scholarly journals such as The Bookmark, Leisure, Instructor, Drexel Library Quarterly, School Library Media Annual, and Publishing Research Quarterly, Broderick frequently wrote short opinion items for American Libraries, School Library Journal, Wilson Library Bulletin, Collection Building, The Phi Delta Kappan, and Library Journal. She was co-founder and editor of VOYA: Voice of Youth Advocates, a professional magazine. Her more distinctive writings were published as part of a posthumous festschrift edited by Anthony Bernier, The Collected Wit and Wisdom of Dorothy M. Broderick (2013).

- "On Quality Books for Children" (1961)
- An Introduction to Children's Work in Public Libraries (1965)
- "I May, I Might, I Must" and "Problem Nonfiction" Brid (1969)
- "When the Censor Knocks..." (1971)
- Image of the Black in Children's Fiction (1972, based on her dissertation)
- Library Work with Children (1977)
- "Intellectual Freedom and Young Adults" (1978)
- Censorship, a Family Affair? (1979)
- "Adolescent Development and Censorship" (1983)
- "Focus on Youth: The Nonperson Gap in Public Library Collections" (1983)
- Building Library Collections (1985, with Arthur Curley)
- Broderick, Dorothy M., ed. (1990). The VOYA Reader. Vol. 1. Metuchen, NJ: Scarecrow Press. ISBN 978-0-8108-2331-0.
- "Reviewing Young Adult Books: The VOYA Editor Speaks Out" (1992)
- "Moral Conflict and the Survival of the Public Library" (1993)
- "Turning Library into a Dirty Word: A Rant" (1997)
- Serious about series: evaluations and annotations of teen fiction in paperback series (1998, edited with S. Makowski)
- The VOYA Reader 2 (1998, edited with Mary K. Chelton)

=== Books for younger readers ===
- Leete's Island Adventure (1962)
- Hank (1966)
- Training a Companion Dog (1967, illustrated by Haris Petie)
- Time for Stories of the Past and Present (1968, with May Hill Arbuthnot, illustrated by Rainey Bennett)
- Time for Biography (1969, with May Hill Arbuthnot)

== Awards ==
- Robert B. Downs Intellectual Freedom Award (1986)
- Freedom to Read Foundation's Roll of Honor (1998)

== Personal life ==
Broderick toured North America in a travel trailer with her dog Heidi in the early 1970s. She lived with her partner, fellow librarian and VOYA cofounder Mary K. Chelton. Broderick died in 2011, at the age of 82, in Patchogue, New York, where Chelton remained until her death in 2025. Her typescript and proof for Hank are in the archives of the University of Minnesota Libraries.
