= Broderick (disambiguation) =

Broderick is a surname and given name.

Broderick may also refer to:

== Places ==
- Broderick, California, a former town in California
- Broderick Park, a municipal park in Buffalo, New York
- Broderick County, Kansas Territory, a county from 1859 to 1861 in the present US state of Kansas
- Broderick, Saskatchewan, a village in Canada
- Broderick Reservoir, a reservoir in Saskatchewan, Canada
- Broderick Falls, Kenya
- Mount Broderick, a mountain in California

== Others ==
- 18766 Broderick, an asteroid
