= Voice of Youth Advocates =

American trade magazine for librarians

- Categories: Libraries, Librarianship, Library science
- Frequency: Bimonthly
- Circulation: 6,000
- Founded: 1978
- Company: E L Kurdyla Publishing LLC
- Country: United States
- Language: English
- ISSN: 0160-4201
- OCLC: 61314081

Voice of Youth Advocates (VOYA) was a bimonthly magazine that provided book reviews and information for librarians with a focus on young adult materials.

== History and profile ==
VOYA was established in 1978. The founders were Dorothy M. Broderick and Mary K. Chelton. In an assessment of the early years of the journal Chelton noted, "it needed to be done to prove a point about the vibrancy and diversity of YA services and the important differences between child and adolescent development."

The magazine included reviews of young adult and children's literature. It also contributed to the awards, grants and scholarships program of the American Library Association.

A 25 year retrospective was written by Cathi Dunn MacRae in 2002.

In 2010 the magazine was acquired by Kurdyla from Scarecrow Press

In 2018, the fortieth anniversary of VOYA, Jane Van Wiemokly characterized forty years of reviewing for the journal and Diane P. Ticcillo noted that it was an essential publication and a guiding light through her long career working with teens and libraries.
