= Judge Broderick =

Judge Broderick may refer to:

- Raymond J. Broderick (1914–2000), judge of the United States District Court for the Eastern District of Pennsylvania
- Vernon S. Broderick (born 1963), judge of the United States District Court for the Southern District of New York
- Vincent L. Broderick (1920–1995), judge of the United States District Court for the Southern District of New York
