= Noel Brodrick =

New Zealand surveyor and public servant (1855–1931)

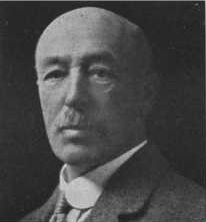
Noel Brodrick

Thomas Noel Brodrick OBE ISO (25 December 1855 – 12 July 1931) was a New Zealand surveyor and public servant, serving as Surveyor-General of New Zealand from April to October 1920.

Brodrick was born in Islington, London, England, on 25 December 1855 and arrived in New Zealand aboard the Nimroud in 1860. Brodrick was appointed district surveyor in 1888 and transferred to Timaru. Brodrick surveyed the mountain boundaries of many pastoral runs, whose Crown land leases were expiring. This involved a topographical survey and triangulation of most of the eastern side of the Southern Alps, from Rangitata River in the north to the Hunter River in the south.

Brodrick was appointed an Officer of the Order of the British Empire in the 1919 King's Birthday Honours, and a Companion of the Imperial Service Order in the 1920 King's Birthday Honours.

Brodrick is the namesake of Brodrick Peak, a mountain in the Southern Alps.
