= Vincent Broderick =

Vincent Broderick may refer to:

- Vince Broderick (1920–2010), English cricketer
- Vincent Broderick (musician) (1920–2008), Irish musician and composer
- Vincent L. Broderick (1920–1995), American federal judge
