= Brodir and Ospak of Man =

Danish soldiers

Bróðir and Óspak of Man were two Danish or Norwegian brothers who were active in the Isle of Man and Ireland in the 11th century. They are mentioned in the 12th century Irish Cogadh Gaedhil re Gallaibh and the 13th century Icelandic Njal's Saga as the key leaders who fought on opposite sides in the Battle of Clontarf, in 1014. The latter account names Bróðir as the killer of Brian Boru, the High King of Ireland. Both Boru and Bróðir died in the battle, although accounts differ as to who killed whom. Óspak fought on the side of Boru, was injured, and lost his two sons in the battle.

== Life ==
Bróðir (also Brodir or Brodar or anglicised as Broderick) and Óspak (also Óspakur, Ospakr or Ospak) were two Danish brothers who lived on the west coast of the Isle of Man. According to Njál's saga, Óspak was a heathen, described as "the wisest of all men." Bróðir had been "a Christian man and a mass-deacon by consecration", but he had apostatised and become "of all men most skilled in sorcery." Bróðir was tall and strong, with long black hair that he wore tucked in under his belt, and he was clad in a coat of mail "which no steel could bite." Between them, they had thirty ships, and were described by Gormflaith as "men of such hardihood that nothing can withstand them".

=== From the Isle of Man to Ireland ===
Hún sagði að víkingar tveir lágu úti fyrir vestan Mön og höfðu þrjá tigu skipa " … og svo harðfengir að ekki stendur við. Heitir annar Óspakur en annar Bróðir. Þú skalt fara til móts við þá og lát ekki að skorta að koma þeim í með þér hvað sem þeir mæla til."

She said there were two Vikings lying off the west of Man; and that they had thirty ships, and, she went on, " … Thou shalt fare to find them, and spare nothing to get them into thy quarrel, whatever price they ask."

Njál's saga, 13th century

Some time in the 1010s, Brian Boru divorced his second wife, the three-times-married Hiberno-Norse Queen Gormflaith, and she began engineering opposition to the High King. Around 1012, relations between Brian and Leinster had become so strained that revolt broke out among the Leinstermen. Gormflaith sent her son, the King of Dublin, Sigtrygg Silkbeard, to win first the support of Earl Sigurd of Orkney, and then of Bróðir and Óspak, at any price. Sigtrygg went to Man, where he persuaded Bróðir to come to Dublin by Palm Sunday. Sigtrygg promised both Sigurd and Bróðir separately that, if successful, they would be allowed marry Gormflaith and become High King of Ireland; the terms of this agreement, however, were to be kept secret. Óspak was dissatisfied with the arrangement, and refused to "fight against so good a king".

The events leading up to the Battle of Clontarf became part of a heroic tale in subsequent tradition, both Irish and Norse, and evil portents were recorded throughout the Norse world. According to Njál's Saga, one night a great din passed over Bróðir and his men on the Isle of Man, so that they all sprang up from sleep and dressed themselves. Until dawn, this din was accompanied by a shower of boiling blood, which scalded many of them even though they covered themselves with their shields. As a result, "a man had died on board every ship." On the second night, they awoke to a ghostly assault on their ships by flying swords, axes and spears. Again, this lasted till dawn, and a man died on every ship. On the third night, they were attacked by ravens with iron beaks and claws, once again causing a death in every ship.

Bróðir consulted his brother Óspak, who believed that the signs indicated that much blood would be shed on both sides, that Bróðir's would all die speedily, that there would be a battle, and all his men would be dragged "down to the pains of hell." Bróðir was so angered by this that he planned to slay Óspak's men the next day. Seeing this plan, Óspak deserted his brother during the night with ten ships. He sailed around Ireland to Connaught, and up the River Shannon, to join Brian Boru as an ally. He told King Brian all that he had learned, took baptism, and gathered his men to come to Dublin with Brian's forces a week before Palm Sunday.

=== Battle of Clontarf ===
According to Njal's saga, Bróðir tried by sorcery to predict the outcome of the battle against Brian. He augured that if the battle were on Good Friday, King Brian would fall but win the battle; but if they fought on any day before, all who opposed Brian would be killed. Brian was unwilling to fight on Good Friday, as he would not fight on a fast day, but the Danes forced the battle to the Friday, which fell that year on 23 April.

Thus, the two brothers, Bróðir and Óspak, met again at the Battle of Clontarf, on diagonally opposite wings. Bróðir had brought with him 1000 mail-clad Norsemen, and led the "murderous foreign Danes" alongside Earl Sigurd of Orkney. On the wing directly opposite Bróðir was Wolf the Quarrelsome, one of Brian's followers. Bróðir drove deep into the opposite wing, "and felled all the foremost that stood there", as his mail protected him from swordblows. When Wolf turned to meet him, however, he "thrust at him thrice so hard that Bróðir fell before him at each thrust", and Bróðir "fled away into the wood at once." The two sides were very evenly matched, and the battle raged all day, from high tide at sunrise to sunset. However, Bróðir's absence reduced the morale of his men, and the Manx Vikings began to flee back to their ships after they were broken by the personal bodyguard of Murchad, the son of Brian, ending in an eventual victory for Brian's allies.

Meanwhile, Brian, now in his seventies, had been advised to await the outcome of the battle in a tent not far from the field, and it is said that a traitor in the Irish camp, possibly Tadhg O Ceallaigh, King of Uí Maine, had pointed out Brian's position to Bróðir at some point during the battle. Accounts differ over whether Bróðir was the killer of Brian Boru. According to one Irish account, Bróðir overcame Brian's guard, only to be killed by the High King who then killed himself. Njal's saga records that Bróðir killed Brian and cried out: "Now let man tell man that Brodir felled Brian." Two of Brian's followers, Wolf and Kerthialfad, returned to the king, and captured Bróðir and the remainder of his men. According to the saga, "Wolf the Quarrelsome cut open his belly, and led him round and round the trunk of a tree, and so wound all his entrails out of him," while Bróðir's men were "slain to a man". The modern Irish medievalist historian Donnchadh Ó Corráin, however, merely states that Bróðir was killed on the day of the battle and that Brian was killed in his tent "by Norsemen fleeing from the scene".

According to Njal's Saga, Óspak was on the wing opposite King Sigtrygg Silkbeard. Óspak went through the entire battle on this wing, and was sorely wounded and lost both his sons before Sigtrygg fled. However, that Óspak engaged Sigtrygg contradicts the historical opinion that Sigtrygg did not actually take part in the battle but was instead holding the garrison in reserve in Dublin.

== Historicity and legacy ==
The Oxford Dictionary of National Biography notes that the Irish surname Ó Bruadair – frequently anglicised as "Broder" or "Broderick" – may be an amalgamation of the Irish element "Ó" ("grandson of") and the Norse name Brodir. However, although Norse origins are often claimed for the surname, it has been on record in Ireland for centuries before the Anglo–Norman invasion. The name occurs most commonly in Munster and south-east Leinster.

An article on the historicity of the Icelandic sagas notes that "Brodir" is not a Norse proper name at all, and is itself derived from the Irish name variously written as Bruattar, Bruadar or Brodur. According to the article, the name first appears in the Annals of Ulster in the year 853, when a princeling of south-east Ireland named Bruattar mac Aeda was involved in the murder of a rival before being slain himself. The name only appears in Norse context twice – at the Battle of Clontarf, and in 1160 for the King of Dublin, Brodar mac Torcaill – and had a longer circulation in Irish literature. The same article also suggests that while there is no doubt about the historical truth of the Battle of Clontarf, the name "Ospakr", along with other names in the Njál's saga account of the Clontarf episode, may have been borrowed from the Landnámabók.
