= Ulf the Quarrelsome =

Legendary Irish nobleman

Ulf the Quarrelsome, or Ulf Hreda, is described in Njals Saga as a brother to Brian Boru, High King of Ireland from 1002 to 1014. He is primarily mentioned in the saga's account of the Battle of Clontarf of 1014, during which he gruesomely killed Brodir of the Isle of Man to avenge his brother's death at the hands of the invaders:

Ulf the Quarrelsome cut open his belly, and led him round and round the trunk of a tree, and so wound all his entrails out of him, and he did not die before they were all drawn out of him.

Some have identified Ulf as a brother of Brian, named Cuiduligh.
