= Brodrick Peak =

Mountain in New Zealand

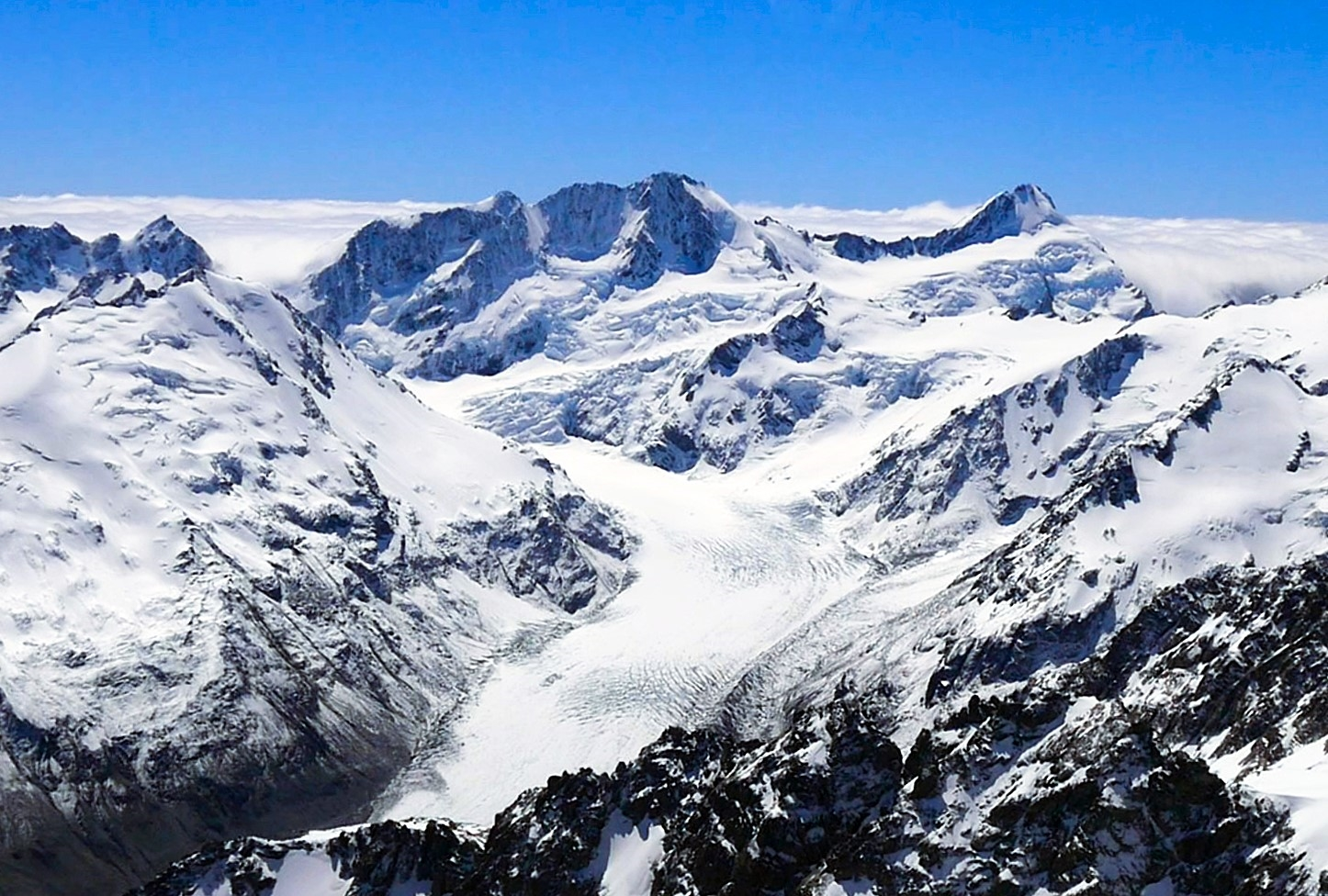
- South aspect, centred on skyline

Highest point
- Elevation: 2,669 m (8,757 ft)
- Prominence: 269 m (883 ft)
- Isolation: 2.81 km (1.75 mi)
- Listing: New Zealand #26
- Coordinates: 43°29′53″S 170°23′38″E

Naming
- Etymology: Noel Brodrick
- Native name: Tarahaka (Māori)

Geography
- Location within New Zealand
- Interactive map of Brodrick Peak
- Location: South Island
- Country: New Zealand
- Region: Canterbury / West Coast
- Protected area: Aoraki / Mount Cook National Park
- Parent range: Southern Alps
- Topo map(s): NZMS260 I35; Topo50 BX16

Climbing
- First ascent: 1917

Brodrick Peak is a 2,669-metre-elevation (8,757-foot) mountain in New Zealand.

== Description ==
Brodrick Peak is situated on the crest or Main Divide of the Southern Alps and on the boundary of Aoraki / Mount Cook National Park. It is located 194 kilometres (121 mi) west of the city of Christchurch and set on the common boundary shared by the Canterbury and West Coast Regions of the South Island. Precipitation runoff from the mountain drains northwest into the Whataroa River, south to the Murchison River, and east to the Godley River. Topographic relief is significant as the summit rises 1,400 metres (4,593 feet) above the Whymper Glacier in two kilometres. The nearest higher neighbour is Mount Aylmer, 2.82 kilometres to the southwest. The first ascent of the summit was made on 1 December 1917 by Will Kennedy and Jack Lippe.

== Etymology ==
This mountain's toponym honours Noel Brodrick (1855–1931), district surveyor for South Canterbury who explored much of this region from 1881 through 1891. The Māori name for the peak is "Tarahaka", meaning indentation or saddle of a hill.

== Climbing ==
Climbing routes with first ascents:

- Main Divide – Will Kennedy, Jack Lippe – (1917)
- Via Whymper Saddle – D.W. Beatty, P.A.L. Fraser, A.W. McNaught, J.V. McNulty – (1955)
- South West Ridge (descent) – John Gamlen, Keith McNaughton – (1967)
- Loves Last (South Face) – Graham Love, Dave Carlyle – (1985)
- South East Ridge – FA unknown
- Via Whataroa Saddle – FA unknown

== Climate ==
Based on the Köppen climate classification, Brodrick Peak is located in a marine west coast (Cfb) climate zone, with a tundra climate at the summit. Prevailing westerly winds blow moist air from the Tasman Sea onto the mountains, where the air is forced upwards by the mountains (orographic lift), causing moisture to drop in the form of rain or snow. This climate supports the Murchison, Classen, and Whymper glaciers surrounding this mountain's slopes. The months of December through February offer the most favourable weather for viewing or climbing this peak.

== See also ==
- List of mountains of New Zealand by height
