= Jack Broderick =

Canadian lacrosse player

Olympic medal record

Men's lacrosse

Representing Canada
Gold medal – first place	1908 London	Team

John Charles Broderick (June 5, 1877 – July 12, 1957) was a Canadian lacrosse player who competed in the 1908 Summer Olympics. He was part of the Canadian team, which won the gold medal. He was the son of John (Sr.) and Johanna Broderick, née Flannigan. He never married. He is buried in St. Columban's Cemetery in Cornwall, Ontario, and was inducted into the Cornwall Sports Hall of Fame in 1968.
