= Mike Broderick =

American politician

Member of the South Dakota Senate from the 16th district
- In office 2005–2006

Member of the South Dakota House of Representatives from the 16th district
- In office 1993–2002

Personal details
- Born: February 27, 1939 (age 87) Walthill, Nebraska
- Party: Republican
- Spouse: Lois Jean Broderick

Michael Bernard. Broderick, Jr. (born February 27, 1939) was a member of the South Dakota State Senate, representing district 16.

Broderick is from Canton, South Dakota. He was appointed to the South Dakota State House of Representatives in 1993 to fill the vacancy left by Michael O'Connor. Broderick remained in the state House of Representatives until 2002. He served in the South Dakota State Senate from 2005 until the 2006.
