= John Broderick (politician) =

American businessman and politician (1865–1939)

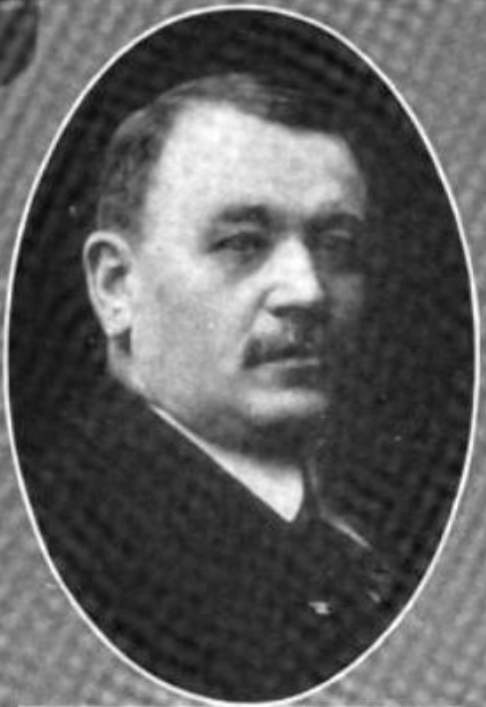

Member of the Illinois Senate
- In office 1898–1902
- In office 1906–1924
- In office 1926–1940

Personal details
- Born: 1865 Ireland
- Died: August 9, 1939 (aged 74) Chicago, Illinois
- Party: Democratic
- Occupation: Businessman, politician

John Broderick (1865 – August 9, 1939) was an American businessman and politician. He was born in Ireland, and lived in Chicago, Illinois was involved with the insurance business. Broderick served in the Illinois Illinois Senate, 1899–1903, 1907–1923, 1927-1939 and was a Democrat. He was of Welsh descent.
