= Timeline of Irish history =

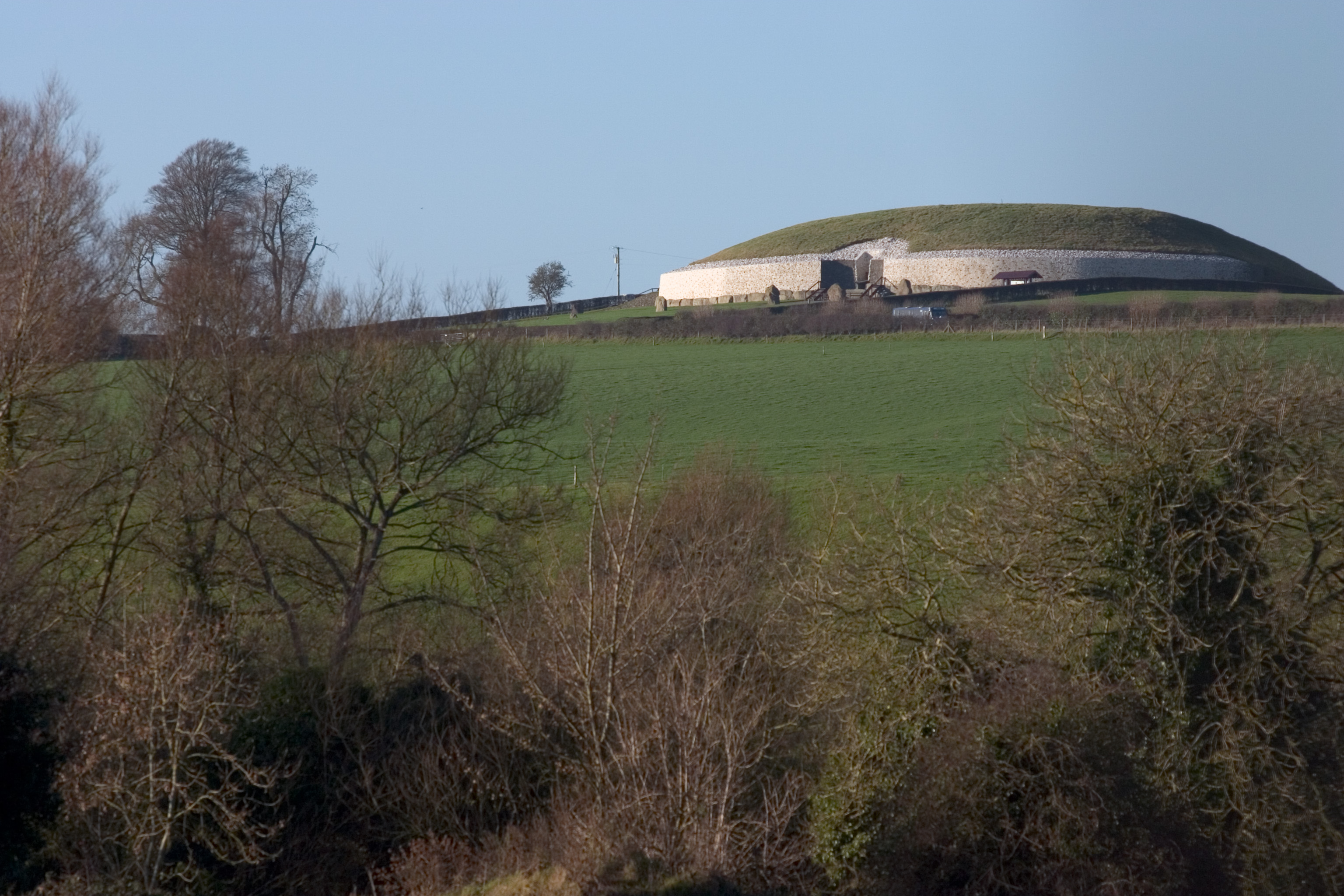
Newgrange passage tomb was built in Ireland during the Neolithic period

This is a timeline of Irish history, comprising important legal and territorial changes and political events in Ireland. To read about the background to these events, see History of Ireland. See also the list of Lords and Kings of Ireland, alongside Irish heads of state, and the list of years in Ireland.

== Mesolithic and neolithic periods ==
Year	Date	Event
c. 16,000 BC		During the Last Glacial Maximum, Ireland is covered in ice sheets
c. 12,000 BC		A narrow channel forms between Prehistoric Ireland and southwest Scotland
c. 10,000 BC		Carbon-dating on bear bones indicate the presence of Paleolithic people in County Clare.
c. 8000 BC		Mesolithic hunter-gatherers migrate to Ireland
c. 6500 BC		Mesolithic hunter-gatherers occupy sites such as that at Mount Sandel in Ulster
c. 4000 BC		Agriculture (including the keeping of livestock, and crop farming) has its beginnings in Ireland, at sites such as the Céide Fields in Connacht
c. 3500 BC		The Neolithic peoples of the Boyne Valley built a complex of chamber tombs, standing stones and enclosures over a period of hundreds of years. (Newgrange itself is dated to 3300–2900 BC).

== Bronze and Iron Ages ==
Year	Date	Event
c. 2000 BC		Bronze Age technologies start to arrive in Ireland, including the moulding of Ballybeg-type flat axes, and the beginnings of copper mining at Ross Island, Killarney and Mount Gabriel.
c. 500 BC		During the Iron Age in Ireland, Celtic influence in art, language and culture begins to take hold.
c. 300 BC		Murder of Clonycavan Man, according to radiocarbon dating
c. 200 BC		La Tène influence from continental Europe influences carvings on the Turoe Stone, Bullaun, County Galway.
c. 100 BC		Additional works expand the site at Navan Fort (Emain Macha), first occupied in the Neolithic period

== 1st century ==
Year	Date	Event
c. 100 AD		Construction of a series of defensive ditches between the provinces of Ulster and Connacht

== 2nd century ==
Year	Date	Event
c. 140 AD		Ptolemy's Geographia provides the earliest known written reference to habitation in the Dublin area, referring to a settlement in the area as Eblana Civitas

== 3rd century ==
Year	Date	Event
c. 220 AD		The Annals of the Four Masters, Foras Feasa ar Éirinn, and other semi-historical (non-contemporary) texts, place Cormac mac Airt as a longstanding High King of Ireland. (The Annals date his reign as 226–266, but scholars vary in their assessment of Mac Airt's reign as legend or historical fact)

== 4th century ==
Year	Date	Event
c. 300 AD		Pollen data records from the late Iron Age indicate a resurgence in human activity after a relatively stagnant period

== 5th century ==
Year	Date	Event
c. 400		Niall Noígíallach is placed by Medieval texts as a legendary Goidelic High King of Ireland (the Annals of the Four Masters dates his reign as 378–405)
431		Palladius is sent as the first bishop "to the Irish believing in Christ" by Pope Celestine I
432		According to the Annals of Ulster (and other chronicles), Saint Patrick returns to Ireland.

== 6th century ==
Year	Date	Event
536		A seemingly global climate event (possibly a volcanic winter) causes crop failures and famine in Ireland.
563		Irish monastic influence during the Golden Age peaks with the foundation of monastic schools by Saint Columba and Saint Brendan at Iona and Clonfert. (Saint Columbanus would later set up similar institutions in continental Europe, Fursa in East Anglia and Gaul, Aidan at Lindisfarne. Etc.)

== 7th century ==
Year	Date	Event
664–666		Several sources record a pervasive "yellow plague" on the island.

== 8th century ==
Year	Date	Event
795		First Viking raids on Iona, Rathlin Island, and Inishmurray.

== 9th century ==
Year	Date	Event
830		Óengus of Tallaght writes the Martyrology of Tallaght, the Prologue of which speaks of the last vestiges of paganism in Ireland
852		Vikings Ivar Beinlaus and Olaf the White land in Dublin Bay, and establish a fortress close to where the city of Dublin now stands

== 10th century ==
Year	Date	Event
980		The King of Dublin Olaf Cuaran abdicates following defeat at the Battle of Tara to Máel Sechnaill mac Domnaill.
988–989		Máel Sechnaill demands (and is paid) "tribute" by the Vikings at Dublin (this tribute date is sometimes recognised as the "foundation date" of Dublin as a city)

== 11th century ==
Year	Date	Event
1014	23 April	Defeat of Máel Mórda mac Murchada and Viking forces by the armies of Brian Boru at the Battle of Clontarf marks the beginning of the decline of Viking power in Ireland.

== 12th century ==
Year	Date	Event
1167		Following exile by Ruaidrí Ua Conchobair, Dermot MacMurrough seeks support from Henry II of England to reclaim his Kingship.
1171		Henry II of England lands at Waterford and declares his youngest son John Lord of Ireland.
1175	6 October	The Treaty of Windsor consolidates Norman influence in Ireland.

== 13th century ==
Year	Date	Event
1216	12 November	Great Charter of Ireland issued by Henry III of England.
1252		The Annals of the Four Masters records a summer-time heat wave and drought.
1297		The first representative Irish Parliament (of the Lordship of Ireland) meets in Dublin.

== 14th century ==
Year	Date	Event
1315	26 May	Edward Bruce arrives in Ireland and rallies many Irish lords against Anglo-Norman control.
1366	20 April	The Statutes of Kilkenny are passed at Kilkenny to curb the decline of the Hiberno-Norman Lordship of Ireland.
1398		Gerald FitzGerald, 3rd Earl of Desmond, mysteriously disappears; Gearóid Íarla is forever afterwards judged to be sleeping in a cave under Lough Gur, waiting to gallop out on his silver-shod horse and rescue Ireland at the moment of greatest need.

== 15th century ==
Year	Date	Event
1472		The Annals of the Four Masters records that the King of England sent an exotic animal (possibly a giraffe) to Ireland.
1490		An earthquake takes place at Sliabh Gamh in County Mayo.
1494	1 December	A parliament summoned by Edward Poyning, Henry VII of England's Lord Deputy, passes Poynings' Law, under which the Irish parliament is to pass no law without the prior consent of the English parliament.
1497		The Annals of the Four Masters refers to a famine which "prevailed through all Ireland".

== 16th century ==
Year	Date	Event
1534	11 June	Thomas FitzGerald, the 10th Earl of Kildare, publicly renounces his allegiance to Henry VIII of England.
1537	3 February	FitzGerald is hanged, drawn and quartered at Tyburn.
1542		The Irish parliament passes the Crown of Ireland Act, which establishes a Kingdom of Ireland to be ruled by Henry VIII and his successors.
1570	25 February	Pope Pius V issues a papal bull, Regnans in Excelsis, declaring Elizabeth I of England a heretic and releasing her subjects from any allegiance to her.
1575	May–August	The Annals of the Four Masters records a drought, in which no rain fell "from Bealtaine to Lammas" (1 May to 1 August), resulting in disease and plague.
1577	November	The Annals of the Four Masters records that the Great Comet of 1577 "was wondered at by all universally".
1579	16 July	Second Desmond Rebellion: James FitzMaurice FitzGerald, a cousin of the 14th Earl of Desmond, lands a small force of rebels at Dingle.
1594		The Nine Years' War commences in Ulster, as Hugh O'Neill and Red Hugh O'Donnell rebel against Elizabeth I's authority in Ulster.

== 17th century ==
Year	Date	Event
1607	14 September	The Flight of the Earls: The departure from Ireland of Hugh O'Neill, 2nd Earl of Tyrone and Rory O'Donnell, 1st Earl of Tyrconnell.
1609		Plantation of Ulster by Scottish Presbyterians begins on a large scale.
1641	22 October	Irish Rebellion of 1641: Phelim O'Neill leads the capture of several forts in the north of Ireland.
1642		Irish Confederate Wars: The Irish Catholic Confederation is established, under the nominal overlordship of Charles I of England, with its capital at Kilkenny.
1646	28 March	The Supreme Council of the Irish Catholic Confederation signs an agreement with a representative of Charles I, which procures some rights for Catholics in return for their military support of the royalists in England.
1646		The members of the Supreme Council are arrested; the General Assembly renounces the agreement with England.
1647		A more favourable agreement is reached with Charles's representative, which promises toleration of Catholicism, a repeal of Poynings' Law, and recognition of lands taken by Irish Catholics during the war.
1690	1 July	Battle of the Boyne
1691	12 July	Battle of Aughrim; One of the bloodiest fought in Ireland, with up to 7,000 people killed
1695		The Education Act, one of a series of Penal Laws, is passed in 1695. It prohibits Catholics from sending their children to be educated abroad, and remains in place until 1782.

== 18th century ==
Year	Date	Event
1740		Extreme winters in successive years result in poor harvests, causing a large-scale famine in which between 300,000 and 480,000 die.
1760	February	Battle of Carrickfergus: A French invasion.
1782		After agitation by the Irish Volunteers, the Parliament of Great Britain passes a number of reforms—including the implicit repeal of Poynings' Law—collectively referred to as the Constitution of 1782.
1796	December	Expédition d'Irlande: Attempted French invasion.
1798	24 May	Battle of Ballymore-Eustace: A miscarried surprise attack on the British garrison at Ballymore in County Kildare is counterattacked and defeated.
1798	22 August	Irish Rebellion of 1798: One thousand French soldiers land at Kilcummin in support of the rebellion.
1798	27 August	Battle of Castlebar: A combined French-Irish force defeats a vastly numerically superior British force at Castlebar.
1798	27 August	Irish Rebellion of 1798: The Republic of Connacht is proclaimed at Castlebar, in the first United Irishmen rebellion.

== 19th century ==
Year	Date	Event
1801	1 January	Acts of Union 1800 comes into effect; the Kingdom of Ireland unites with Great Britain, forming the United Kingdom of Great Britain and Ireland.
1803	23 July	Second United Irishmen rebellion: The Irish nationalist Robert Emmet attempts to seize Dublin Castle.
1829	24 March	Catholic Emancipation: The Roman Catholic Relief Act 1829 is passed, allowing Catholics to sit in the UK Parliament.
1831	3 May	Tithe War: A force of one hundred and twenty armed police forcibly takes possession of cattle belonging to a Roman Catholic priest, in lieu of his compulsory tithe to the Anglican Church of Ireland.
1834	17 December	Dublin and Kingstown Railway is opened as the first commercial railway in Ireland.
1836		Tithe War: The passage of the Tithe Commutation Act 1836 reduces the amount of the church's tithe and changes the manner of payment, which largely ends the unrest.
1845–1849		Great Irish Famine: A potato blight destroys two-thirds of Ireland's staple crop, leading to an estimated 1 million deaths and emigration of a further 1 million people.
1867	5 March	Fenian Rising.
1879-1882		The "Land War," a period of rural agitation for fair rents and free sale of land to liberate Irish peasants from generations of debt and tenancy.
1886		1st Home Rule Bill, also known as the Government of Ireland Bill 1886.
1893		2nd Home Rule Bill, also known as the Government of Ireland Bill 1893.

== 20th century ==
Year	Date	Event
1913	19 August	A Dublin businessman, William Martin Murphy, fires forty workers he suspects belong to the Irish Transport and General Workers' Union (ITGWU). A resulting strike and related civil unrest, the Dublin Lockout, lasts from August 1913 to January 1914.
1914	18 September	Government of Ireland Act is passed, providing for Irish Home Rule, but its application is simultaneously postponed for the duration of World War I.
1916	24 April	Easter Rising: The Irish Republican Brotherhood leads an action which seizes key government buildings in Dublin, and issues the Proclamation of the Irish Republic. The Rising lasts til 29 April 1916.
1918	18 April	Acting on a resolution of Dublin Corporation, the Lord Mayor convenes a conference at the Mansion House to devise plans to resist conscription.
1918	14 December	A general election returns a majority for Sinn Féin.
1919	21 January	The First Dáil of the Irish Republic meets and issues a Declaration of Independence from the UK.
1919	21 January	Irish War of Independence: Volunteers of the Irish Republican Army (IRA) kill two members of the Royal Irish Constabulary in what is considered to be the first act of the War of Independence.
1921	3 May	Northern Ireland is established.
1921	6 December	Irish War of Independence: The War of Independence ends when negotiations between the British government and representatives of the de facto Irish Republic conclude with the signing of the Anglo-Irish Treaty and the creation of the Irish Free State.
1922	28 June	Irish Civil War: Bombardment by Michael Collins of Anti-Treaty forces occupying the Four Courts marks the start of the Irish Civil War,
1923	24 May	Irish Civil War: IRA Chief of Staff Frank Aiken orders volunteers to dump arms, effectively ending the Civil War.
1925	17 September	An election was held for 19 of the 60 seats in Seanad Éireann. Single transferable vote was used, with the entire state forming a single 19-seat electoral district, the largest number of members elected in one contest in Irish history.
1928	12 December 1928	The new Irish Free State introduced its own currency from 1928, the Irish pound.
1932	June 1932	The 31st International Eucharistic Congress, held in Dublin 22–26 June 1932.
1937	29 December	The Constitution of Ireland comes into force, replacing the Irish Free State with a new state called "Éire", or, in the English language, "Ireland"
1949	18 April	The Republic of Ireland Act abolishes the statutory functions of the British monarch in relation to Ireland and confers them on the President of Ireland.
1955	14 December	Ireland joins the United Nations along with sixteen other sovereign states.
1969	August	Troops are deployed on the streets of Northern Ireland, marking the start of the Troubles.
1972	March	The Parliament of Northern Ireland is prorogued (and abolished later the following year).
1973	1 January	Ireland joins the European Community along with the United Kingdom and Denmark.
1973	June	The Northern Ireland Assembly is elected.
1974	1 January	A power-sharing Northern Ireland Executive takes office, but resigns in May as a result of the Ulster Workers' Council strike; the Assembly is suspended and later abolished.
1979	29 September to 1 October	Pope John Paul II visited Ireland from Saturday, 29 September to Monday, 1 October 1979, the first trip to Ireland by a Pope.
1985	15 November	The governments of Ireland and the United Kingdom sign the Anglo-Irish Agreement.
1990	3 December	Mary Robinson becomes the first female President of Ireland.
1995		Ireland enters the Celtic Tiger period, a time of high economic growth which continues until 2007.
1998	April	The Belfast Agreement is signed; as a result, the Northern Ireland Assembly is elected, to which powers are devolved in 1999 and a power-sharing Executive takes office.
1999	1 January	Ireland yields its official currency, the Irish pound, and adopts the Euro.

== 21st century ==
Year	Date	Event
2013	15 December	The Economic Adjustment Programme for Ireland, which Ireland entered into in November 2010 following the post-2008 Irish economic downturn and related banking crisis, officially comes to a close.
2015	23 May	A 62% to 38% referendum result makes Ireland the first country to legalise same-sex marriage by popular vote.
2018	August	Pope Francis visited Ireland on 25 and 26 August 2018, as part of the World Meeting of Families 2018.
