= 5th century in Ireland =

Events from the 5th century in Ireland.

== 5th century ==
405

- Possible year of death of Niall Noígíallach. The Annals of the Four Masters dates his accession to 378 and death to 405. The chronology of Geoffrey Keating's Foras Feasa ar Éirinn broadly agrees, dating his reign from 368 to 395, and associating his raiding activities in Great Britain with the kidnapping of Saint Patrick. However, the traditional roll of kings and its chronology is now recognised as artificial. The High Kingship did not become a reality until the 9th century, and Niall's legendary status has been inflated in line with the political importance of the dynasty he founded. Based on Uí Néill genealogies and the dates given for his supposed sons and grandsons, modern historians believe that he is likely to have lived some 50 years later than the traditional dates, dying circa 450.

410

- At about this date, with the end of Roman rule in Britain, raiders from Ireland such as the Uí Liatháin and Laigin harry the coasts of Britain. They plunder towns and capture slaves but later colonise large areas of Gwynedd, in particular the Llŷn Peninsula, the coasts of Arllechwedd and Arfon and Anglesey.

== 430s ==
431

- Palladius sent by Pope Celestine I as bishop to Irish Christians

432

- Saint Patrick arrives in Ireland to help convert pagan Gaelic kings to Christianity (traditional date) (but see also 456)

435 or 436

- Death of Bressal Belach, King of Leinster

== 440s ==
440

- Death of Amalgaid mac Fiachrae, king of Connacht whose death led to a long-running dispute over the succession

444

- Niall of the Nine Hostages active in Ireland and Britain (but see the year 405 as well)
- Armagh founded as the chief church in Ireland.

445

- Death of Dathí/Nath Í mac Fiachrae

446

- Battle of Femen, in Brega; Mac Cairthinn mac Coelboth, King of Leinster, killed

447

- Death of Secundinus/St Seachnaill, bishop in Ireland, on 27 November, founder of Dunshaughlin

== 450s ==
450

- Probable date of fall of Ulaid over-kingdom
- Approximate date of the foundation by St Macculin of a monastery at Lusk
- Death of Niall Noígíallach (see the entry for 405 for more on this)

451

- Probable year of birth of Brigid of Kildare (Saint Brigid)

453

- Probable date of death of Niall of the Nine Hostages (but see also the years 405 and 450)
- Probable date of the start of the reign of Óengus mac Nad Froích, first Christian king of Munster

454

- Lóegaire mac Néill, King of Tara, celebrates Feis Temro (Feast of Tara), pagan inauguration rite.

456

- Suggested date - 5 April - for arrival of St. Patrick in Ireland (but see also 432)

457

- Probable death of Palladius

459

- Death of Auxilius, missionary bishop in Ireland, founder of Killashee, County Kildare

== 460s ==
461 or 462

- Death of Lóegaire mac Néill, King of Tara, son of Niall Noígiallach, who founded the kingdom of Tír Eógain (modern County Tyrone)

464

- The murder of King Conall Gulban of Donegal by the Masraighe at Magh Slécht

465

- Death of Iserninus, missionary bishop in Ireland (Epsop Fith), founder of Kilcullen, County Kildare, and Aghade, County Carlow
- Death of Eógan mac Néill, son of Niall Noígiallach, who founded the kingdom of Tír Eógain (modern County Tyrone) (but see also 461)

467

- Death of St. Benigius, Bishop of Armagh

468

- Battle of Bri Ele

469

- Ailill Molt mac Nath Í/Dathí celebrates Feis Temro

== 470s ==
470

- First Battle of Dumha Aichir

476

- First Battle of Granard

== 480s ==
480

- Second Battle of Granard

481

- Death of St. Iarliathe mac Treno, third bishop of Armagh

482

- Battle of Ochae (in Mide or Leinster). Ailill Molt killed, and the Uí Néill branch of the Connachta monopolise kingship of Tara

483

- Assassination of Cremthann mac Endai Chennselaig, King of Leinster

484

- Probable year of birth of Saint Brendan "the Navigator"

485

- Death of Fincath mac Garrchu (or Findchad mac Garrchon), King of Leinster

485 or 486

- Battle of Granard or Grainaret. Coirpre mac Néill, King of Tara, defeats and kills Fincath mac Garrchu or Findchad mac Garrchon: he was a king of Leinster, was defeated and killed by the Uí Néill. (He is not mentioned as king in the Book of Leinster, he is however given this title in the Annals of Innisfallen).

486

- Death of Crimthann mac Énnai Cennsalach who was a King of Leinster from the Uí Cheinnselaig sept of the Laigin. He was the son of Énna Cennsalach, the ancestor of this dynasty.

487

- Death of Bishop Mel of Ardagh, 6 February

489

- Battle of Cell Osnadha: death of Óengus mac Nad Froích, first Christian King of Munster
- Battle of Tailtin
- Death of St. Cianán of Duleek, a follower of St. Patrick, on 24 November

== 490s ==
490

- In about this year, the Dál Riata establish a kingdom in Scotland

492

- About this year the deaths occur of St. Mac Caill, Bishop of Cruachu Brig Ele (Croghan, County Offaly); and Óengus mac Nad Froích, King of Cashel (but see also 489)

493

- The battle of Sruth
- The second battle of Granairet
- 17 March: traditional date for the death of St. Patrick (also entered in Annals of Ulster under A.D. 492). Cath Corp Naomh Padraigh ("Battle for the Body of St. Patrick" fought for possession of his body)

494

- Battle of Ceann Ailbhe

495

- Second Battle of Granard; Echu mac Coirpri defeats and kills Fráech mac Finchada, King of Leinster (but see also 480)

496

- 6 September: death of St. Mac Cuilinn, Bishop of Lusk

497

- Death of Cormac, Bishop of Armagh, heres Patricii (heir of Patrick)

498

- Birth of saint Kevin of Glendalough (died 618 according to his legend), the Abbot of Glendalough in County Wicklow, Ireland
- 23 June: death of St. Mo Choi of Nendrum; also listed under 497 in Annals of Ulster

499

- "Bellum" (war) listed as occurring in Leinster
- 23 April: death of Bishop Ibar of Bergerin, Wexford Harbour

== 500 ==
500

- Composition of archaic Leinster genealogical poems by Laidcenn mac Bairchedo and others
- Archaic Old Irish period (to c. AD 700)
- Warfare continues in Leinster between its kings and the Connachta
