= Crimthann mac Énnai =

Crimthann mac Énnai (died 483) was a King of Leinster from the Uí Cheinnselaig sept of the Laigin. He was the son of Énnae Cennsalach, the ancestor of this dynasty.

== Biography ==
It is not known when he acquired the throne but, in the annals record of the Battle of Áth Dara, on the River Barrow in Mag Ailbe (South County Kildare), in 458, both the Annals of Ulster and the Chronicum Scotorum name Crimthann as the leader of the Laigin forces. The Laigin defeated the high king Lóegaire mac Néill (died 462) and captured him. They released him after he promised not to levy the cattle-tribute from Leinster again.

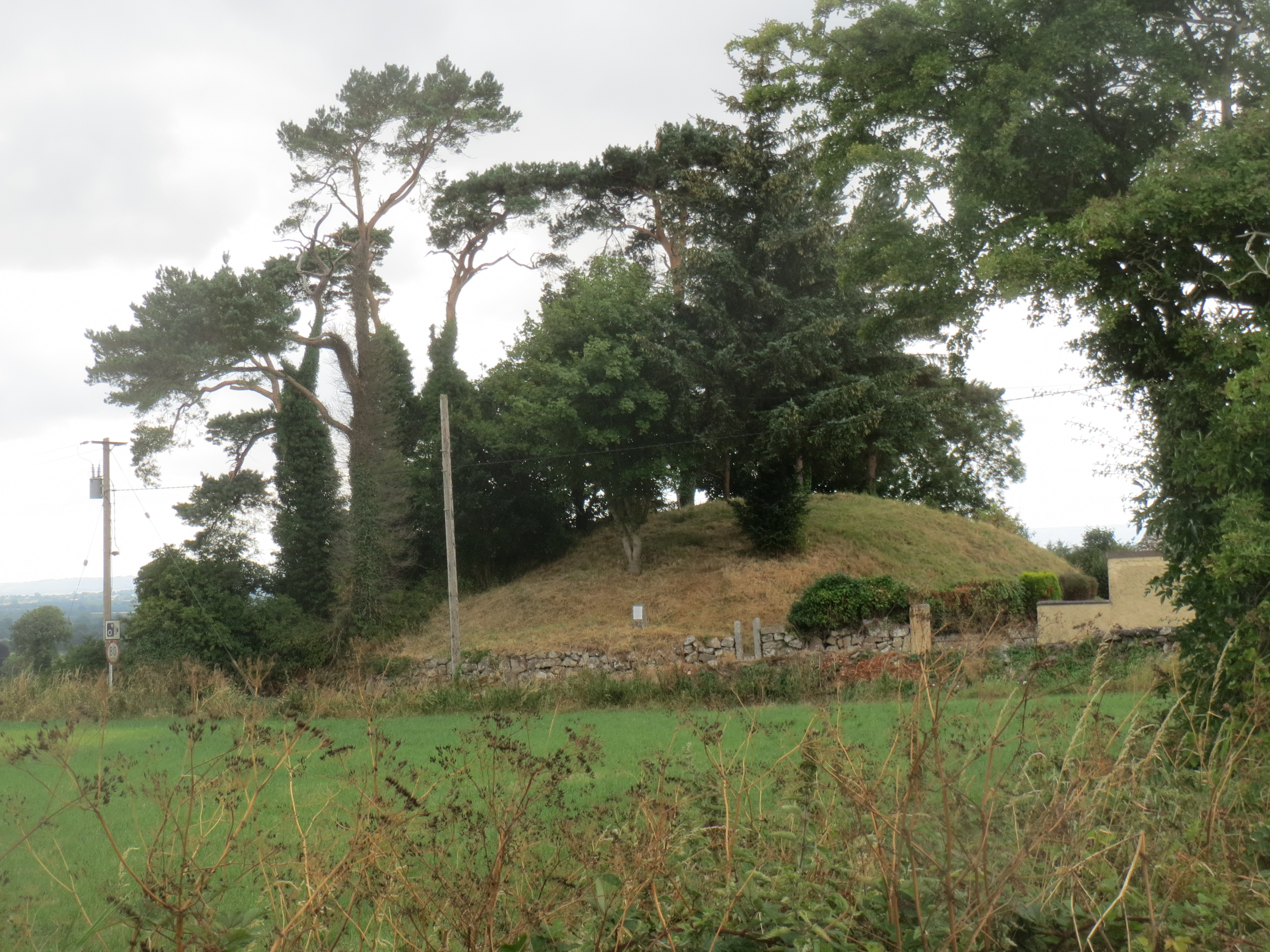
Crimthann was baptized by St Patrick on Rathvilly Moat.

Crimthann was baptized by Saint Patrick at Ráith Bilech (Rathvilly Moat, Co.Carlow)

The Annals of the Four Masters claim he was present at the Battle of Ocha of 482 when the high king Ailill Molt was slain but this is not confirmed by the other annals.

The annals record that he was slain (mortally wounded) in 483 and the Chronicum Scotorum specifies that Eochaid Guinech of the Uí Bairrche and the men of Arad Cliach were responsible. The Annals of the Four Masters state that Eochaid Guinech was the son of his daughter. The Uí Bairrche probably held an earlier predominant position in the south part of Leinster prior to the rise of the Uí Cheinnselaig.

According to Keating, his wife's name was Congain. They had a daughter named Eithne Uatahach (d.490), who was fostered by the Deisi and was married to Óengus mac Nad Froích (d.490), the first Christian king of Munster. She was killed along with her husband at the Battle of Cenn Losnada in Mag Fea (near Leighlin, County Carlow) in 490 by the Uí Dúnlainge sept and the same Eochaid Guinech of the Uí Bairrche who had slain her father.

He had at least one son, Nath Í mac Crimthainn, a King of the Uí Cheinnselaig. Nath Í's sons were 1. Éogan Cáech (a king of the Uí Cheinnselaig), who founded the Síl Fáelchán, Sil Máeluidir, Síl nÉladaig, and Síl Mella septs; 2. Cormacc, who founded the Sil Chormaic sept; 3. Ailill, grandfather of the high-king of Ireland Áed mac Ainmuirech.

In the Kinsella (Chennselaigh) and other genealogies, Crimthann mac Ennai's first wife, and the mother of Nath Í, was Mel - also referred to in The Expulsion of the Déisi (Dessi, Deissi). According to the Expulsion, (which is off by dates), Crimthann married two of Mel's sisters in turn. The second sister was mother to Ingren (sp) who was mother to Crimthann's murdering grandson Eochaid Guinech of the Uí Bairrche. Yet another sister was the mother of Eithne Uatahach, who bore only that one daughter. From the Expulsion: "The three daughters of Ernbrand, Mell and Belc and Cinniu were all three married to Crimthann, one after another. From Mell are the SiT Mella., from Belc the Hui Beilce. Cinniu bore Ethne only to him." The Sil Mella and Ui Meala septs refer to descendants of Mell.

== See also ==
- Kings of Leinster
- Fifth century in Ireland
