= Máel Gualae =

Máel mac Donngaile (died 859), known as Máel Gualae, was a King of Munster from the Eóganacht Chaisil branch of the Eoganachta, the ruling dynasty of Munster. He was of the Clann Faílbe sept of this branch and a grandson of Tnúthgal mac Donngaile (died 820), whom some sources name as King of Munster and brother of Áilgenán mac Donngaile (died 853), also King of Munster. His branch of the ruling dynasty had their lands in the Cashel area of modern County Tipperary. He reigned from 856 to 859.

After the death of Áilgenán in 853 there was an interregnum until the succession of his brother Máel Gualae in 856. The Danes had arrived in Ireland in 849 and took control of Dublin in 851. The dispersed Norse went off to plunder different areas of Ireland and a rivalry began between these two Viking groups with Irish kings using this rivalry in their own conflicts. A number of men in Munster joined up with these Norse and were known as Gall Gaedil ("foreign Gaels"). Cerball mac Dúnlainge (died 888), King of Osraige aligned himself with the Danes versus the Norse to become the most powerful ruler in southern Ireland during this period.

During the interregnum, the High King of Ireland Máel Sechnaill mac Máele Ruanaid (died 862) of Clann Cholmáin led an expedition into Munster in 854 as far as the borders of the Déisi in Tipperary County and took hostages from Munster. The Fragmentary Annals of Ireland claim that Cerball, brother-in-law of the high king, was sent by the high king into Munster as well to claim the hostages. According to the Annals of the Four Masters, the Norse had instigated the opposition to the high king in Munster. The high king appeared again at Cashel to take hostages from Munster in 856, probably at the time of the accession of Máel Gualae.

The Norse activities in Munster were a disruptive influence and around 855 the men of Munster appealed to Cerball of Osraige for aid against the Norse. Cerball arrived with a force of Danes under a leader named Horm and they surrounded the Norse and massacred them. In 856 a Norse force slew Gormán son of Lonán, heir designate of Cashel, at Loch Cenn. In 857 Cerball and his Danish allies, Amlaíb Conung and Ímar, won a victory over the Norse and Gall Gaeill under Kettil "The Fair" in the Munster territory of Arad Tíre in northern Tipperary.

In 858 Máel Sechnaill led a large muster of the men of Ireland into Munster to exact hostages. This time Cerball was his enemy as well as the Leinstermen had complained to the high king of him. The forces of Cerball and Máel Gualae had been stationed at Belach Gabrán in southern Osraige, possibly at Goresbridge on the River Barrow, to oppose the High King's army, but this took an unexpected route and their forces were divided. The High King inflicted a shattering defeat on the forces of Máel Gualae at the Battle of Carn Lugdoch (near modern Waterford) and the King of the Déisi, Máel Crón mac Muiredaig, was slain. The High King remained at Emly for a month raiding all of Munster as far as the sea in Desmond. He took hostages from all the lands of Munster. Many of the Norse-Gaels were slain by the High King's army. The defeat of the Munstermen led Cerball to also submit and give hostages to the high king.

The next year however in 859 Cerball again defied Máel Sechnaill and with his Danish allies led an expedition into Mide. This led to a royal conference at Ráith Aeda Meic Bric (modern Rahugh, County Westmeath) with the High King, the kingdom of Cerball was made directly subject to the high king and separated from Munster. Máel Gualae accepted this transfer of authority. That same year Máel Gualae was captured by the Norsemen who stoned him to death

His son Dub Lachtna mac Máele Gualae (died 895) was also a King of Munster.
