= List of rulers who converted to Christianity =

This is a list of rulers who converted to Christianity. The conversion of monarchs was often an important step in the process of Christianization.

== 1st century ==
- Abgar V, King of Osroene with his capital at Edessa, c. 1st century

== 4th century ==
- Tiridates III of Armenia, King of Armenia, in 301
- Ezana of Axum, King of Aksum, 320
- Constantine I, Roman emperor, in 337
- Mirian III of Iberia, King of Iberia, c. 337
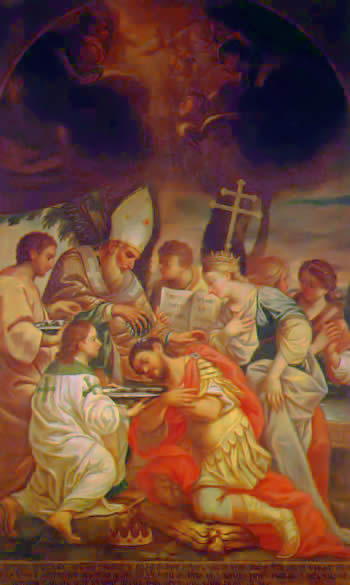
Baptism of Tiridates III

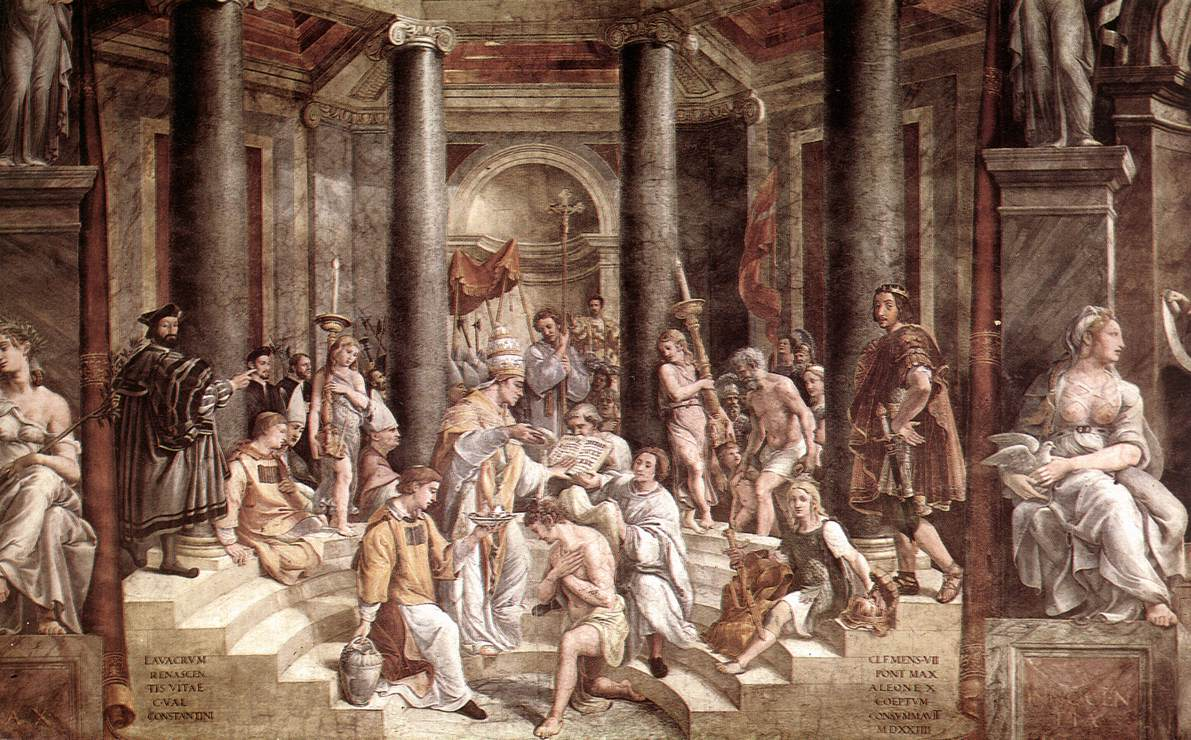
The Baptism of Constantine

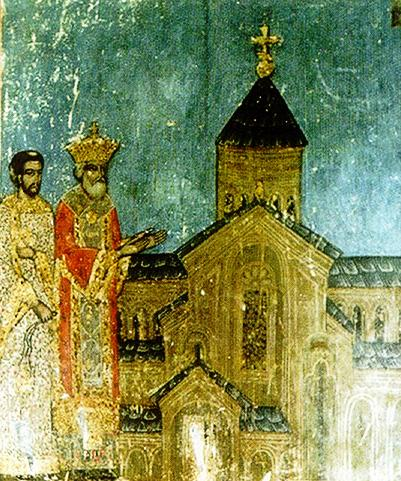
Mirian III

== 5th century ==
- Óengus mac Nad Froích, King of Munster
- Clovis I, King of the Franks, circa 496-506
- Rechiar, King of the Suebi
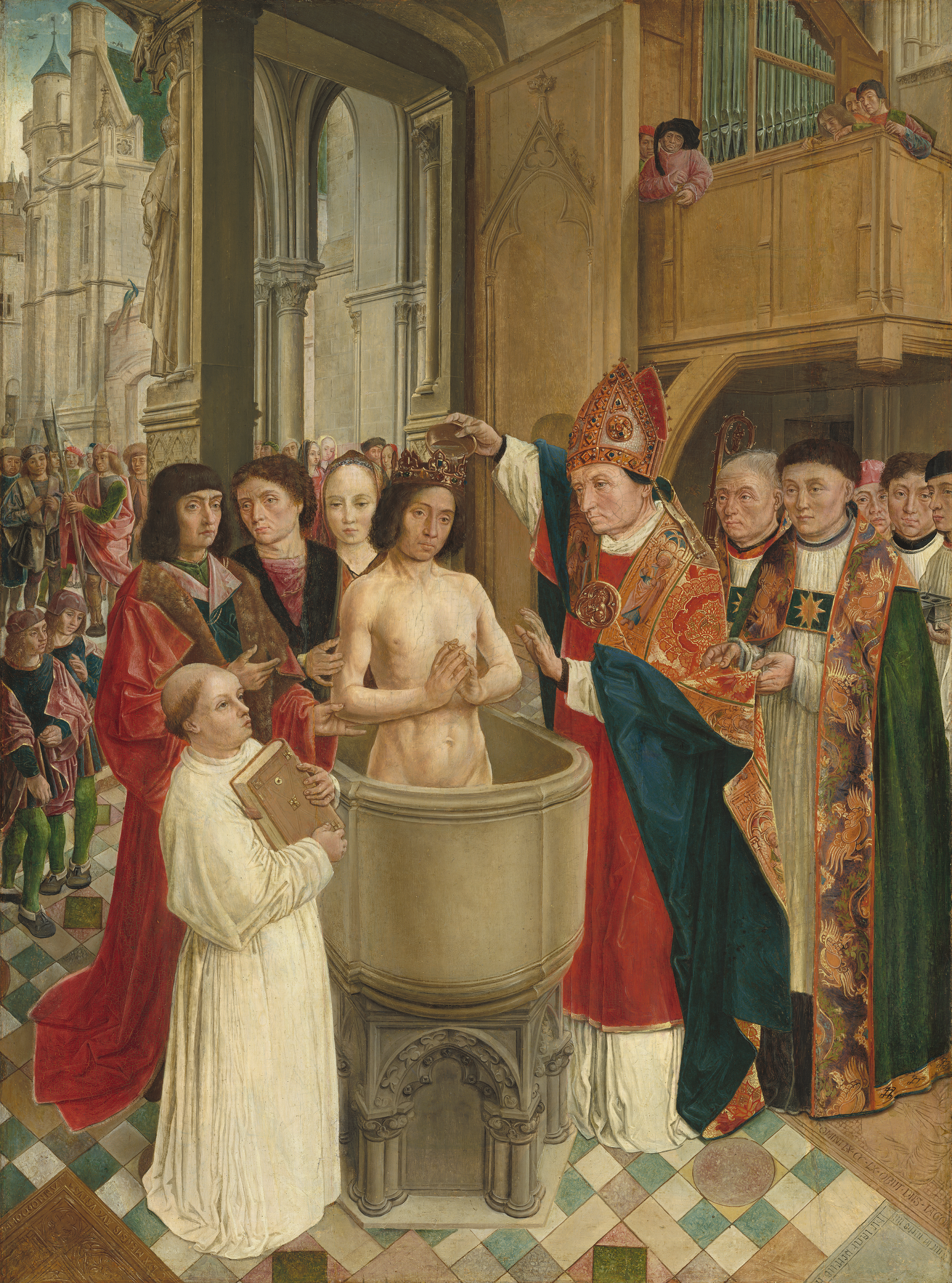
The baptism of Clovis I by Saint Remigius

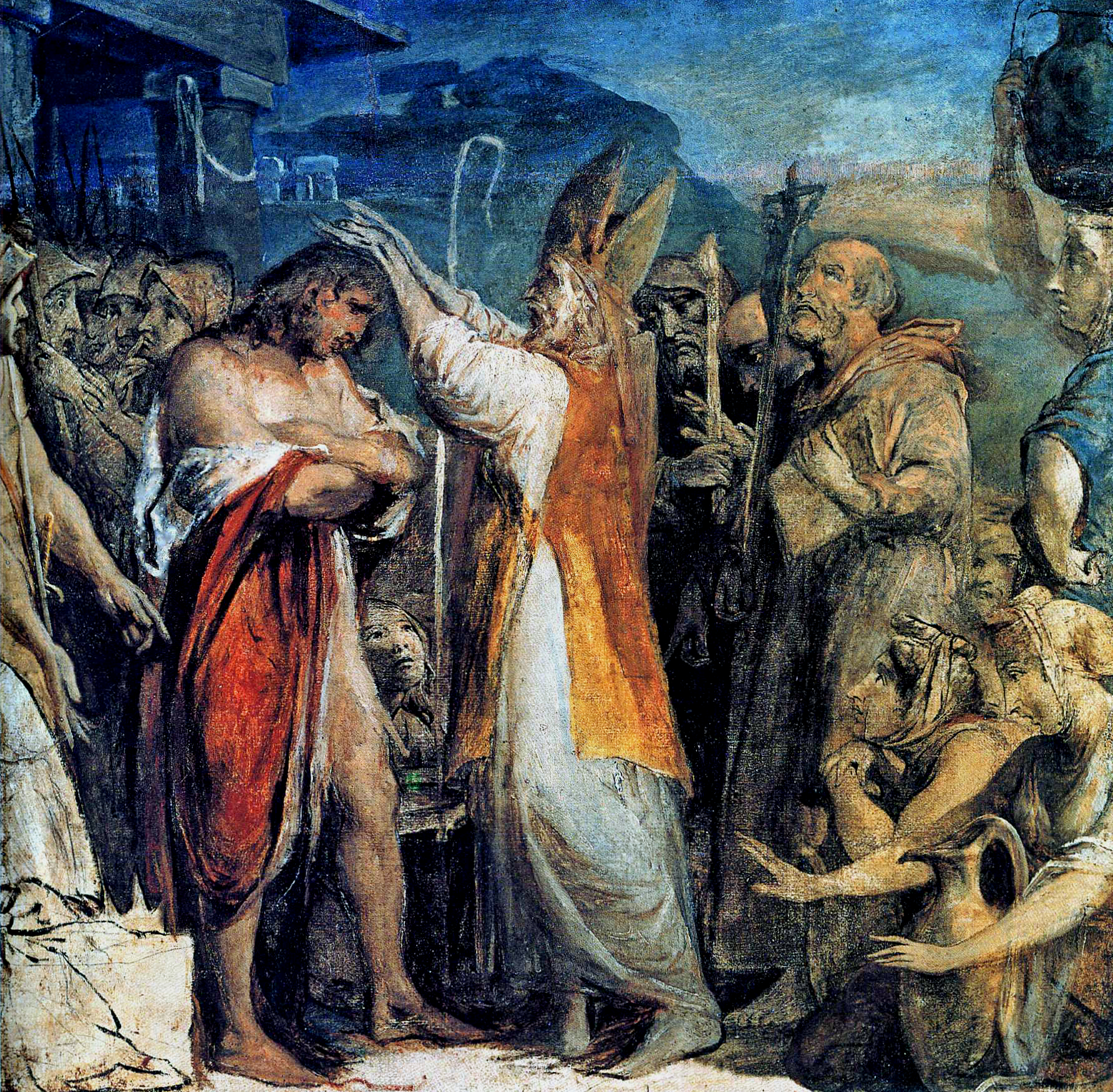
The baptism of Óengus mac Nad Froích by Saint Patrick

== 6th century ==
- Constantine of Dumnonia
- Saint Constantine of Strathclyde
- Rædwald of East Anglia
- Reccared I, king of visigoths, and Hermenegild, sub-king in Baetica, converted from Arianism to the Nicene faith.

== 7th century ==
- Æthelberht of Kent before 601 (see Gregorian mission)
- Cenwalh of Wessex
- Cynegils of Wessex
- Sigeberht of East Anglia
- Riderch I of Alt Clut
- Peada of Mercia
- Edwin of Northumbria

== 9th century ==
- Mojmir I of Moravia (818 or 824)
- Boris I of Bulgaria (864)
- Guthrum (878)
- Borivoj I, Duke of Bohemia (883)
- Rorik of Dorestad
- Harald Klak
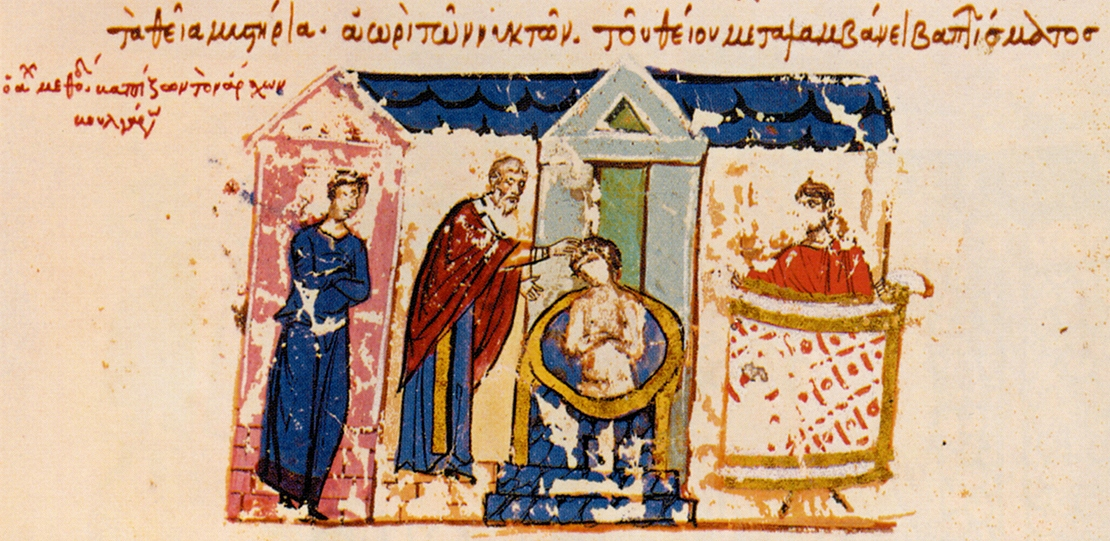
Baptism of Boris I

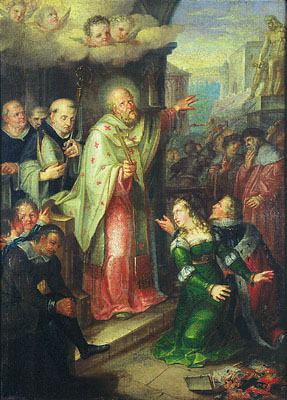
Baptism of Borivoj I by Saint Methodius

== 10th century ==
- Mieszko I of Poland (966)
- Géza, Grand Prince of the Hungarians (970s)
- Vladimir I of Kiev (980s)
- Olaf Tryggvason
- Harald Bluetooth of Denmark and Norway
- Eric the Victorious
- Haakon the Good
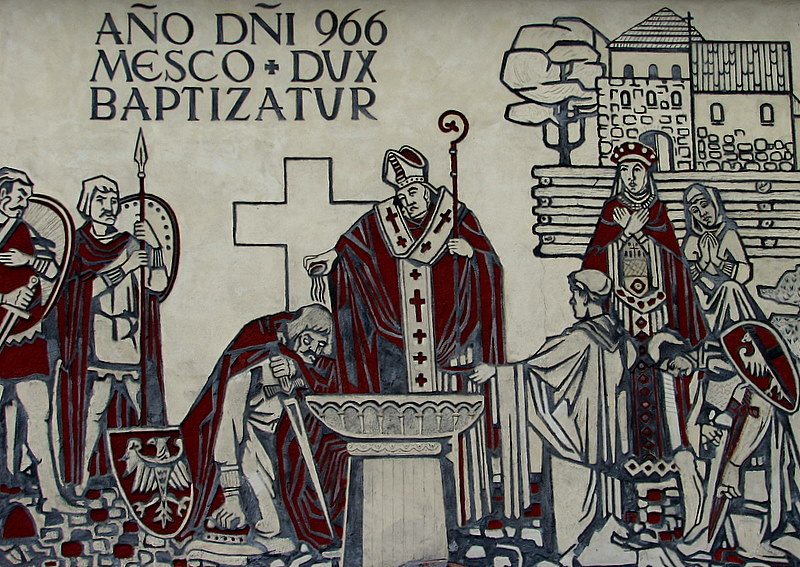
Baptism of Mieszko

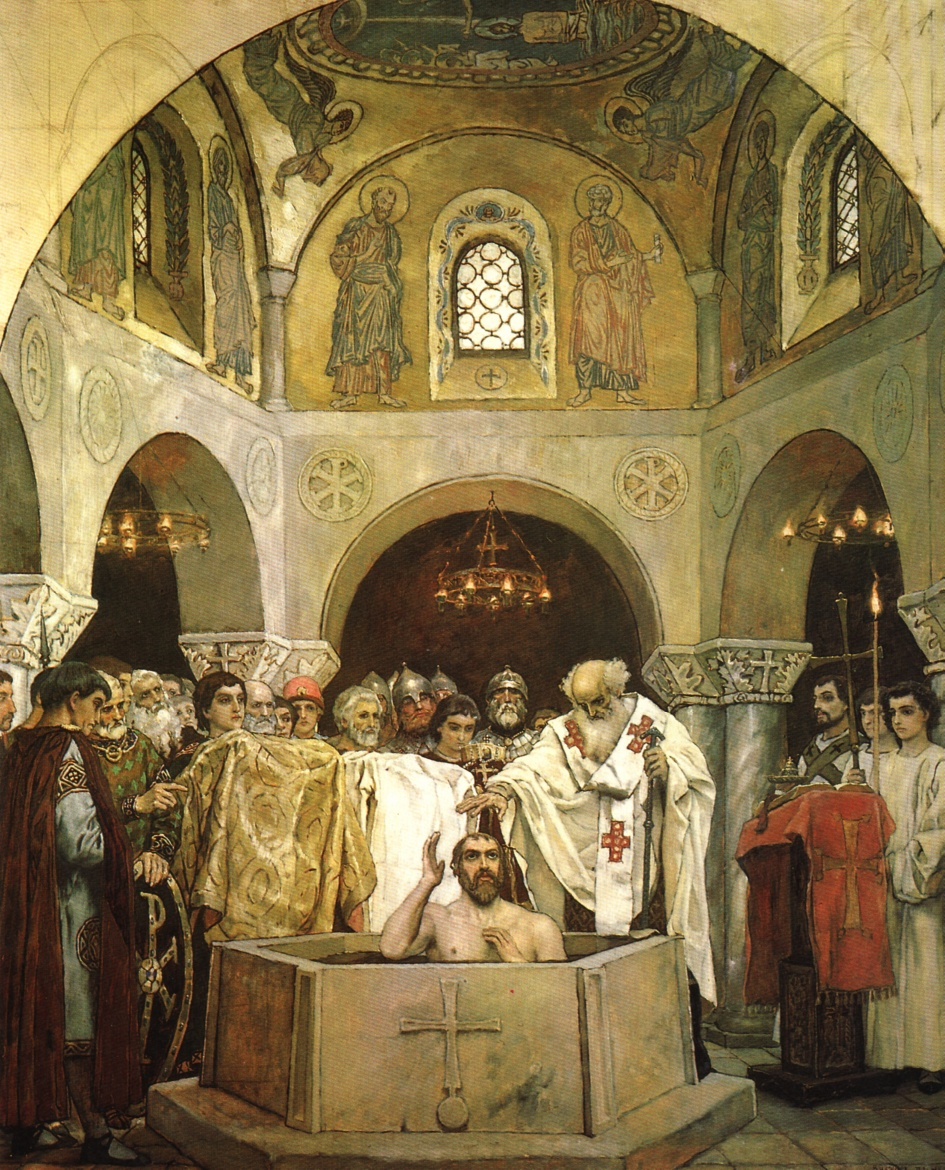
The Baptism of Saint Prince Vladimir, by Viktor Vasnetsov (1890)

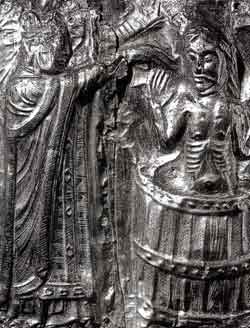
Harald being baptized by Poppo the monk, probably c. 960

== 11th century ==
- Olof Skötkonung, King of Sweden (1008)

== 14th century ==
- Jogaila, Grand Duke of Lithuania and King of Poland (1386)

== 16th century ==
- Nzinga of Ndongo and Matamba
- Afonso I of Kongo
- Humabon, Rajah of Cebu (1521)
- Bunao Lakan Dula, Lakan of Tondo (c. 1571)
- Rajah Matanda of Maynila (1572)
- Ōtomo Sōrin (although not a direct royalty, Japanese daimyo were de facto independent rulers of their territories)
- Arima Harunobu
- Ōmura Sumitada

== 19th century ==
- Hone Heke
- Keopuolani
- Ka'ahumanu
- Kamehameha III
- Tamati Waka Nene
- Ranavalona II of Madagascar
- Pomare II
- Duleep Singh
