= Óengus mac Nad Froích =

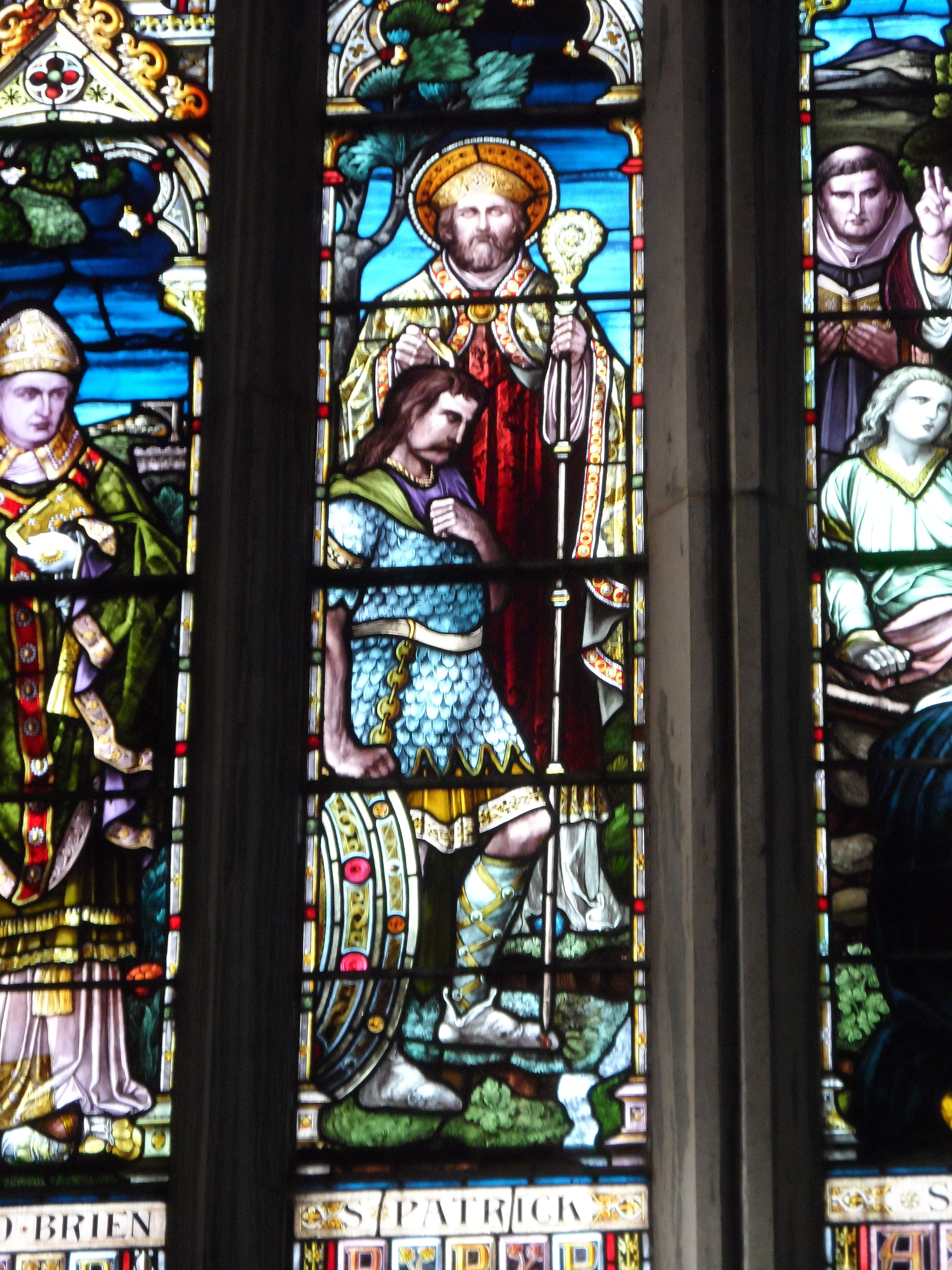
Baptism of Óengus by Saint Patrick, stained glass, St Ailbe's Church, Emly.

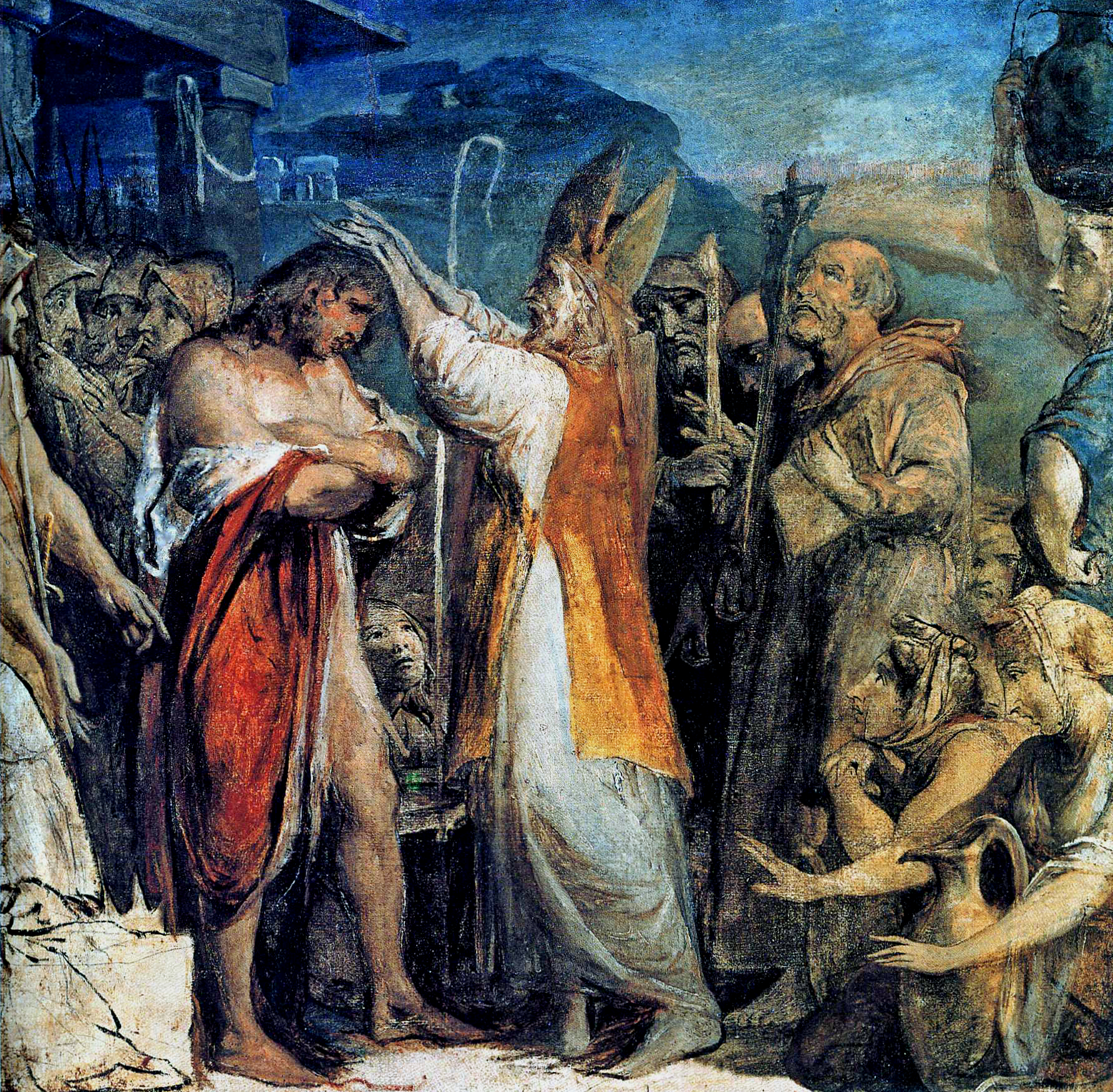
The Baptism of the King of Cashel by St Patrick, painted by James Barry, c. 1780s. The conversion of Óengus mac Nad Froích moved Munster towards Christianity.

Óengus mac Nad Froích (430-489) was an Eoganachta, an Irish clan originating in Cashel and the first Christian King of Munster. He was the son of Nad Froich mac Cuirc by Faochan, a British lady (called daughter of the King of Britain).

== Biography ==
Óengus mac Nad Froích was born in 430 the son of Nad Froich mac Cuirc by Faochan, a British lady (called daughter of the King of Britain). In Geoffrey Keating's History of Ireland, Oengus is given a reign as King of Munster of 36 years, which would place the start of his reign as early as 453.

He was baptized a Christian in the royal seat of Cashel by Saint Patrick himself. St Patrick baptized him in blood by driving his crozier through the king's foot. The king became very devout and surrounded himself with clerics. He imposed a baptismal tax on the Christian converts of Munster for St. Patrick.

Óengus appears in the 9th-century literary text The Expulsion of the Déisi, in which he grants land to the wandering Déisi horde. However the story is set in the time of Cormac mac Airt, who is said to have lived 200 years before Óengus. Óengus appears often in the varying vitae of St. Ciarán of Saigir as a major patron of the saint.

Óengus was married to Eithni Uathach ingen Cremthainn, called "the hateful". She was a member of the Uí Cheinnselaig sept of the Laigin. Keating mentioned that half of Oengus´ numerous progeny were "given" into the church.

In 489, the battle of Cenn Losnada in Mag Fea was fought, in which he and his wife were slain. The victors included Iollann mac Dunlaing, and Oilill, his brother of the Uí Dúnlainge sept of Laigin, and Eochaidh Guinech of the Uí Bairrche sept of Laigin, and, according to the Annals of Tigernach, Muirchertach Mac Ercae, the Ui Neill king of Ailech. Óengus' head was given to Iollan.

== Issue ==
He was the ancestor of three major septs of the Eóganacht including the Cashel, Arithir Cliach, and Glendamnach lines.

- Feidlimid mac Óengusa, King of Munster (ancestor of the Eóganacht Chaisil)
- Eochaid mac Óengusa, King of Munster (ancestor of the Eóganacht Glendamnach and Airthir Cliach)
- Dub-Gilcach mac Óengusso, Prince of Munster
- Uichtdhealdh, Queen of Connacht (married Ailill Molt)
- St. Kessog of Luss
- St. Fáelán of Strathearn
- Ousilla, according to legend the Queen of Kernow, AKA Isolde.

== See also ==
- List of rulers who converted to Christianity

Óengus mac Nad Froích Eóganachta
Regnal titles
Preceded by Nad Froich mac Cuirc	King of Cashel c. 453 – 489	Succeeded by Feidlimid mac Óengusa
