= Lusk, County Dublin =

Town in north County Dublin, Ireland

Lusk Lusca (Irish)
- Town
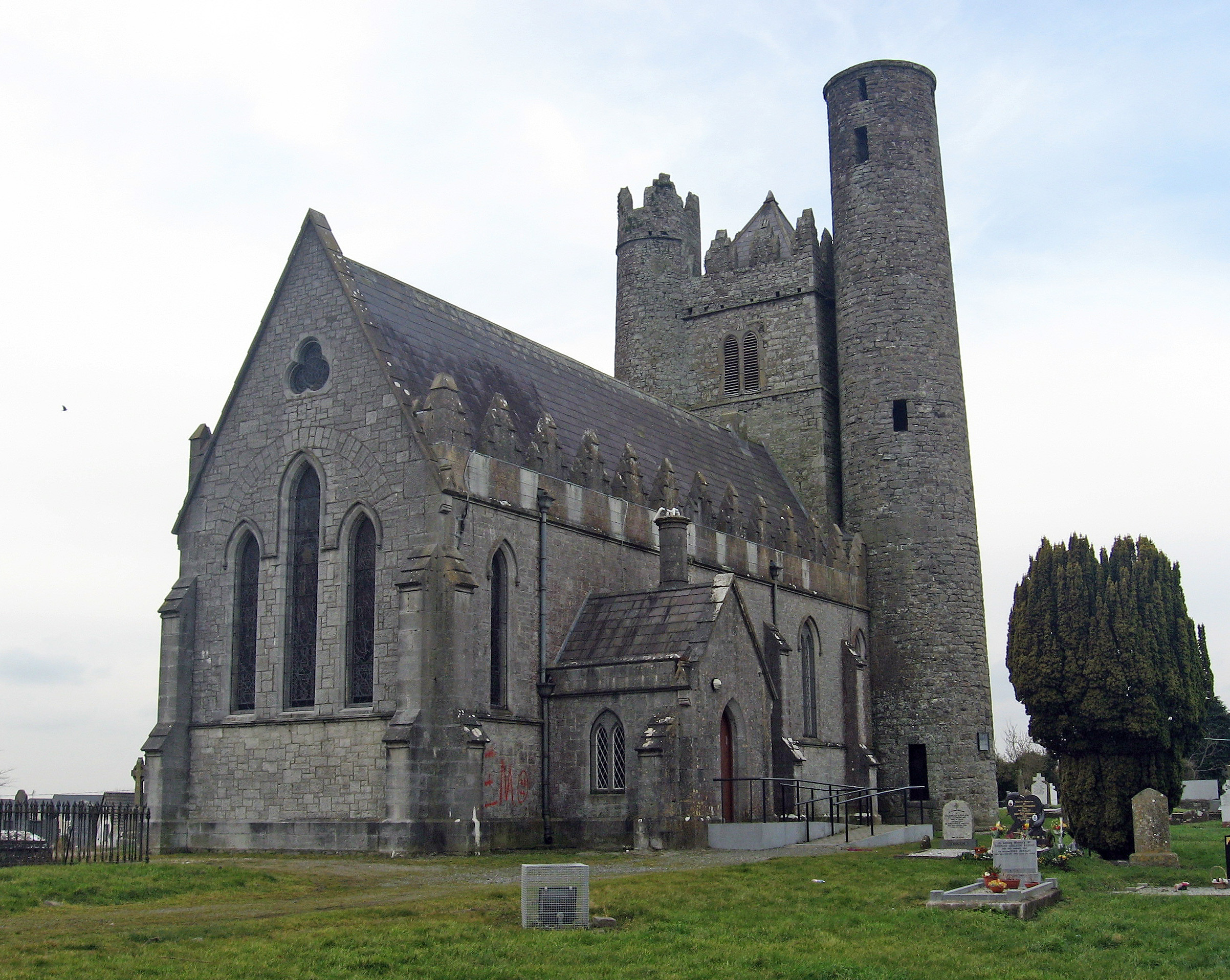
- Church of Ireland and round tower at Lusk

- Location in Ireland
- Coordinates: 53.526°N 6.167°W
- Country: Ireland
- Province: Leinster
- County: County Dublin
- Local government area: Fingal
- Elevation: 25 m (82 ft)

Population (2022)
  - Total: 8,806
- Time zone: UTC±0 (WET)
  - Summer (DST): UTC+1 (IST)
- Eircode routing key: K45
- Telephone area code: +353(0)1
- Irish Grid Reference: R746888

Lusk (Irish: Lusca) is a town in County Dublin, Ireland. Sometimes described as a village, Lusk is located about 20 km (12 mi) north of Dublin city centre. Lusk is in a townland and civil parish of the same name, in the barony of Balrothery East. As of the 2022 census, Lusk had a population of 8,806. It is in the Fingal local government area.

== Toponymy ==
The name "Lusk" is said to date back to Saint MacCullin, who founded a church there c. 450. Oral tradition suggests MacCullin may have either lived in or been buried in a cave and that the name "Lusk" derives from an old Irish word Lusca meaning 'cave' or 'underground chamber'. MacCullin died in c. 497 and his feast day was 6 September. The area was known as Bregia in pre-Christian times and was said to have been the birthplace of Cú Chulainn's wife, Emer in Irish mythology.

== History ==
The settlement of Lusk has been associated with St. MacCullin since c. AD 450. The place also had associations with St. Maur, who nowadays connects with Rush (RosEo). The ruins of St. Maur's original church, or more likely its later replacement, are at the top of Whitestown hill, firmly in the parish of Rush. Lusk was plundered and burned several times in the 8th and 9th centuries by marauding Vikings, who eventually built a permanent settlement at Dubh Linn, now Dublin.

Findings of cist burials during the Neolithic Era in Ireland continue to be rediscovered throughout modern times in Lusk. During the Irish Bronze Age, the concept of multiple human burials was commonly recognized throughout the Middle Ages. The metrical design of each individual cist, varies from county to county along different grave sites. The construction of each cist depended on what it contained whether it was cremated bodies or unburned skeletons. Along with partial bone remains, artifacts like flint arrowheads have been found, reflecting the prominence of hunting tools during the Irish Bronze Age.

The only tangible remnant of the early Christian foundation at Lusk is the round tower. It is adjacent to a Norman square tower built against it in the 15th century. This building has three matching (smaller) towers at its corners. The square tower holds several medieval tombs including that of James Bermingham (1527) and the double-effigy tomb of Christopher Barnewall and his wife Marion Sherle (1589). The Church of Ireland church dates from 1847 by Joseph Welland and was designed in an Early English Gothic style. While standing on the right side of the castle looking up one of the bricks in the building has a stone image of St. Macullin's face.

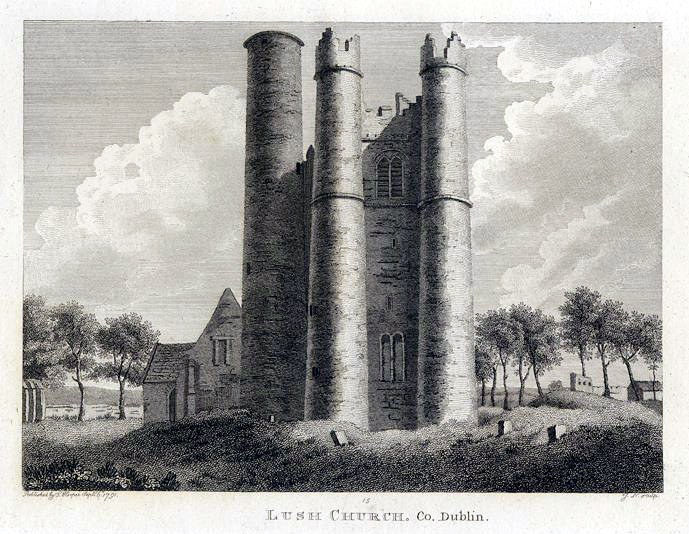
View from 1791

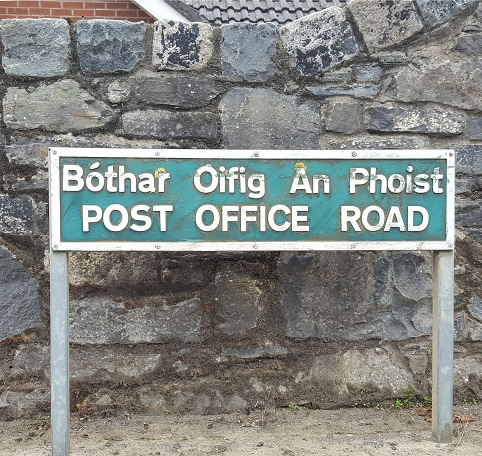
Post Office Road, off Skerries Road, in Lusk

The round tower at Lusk was built in the 10th or 11th century. It stands 27 m high (originally nearly 32 m high). Inside are nine storeys including the basement making it the highest number of any round tower. Each floor is lit by single-lintelled windows which vary in size. Two of these windows have been blocked up where they face unto the wall of the belfry. Just under the cap, there are 4 windows facing the cardinal points. They are quite small and narrow. The original conical cap has been replaced by a flat timber roof. The flat-headed doorway, which originally would have been some 2.6 m above the ground level is now less than 1 m above the ground.

Fingal is the name given to that part of present-day north County Dublin bounded by the Tolka River to the south and the Delvin River to the north. Fingal is considerably older than Dublin City, which was established by the Norsemen c. 900 AD around the 'dubh linn' or black pool. Before Christendom and St. MacCullin, the area was the Celtic "Bregia", the birthplace of Cú Chullain's wife, Emer whose clan resided in or near what we now know as Lusk.

Lusca Irish Wine named after the Irish for Lusk, by Llewellyns Orchard, is one of the few Irish wine producers using grapes grown in Ireland.

On 26 May 2005, there was an attempted armed robbery of Lusk Post office. During this attempted robbery two gang members were shot dead by gardaí. The total incident lasted 20 seconds. In 2007 a third gang member was given a 10-year jail sentence for his role in the deadly raid.

To facilitate the increased population in this part of north county Dublin a new, larger, state-of-the-art post office was opened in 2016. The license was transferred from the early 20th-century post office on Post Office Road to the new facilities on Station Road.

== Population ==
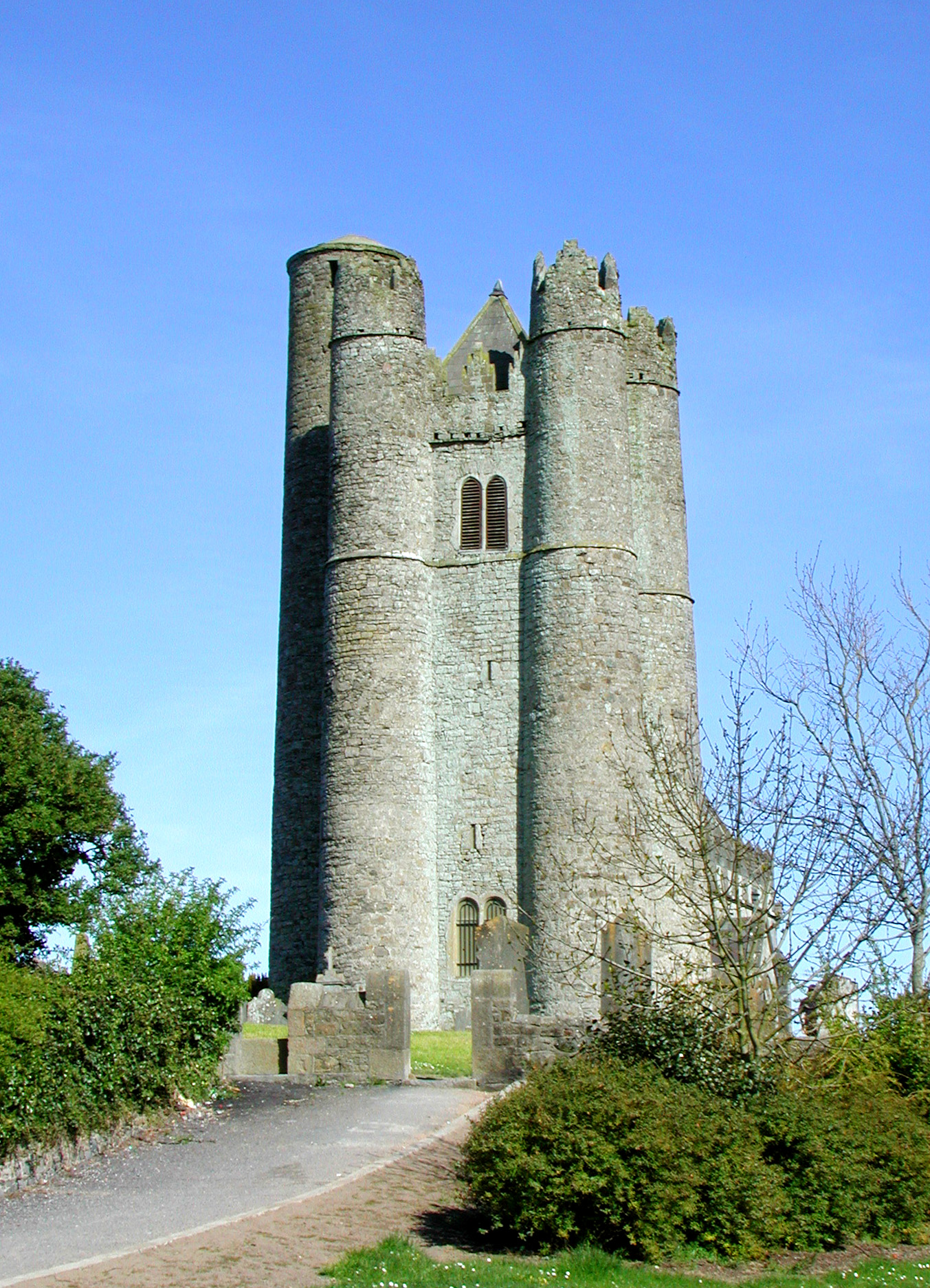
St Macuilin's Church, Church Road

During most of the 20th century, the population remained fairly static. Census returns for 1901 and 1911 show a population boom from about 300 to 600. Figures are available for Lusk from the early 1950s that show a population of 513 for the village. Due to massive emigration in Ireland throughout the 1950s and 1960s the population of Lusk declined. In the mid-1950s for instance, the total number of children in the old NS, boys and girls, was never higher than 120. The National School opened in 1956 with that number. This primary school was replaced in 2018. The new building is located slightly north of the site of the former 1950s building, which was demolished to allow construction.

The population of the village increased almost four-fold from the turn of the 21st century, growing from 2,456 in 2002 to 8,806 by the 2022 census. According to the Central Statistics Office, 62% of all private dwellings in Lusk were built in the five years between 2001 and 2006. Census figures for the same period show a doubling of population, from c. 2,500 to over 5,200. This growth was among the highest for any census town, with an existing population of over 2,000, anywhere in Ireland.

== Amenities ==
There are four national schools in the area: Lusk NS, Hedgestown NS, Corduff NS and Rush and Lusk Educate Together NS. In August 2013 these were complemented by a secondary-level education institute, Lusk Community College. The Educate Together school was the subject of adverse findings on fire safety in 2015, concluding that the building was secure for only 20 minutes in the event of fire, rather than the required 60 minutes, and over 800,000 euro of works had to be done. Problems later arose with other schools built by the same firm, Western Building Systems. There were two overriding concerns that prompted a public backlash: the lack of cavity barriers in walls and the non-existence of special intumescent paint.

Lusk Community Council Ltd (LCC) was set up to look after the village and liaise with local government and councillors. LCC is a voluntary organisation whose responsibility has been to manage the Carnegie Library hall and the Old Church Hall by the round tower. They also run the St Patrick's Day parade each year. In October 2022, LCC opened Lusk Community Cultural Centre adjacent to the site of the round tower. It is a complete renovation of what was once Katie Hunts cottage and shop.

The village is home to several different social clubs and amenities, including Lusk Community Cultural Centre, Lusk United AFC (soccer club), the Round Towers GAA club, a branch of the Irish Countrywomen's Association, an athletics club, and local heritage group. Lusk parish has a tidy towns committee.

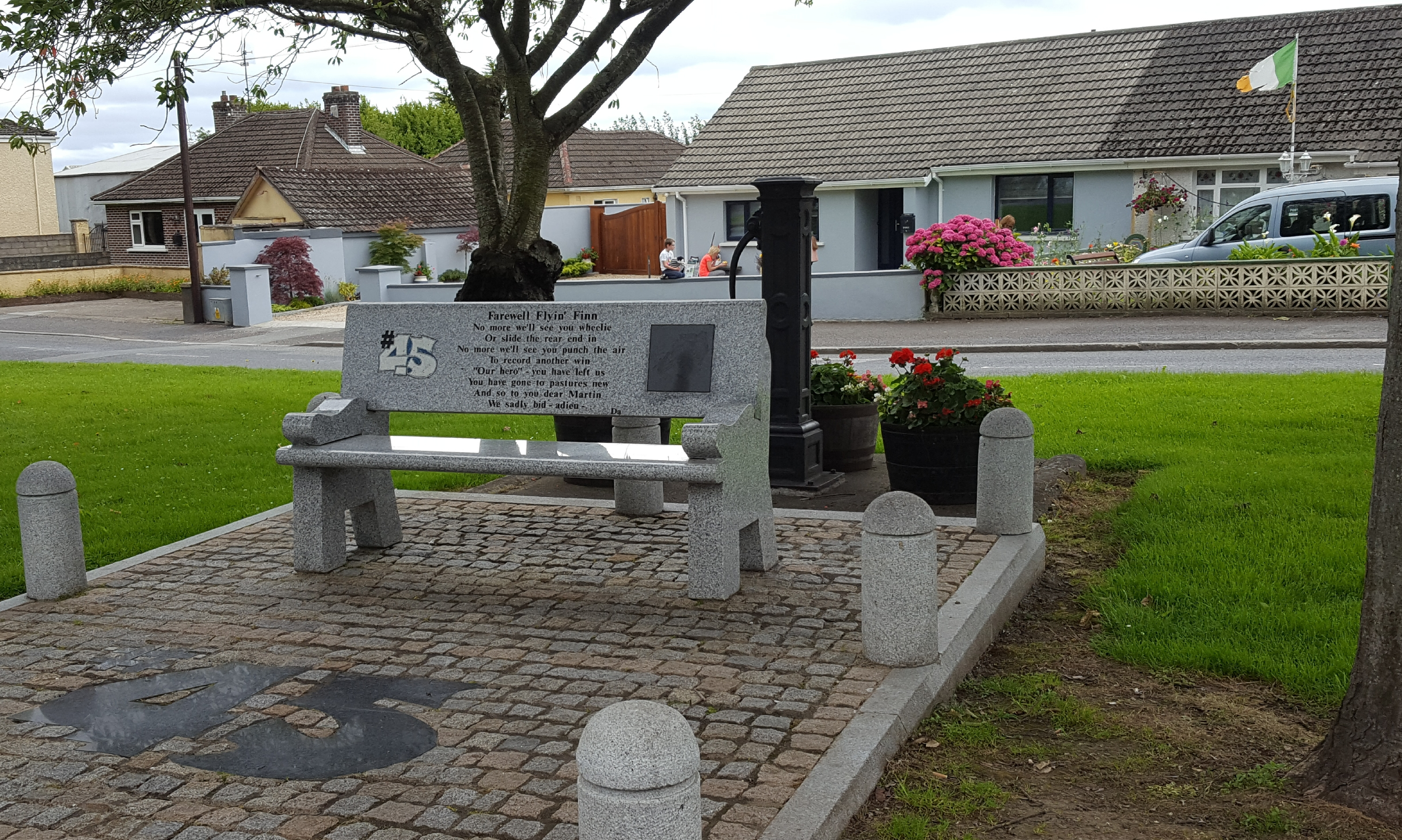
Martin Finnegan Memorial, Lusk

Lusk is home to a number of road motorbike races, with major annual motorcycle road races, such as the Skerries 100 and Killalane Road Races, in the area. A well-known road racer from the area, Martin Finnegan was killed in a tragic accident at the Tandragee 100. A memorial to Martin Finnegan was dedicated close to the grounds of his parish church. Also in his memory, the Martin Finnegan Trophy is awarded to the fastest lap by an Irishman at the Isle of Man TT.

== Religion ==
St. MacCullin's Catholic Church serves as the parish church for the locality. St. MacCullins Church of Ireland parish of Lusk is now grouped for administrative purposes with St. Columba's of Swords.

An early representation of Christianity within Ireland was found in an unearthed monument, or tombstone, in the Church of Lusk in 1753. The design of the monument resembled the Trinity, specifically alluding to the Messiah (Christ) through the design of two open hands. The stone was five foot five inches in length, two foot two inches in width, and five inches in volume. This was a metaphorical depiction of reverence and honor for the power of God as well as the relationship between God and man. These palms recognized the power and presence of God on behalf of earthly affairs. There were similarities between Egyptian hieroglyphics and Irish symbols, especially with the idea of the hand or palm.

== Transport ==
Rush and Lusk railway station is about 2 km east and is shared with the coastal settlement of Rush.

The Dublin Bus routes 33, 33a (taken over by Go-Ahead Ireland in December 2018) and 33x also run through the area.

Fingal Express is a privately owned coach service from Skerries, Rush and Lusk to Dublin City Centre and UCD.

== Twinning ==
Lusk is twinned with Thorigné-Fouillard located in Brittany, France. The twinning process was completed on 2 May 1993. On 27 April 2011, a delegation of 27 visitors from the Breton region arrived in Lusk and was greeted by the Mayor of Fingal, Cllr Ken Farrell.

== Wildlife ==
An orchard in Lusk was used as an occupation for homemade test tubes on behalf of stem-nesting bees and wasps in the area. From March to September in 2021, a range of four species of Hymenoptera bees emerged from attempts to utilize "bee hotels". By doing so, researchers sought to widen the opportunities of natural reproduction for insects needing hollow heights.

== See also ==
- List of abbeys and priories in Ireland (County Dublin)
- List of towns and villages in Ireland
