= Eógan mac Néill =

King of Ailech

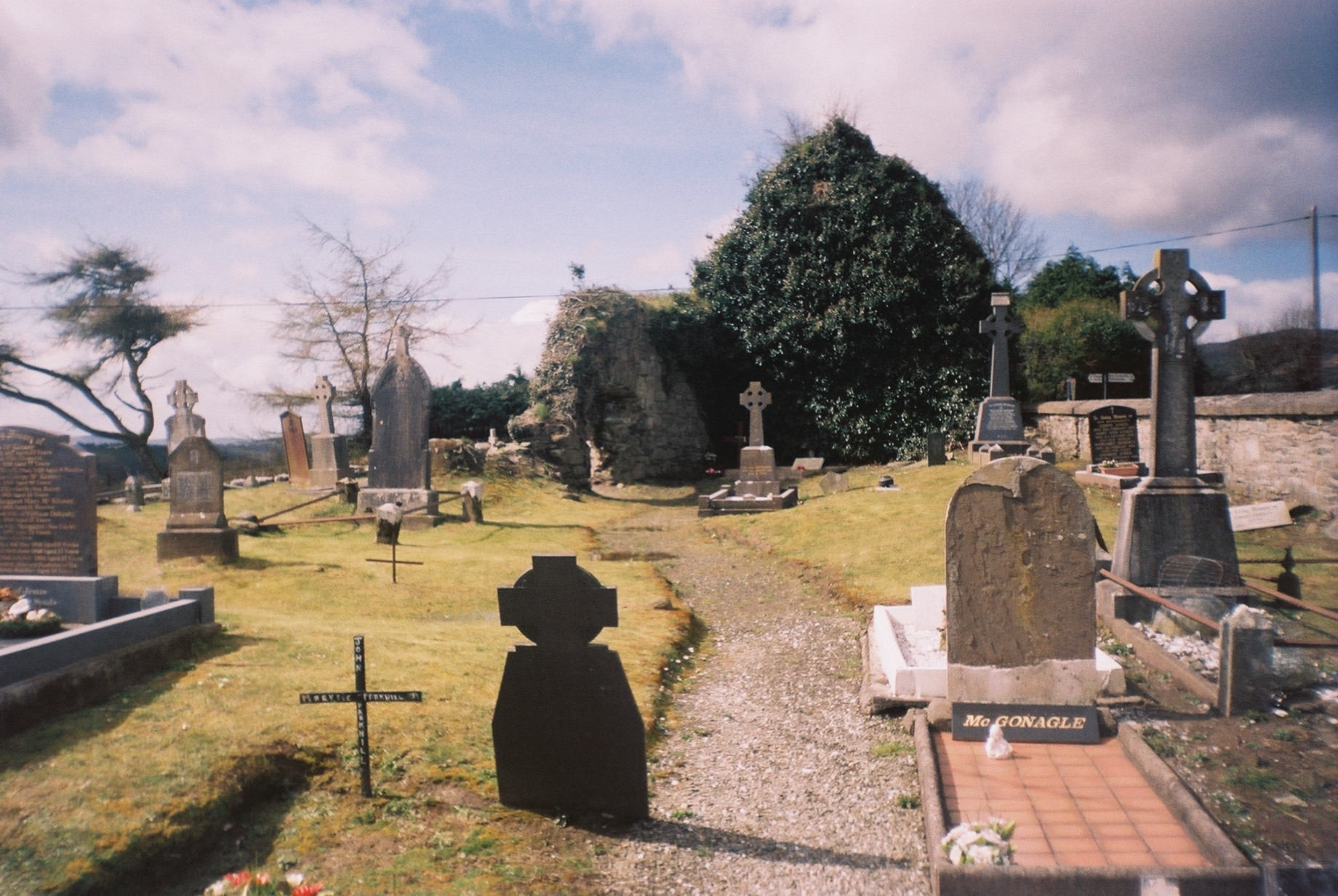
The old graveyard and the ruined church in Eskaheen—the resting place of Eógan mac Néill

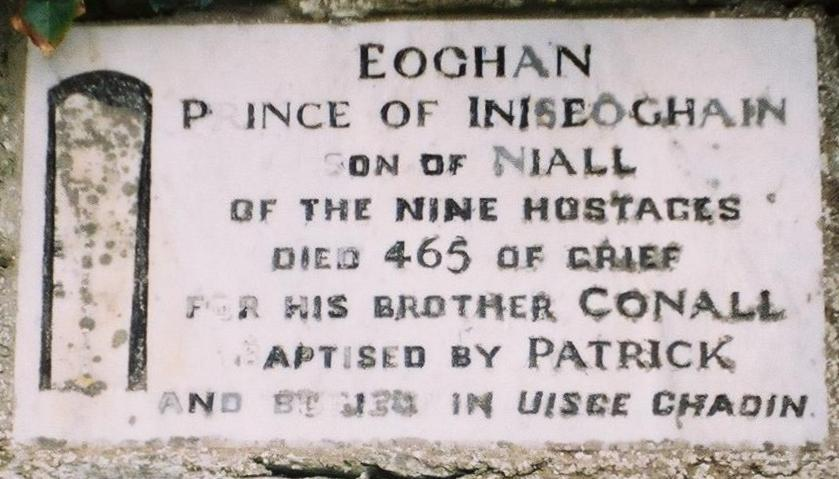
The plaque marking the reputed burial place of Eógan mac Néill

Eógan mac Néill (Modern Irish: Eoghan mac Néill; reportedly died in 465) was a son of Niall Noígiallach and the eponymous ancestor of the Cenél nEógain (kindred of Eoghan) branch of the Northern Uí Néill. (Note: The manuscript known as the Laud 610 Genealogies (Oxford, Bodleian Library MS. Laud 610, fo. 75a 1, fifteenth century) gives seven descendant clans of the Cenél nEogain, in the Bredach.) The Cenél Eoghan would found the over-kingdom of Ailech and later Tír Eoghain, which would span the greater part of Ulster. His burial place is said to be in the Inishowen Peninsula in County Donegal, Ireland which was named after him. The historical accuracy or existence of Eógan and his father, however, are unknown.

== Overview ==
Eogan mac Néill is claimed as having been a close friend of Saint Patrick and received Patrick's blessing. With his brother, the High King Lóegaire mac Néill (d. 462), he was one of the judges in a dispute over the succession to Amalgaid (d. 440), king of Connacht, among his sons competing to rule their territory of Tir Amalgaidh in north-west Connacht.

Eoghan is reputedly buried at St. Patrick's Church in Iskaheen, Inishowen, Donegal. A plaque there states, "Eoghan Prince of Inis Eóghain, Son of Niall of the Nine Hostages. Died 465 of grief for his brother Conall [Gulban]. Baptised by Patrick and buried in Uisce Chaoin".

His sons included Muiredach mac Eógain, Fergus mac Eógain, founder of the Cenél Fergusa, and Anghusa mac Eógain, founder of the Cenél Anghusa.

== Sources ==
- Annals of Ulster at CELT: Corpus of Electronic Texts at University College Cork.
- Byrne, Francis John (2001), Irish Kings and High-Kings, Dublin: Four Courts Press. ISBN 978-1-85182-196-9
- Revised edition of McCarthy's synchronisms at Trinity College Dublin.
