= Eochaid mac Óengusa =

Eochaid mac Óengusa (died 522) was a King of Munster from the ruling Eoganachta dynasty. He was the son of Óengus mac Nad Froích (died 489), the first Christian king of Munster.

The chronology of the 6th century Munster kings is confusing in the sources. According to the Laud Synchronisms, he succeeded his father as king and was a contemporary of the high king Lugaid mac Lóegairi which would place the start of his reign before 507. However, in the Book of Leinster, he succeeded his brother Feidlimid mac Óengusa.

He had two sons born on the same night: Crimthann Srem (Feimin), ancestor of the Glendamnach sept (Glanworth, County Cork) of Eoganachta and another Crimthann by a woman named Dearcon (possibly of the Arada Cliach), ancestor of the Arithir Cliach sept (Tipperary town area) of Eoganachta. it is possible that the creation of two separate Crimthanns was an invention of the genealogists. He was succeeded by his son Crimthann Srem mac Echado.

Eochaid mac Óengusa Eóganachta
Regnal titles
Preceded by Feidlimid mac Óengusa	King of Cashel c. 500 – 522	Succeeded by Crimthann Srem mac Echado

.

== See also ==
- Kings of Munster
