= Áilgenán mac Donngaile =

Áilgenán mac Donngaile (died 853) was a King of Munster from the Eóganacht Chaisil branch of the Eoganachta, the ruling dynasty of Munster. He was of the Clann Faílbe sept of this branch and a grandson of Tnúthgal mac Donngaile (died 820), whom some sources name as King of Munster. His branch of the ruling dynasty had their lands in the Cashel area of Tipperary County. He reigned from 852 to 853.

The Danes had arrived in Ireland in 849 and took control of Dublin in 851. The dispersed Norse went off to plunder different areas of Ireland and a rivalry began between these two Viking groups with Irish kings using this rivalry in their own conflicts. The Fragmentary Annals record two defeats of the Norse Vikings by Munster groups in the year 852, though the dating is uncertain. The Arada Cliach of Cliu (east county Limerick) defeated the Norse and the Ciarraige won a victory over the Norse at Belach Conglais, near Cork.

After the death of Áilgenán in 853 there was an interregnum until the succession of his brother Máel Gualae mac Donngaile (died 859) in 856. Áilgenán's great-grandson, Fer Gráid mac Clérig (died 961) was also a King of Munster.
