= Eóganacht Chaisil =

Branch of the ruling dynasty of Munster

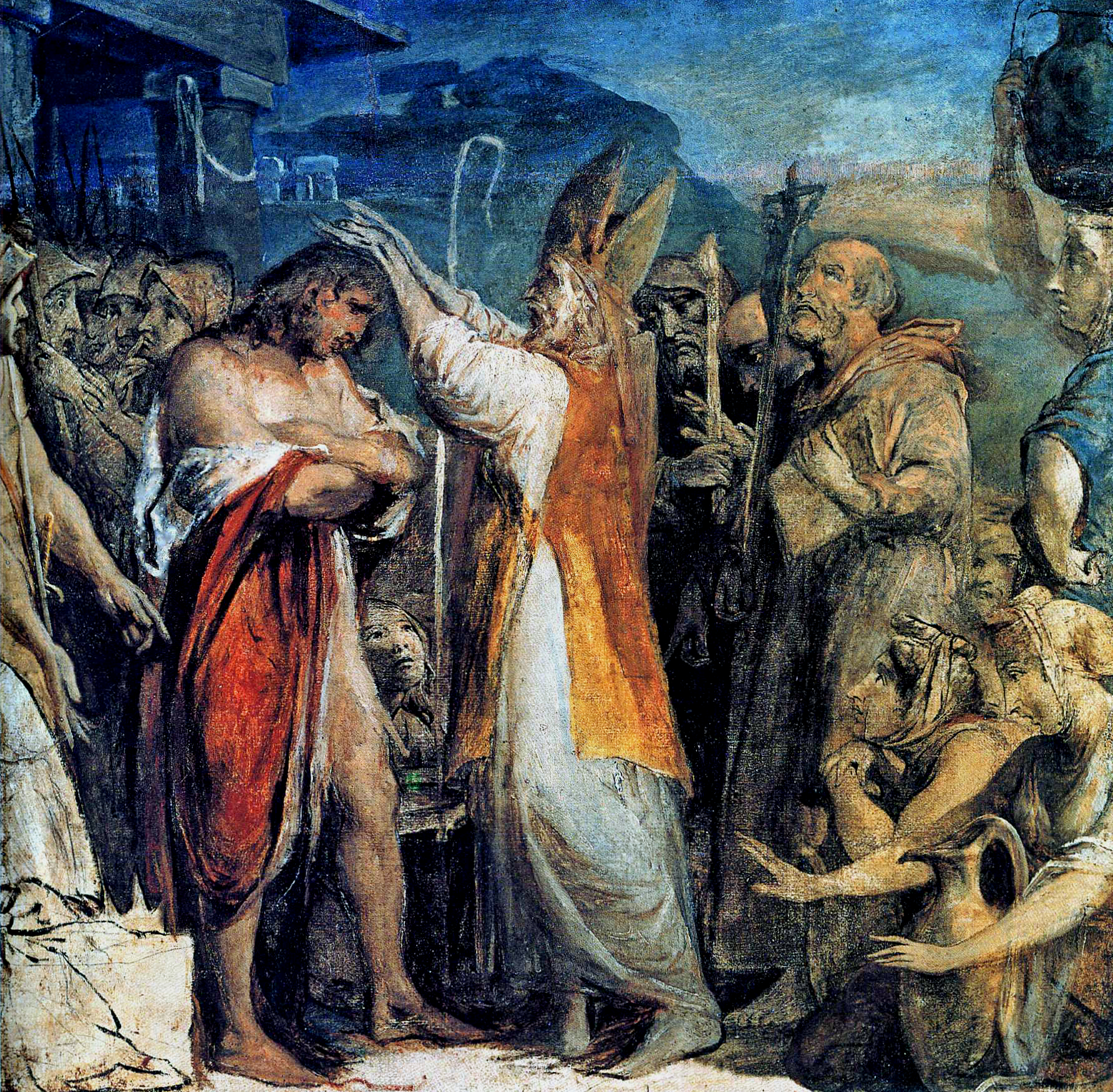
The Baptism of the King of Cashel by St Patrick, painted by James Barry, c. 1780s. Óengus mac Nad Froích was the progenitor of the Eóganacht Chaisil.

Eóganacht Chaisil were a branch of the Eóganachta, the ruling dynasty of Munster between the 5th and 10th centuries. They took their name from Cashel (County Tipperary) which was the capital of the early Catholic kingdom of Munster. They were descended from Óengus mac Nad Froích (died 489), the first Christian King of Munster, through his son Feidlimid mac Óengusa.

In the seventh century, they split into two main clans. Cenél Fíngin descended from Fíngen mac Áedo Duib (d. 618) and became the O'Sullivans and MacGillycuddys. The McGillycuddy are a sept of the O'Sullivan's. A descendant of Fíngen was Feidlimid mac Cremthanin (d. 847). Clann Faílbe descended from Faílbe Flann mac Áedo Duib (d. 639) and became the MacCarthy dynasty, rulers of the Kingdom of Desmond following their displacement by the Normans. The O'Callaghans belong to the same line as the MacCarthys, while the MacAuliffes are a sept of the MacCarthys.

The Eóganacht Chaisil were considered part of the inner circle of Eoganachta dynasties which included the Eóganacht Glendamnach and Eóganacht Áine branches. These three branches rotated the kingship of Munster in the 7th and much of the 8th centuries. The Chaisil branch provided most of the kings in the 9th and 10th centuries in Munster. Kings of Cashel and Munster from the Eóganacht Chaisil were:

== Kings of Eóganacht Chaisil ==
- Fíngen mac Áedo Duib, d. 618
- Faílbe Flann mac Áedo Duib, d. 639
- Máenach mac Fíngin, d. 661
- Colgú mac Faílbe Flaind, d. 678
- Cormac mac Ailello, d. 712
- Tnúthgal mac Donngaile, d. 820
- Feidlimid mac Cremthanin, d. 847
- Áilgenán mac Donngaile, d. 853
- Máel Gualae, d. 859
- Cormac mac Cuilennáin, d. 908
- Cellachán Caisil, d. 954
- Donnchad mac Cellacháin, d. 963

== Annalistic references ==
See Annals of Inisfallen (AI)

- AI954.2 Repose of Dub Inse, learned bishop of Ireland, and of Cellachán, king of Caisel, and of Éladach the learned, abbot of Ros Ailithir, and of Uarach, bishop of Imlech Ibuir, and of Célechair, abbot of Cluain Moccu Nóis and Cluain Iraird, and of Cormac Ua Maíl Shluaig, learned sage of Mumu, and of Lugaid Ua Maíl Shempail, abbot of Domnach Pátraic, and of Cenn Faelad son of Suibne, anchorite of Cluain Ferta Brénainn.
