= Feidlimid mac Óengusa =

Feidlimid mac Óengusa (455-500), or Feidlimid Dub, was an Eoganachta King of Munster in the early 6th century. He was the son of Óengus mac Nad Froích, the first Christian king of Munster.

The chronology of the 6th-century kings of Munster in the sources is confusing and Feidlimid is only known from king lists. Not mentioned as king in the Laud Synchronisms or the Irish annals; he is however mentioned in the Book of Leinster as successor to his father and predecessor of his brother Eochaid mac Óengusa. This puts his reign around the year 500. However, in the saga Senchas Fagbála Caisil ("The Story of the Finding of Cashel"), he is listed after his brother which would put his reign around 525. the Laud Synchronisms were written in the interest of the Glendamnach branch and this may explain the exclusion of Feidlimid from it.

He was the ancestor of the Eóganacht Chaisil branch of the family with lands around Cashel in County Tipperary. His son's name was Crimthann. In a tract regarding a Munster synod in the 6th century, his son Crimthan is considered King of Munster. However, his mother is called Dearcon who is usually associated with Crimthan, the son of Eochaid mac Óengusa and founder of the Airthir Cliach branch. His great-grandsons Fíngen mac Áedo Duib (died 618) and Faílbe Flann mac Áedo Duib (died 639) were also Kings of Munster.

Feidlimid mac Óengusa Eóganachta
Regnal titles
Preceded by Óengus mac Nad Froích	King of Cashel c. 489 – 500	Succeeded by Eochaid mac Óengusa
