= St Ailbe's Church =

- St Ailbe's Church
- Eaglais Naomh Ailbe
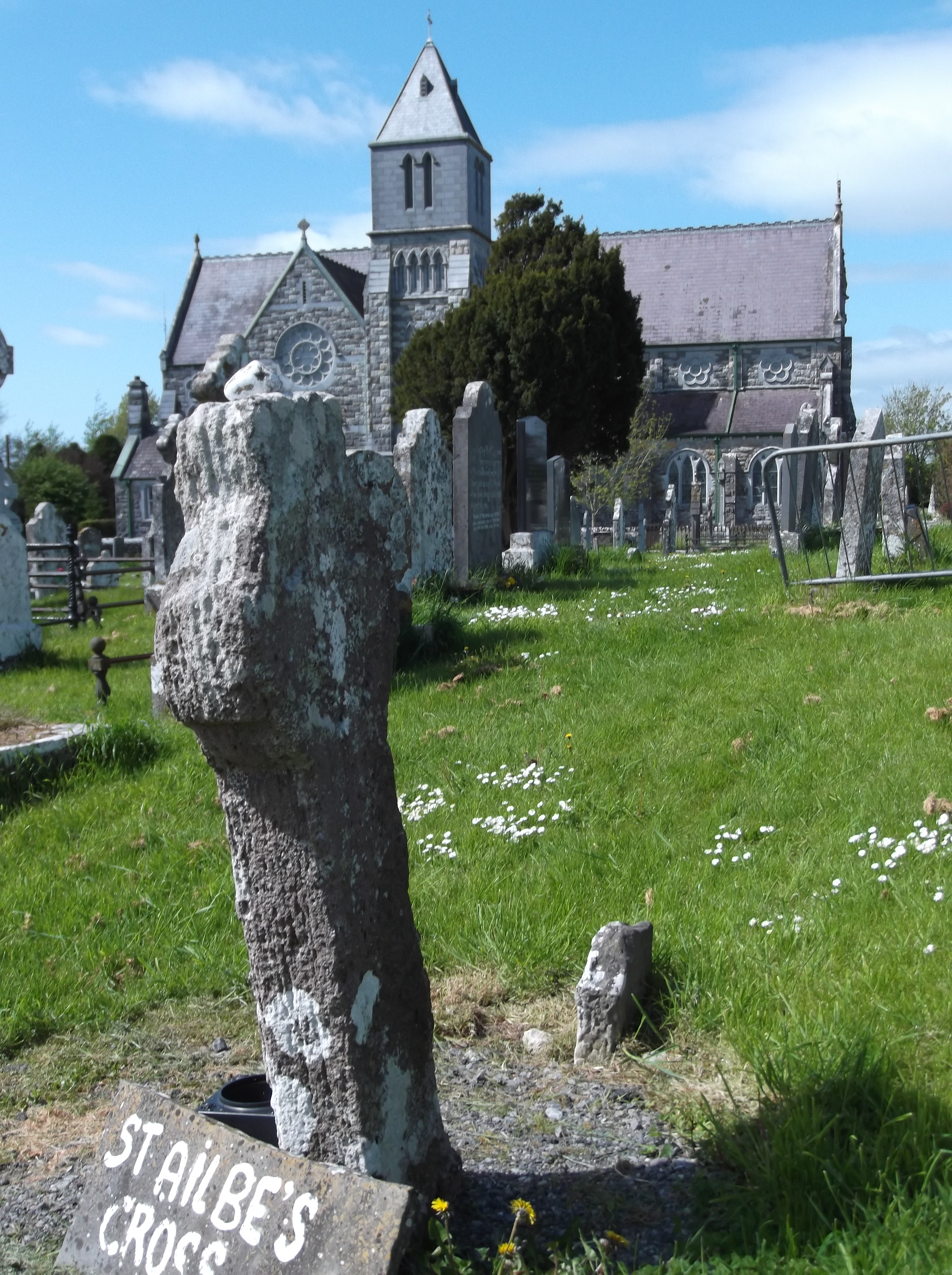
- Cross and Church of St Ailbe

- Location within Ireland
- 52.463155°N 8.351851°W
- Location: Main Street, Emly, County Tipperary
- Country: Ireland
- Denomination: Catholic

History
- Status: Parish church
- Dedication: Ailbe of Emly

Architecture
- Functional status: Active
- Style: Gothic Revival
- Years built: 1880–82

Specifications
- Materials: Limestone, ashlar

Administration
- Archdiocese: Cashel and Emly
- Diocese: Cashel and Emly
- Parish: Emly

St Ailbe's Church is a Catholic church in Emly County Tipperary, Ireland, dedicated to Ailbe of Emly (d. 529). Built in the 1880s, it replaced an 1809 church. The sandstone font at the entrance is believed to be medieval, and the nearby graveyard features St Ailbe's Cross, reputedly the saint's tombstone.
