= Macculind =

Irish saint (died 496)

Saint Macculind
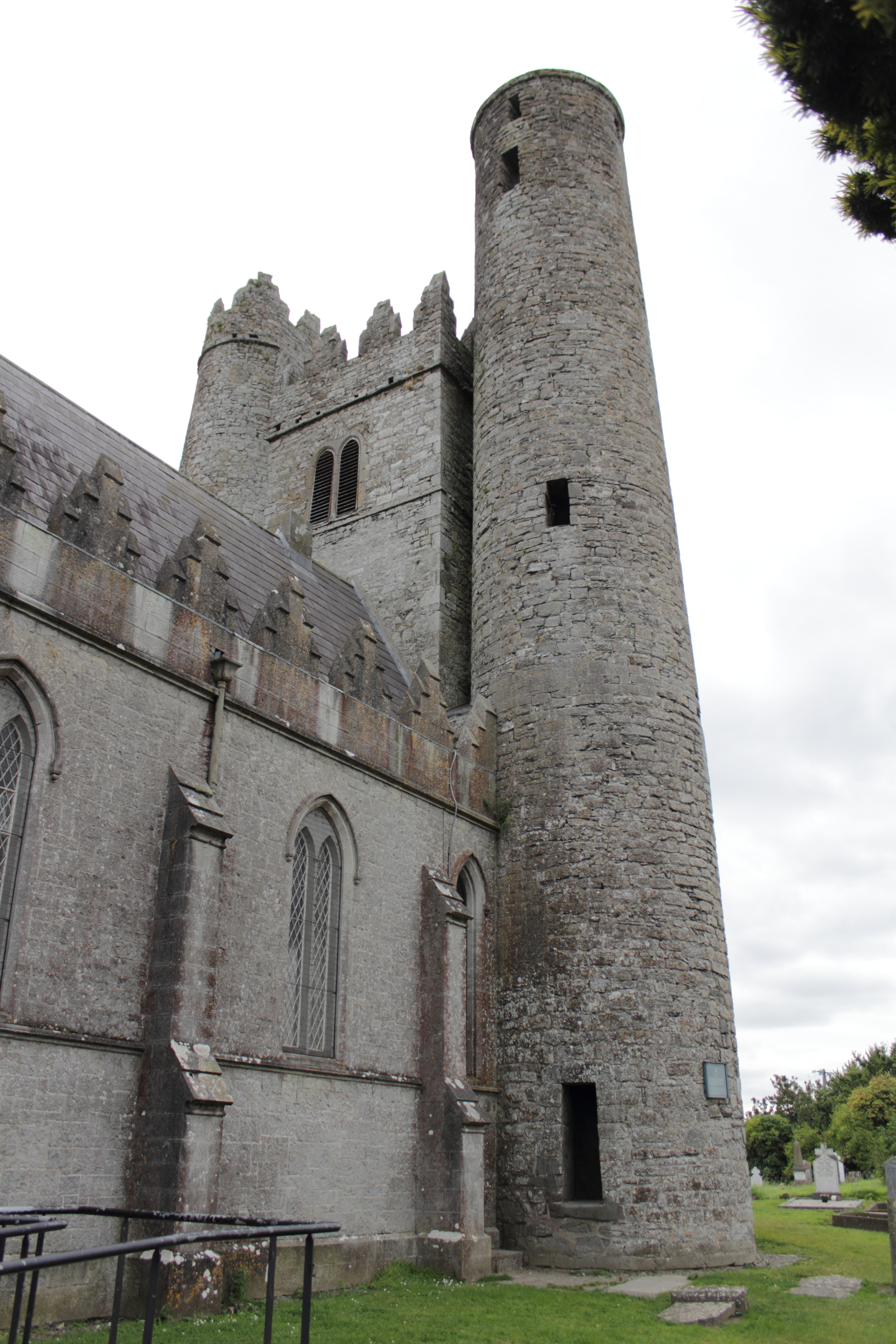
- Round Tower beside the church in Lusk

Abbot and / or Bishop of Lusk
- Residence: Lusk, County Dublin
- Died: 496
- Feast: 6 September

Saint Macculind (or Macallan, MacCuilinn, Macculin Dus, Maculinus; died c. 496) was an early Irish saint who was abbot and / or bishop of Lusk.

== Life ==
John O'Hanlon notes in his Lives of the Irish saints (1873), "Much confusion exists in the documents and traditions which remain, regarding the time when the patron saint of Lusk flourished...". The O'Clerys claim that he was descended from the race of Tadhg, son to Cian, son of Oilill Olum, King of Munster (died 234). Some writers say the saint was the son of Cathmoga or Cathbad, but based on his name his father was probably a man named Cullin. His first name was said to be Cainnigh, Caindigh or Caindedh.

Macculind did much to found churches and monasteries. He left Leinster to become a disciple of Saint Gregory (Note: Saint Gregory was probably the locally celebrated Gregory of the Golden month, venerated along the south-western and western shores of Ireland.) in the district of "Carbrinum", (Note: Probably "Carbrinum" should read "Carbreum", or "Carbry". There is more than one Carbry in the south and west of Ireland.) under whom he studied theology and scripture. He is reported to have worked various miracles, both in Ireland and during a visit to Scotland. He is also said to have visited Rome, where Pope Gregory (Note: The first pope named Gregory ruled from 590 to 604, which is inconsistent with Macculind's death in 496.) made him a bishop and then directed him to return to his province. He went to a town named Durpconyle, where he founded a monastery, and he also founded a monastery named Albamene, and is said to have founded twelve monasteries in all.

At some point Macculind became bishop of Lusk. The Martyrology of Denegal associates MacCuillinn of Lusk with Odrhan of Lettrock as telling Claran his life would be cut short. The Acts of S. Maculin of Lusk, preserved in Trinity College Dublin, state "that he visited Scotland twice, and was in repute there". Alban Butler cites Colgan's manuscript in stating that St. Macculindus, bishop of Lusk, died in 497 and is commemorated on 6 September. However, he appears to have died in 496, not 497 as given by some sources.

== Remains ==
Samuel Lewis in his Topographical Dictionary of Ireland (1837) describes Lusk as "chiefly distinguished as the site of a monastery, over which St. Macculind, styled indifferently abbot or bishop, presided until his death in 497". Lusk takes its name from the Irish Lusca, meaning "vault". The huge vault is below the round tower of Lusk, and holds the body of St. Macculindus, buried around 496, and about 18 bishops who succeeded him. The tower itself has six stories, each reached from below by an iron ladder.

In Scotland the parish of Macalan or Macallan, was named after him. By 1872 the former parish of Macalen or Macalland had been annexed to Knockandu.

== Sources ==
- Butler, Alban (1866), The Lives of the Fathers, Martyrs, and Other Principal Saints, vol. 9, James Duffy
- Byrne, Joseph (1930), "Lusk and its Patron", The Schools’ Collection, vol. 0784, Milverton, Co. Dublin
- Forbes, Alexander Penrose (1872), Kalendars of Scottish Saints: With Personal Notices of Those of Alba, Laudonia, & Strathclyde : an Attempt to Fix the Districts of Their Several Missions and the Churches where They Were Chiefly Had in Remembrance, Edmonston and Douglas This article incorporates text from this source, which is in the public domain.
- Lewis, Samuel (1837), Topographical Dictionary of Ireland This article incorporates text from this source, which is in the public domain.
- O'Hanlon, John (1873), Lives of the Irish saints This article incorporates text from this source, which is in the public domain.
