= Emly =

Village in County Tipperary, Ireland

Emly Imleach Iubhair
- Village
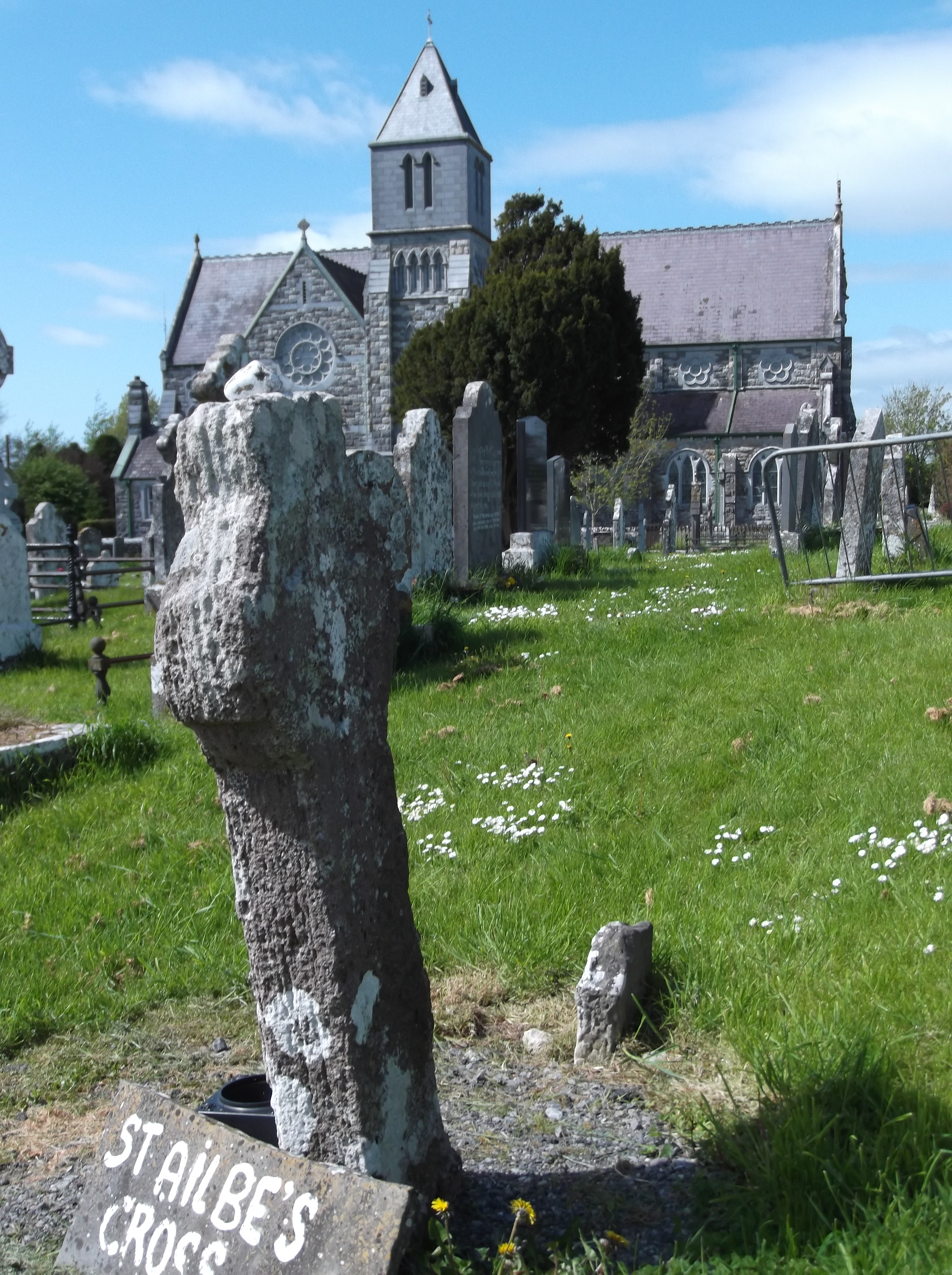
- Cross and Church of St Ailbe

- Location in Ireland
- Coordinates: 52°27′49″N 8°21′02″W
- Country: Ireland
- Province: Munster
- County: County Tipperary

Population (2016)
  - Total: 302
- Time zone: UTC+0 (WET)
  - Summer (DST): UTC-1 (IST (WEST))

Emly or Emlybeg (Irish: Imleach Iubhair, meaning 'Border of lake of yews') is a village in County Tipperary, Ireland. It is a civil parish in the historical barony of Clanwilliam. It is also a Catholic parish in the Archdiocese of Cashel and Emly.

The village is 14 km west of Tipperary town, on the R515 road which goes from Tipperary town to Abbeyfeale, County Limerick.

Emly had a population of 302 in 2016.

== History ==
=== Ancient times ===
The yew tree references the pre-Christian history of Emly. Emly is one of the oldest centres of Christianity in Ireland and pre-dates the coming to Ireland of the National Apostle, St. Patrick. Up until the early Middle Ages, Emly was the premier diocese in the south of Ireland. St. Ailbe is the patron saint of the Archdiocese of Cashel and Emly. Tradition tells us that he preached Christianity in Munster before the arrival of St. Patrick, and he is also associated with the founding of a monastery at Emly, which remained a Cathedral city until the 16th century. The Protestant cathedral functioned with a Chapter until the mid-19th century when it was dismantled and its materials sold for construction purposes.

The site of Emly was in ancient times known as Medón Mairtine, as it was the capital of an Érainn people called the Mairtine. After their apparent disappearance from the Irish landscape, the powerful Eóganachta were later found using the site for their chief church in early historical times.

=== St. Ailbe's church ===
The large Catholic St Ailbe's Church was built in the 1880s and replaced the older church (built early 19th century) which is now used as the village hall.

=== Monastery ===
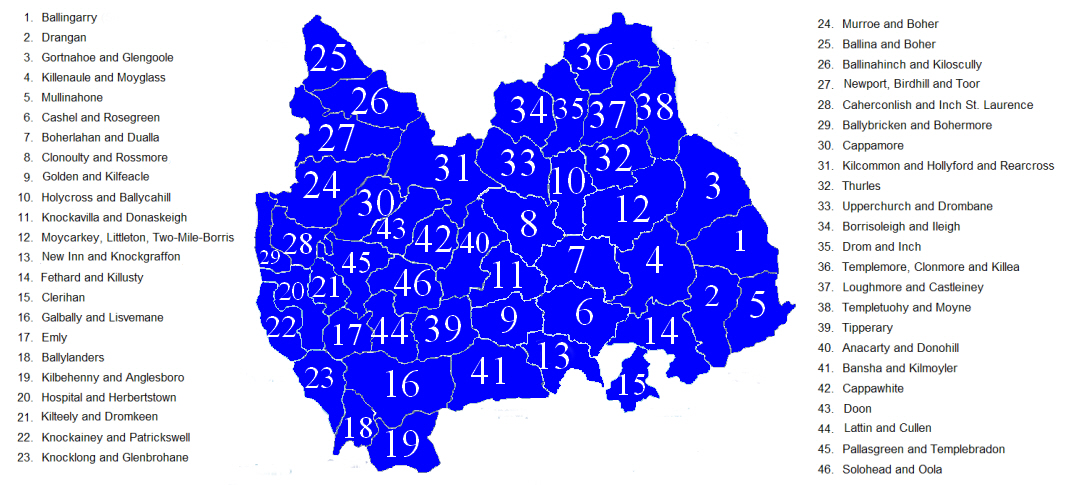
The parish, numbered 17, within the Archdiocese

Emly was the site of a monastery founded by Saint Ailbe, which became famous for its school.

Emly was established as an episcopal see in 1118 by the Synod of Ráth Breasail. In the Catholic Church, the diocese was merged in 1715 with the Archbishopric of Cashel, its former Metropolitan. The merged entity is today known as the Archdiocese of Cashel and Emly. In the Church of Ireland, the diocese, having formerly been united with Cashel, is now part of the United Dioceses of Limerick, Ardfert, Killaloe, Kilfenora, Clonfert, Kilmacduagh and Emly.

=== Annalistic references ===
See Annals of Inisfallen

- AI528.1 Kl. Reponse of Ailbe of Imlech Ibuir.
- AI661.1 Kl. Kl. Repose of Cumíne Fata, coarb of Brénainn, and of Conaing grandson of Dant, abbot of Imlech Ibuir.
- AI708.1 Kl. Conamail son of Carthach, abbot of Imlech Ibuir, rested.
- AI720.1 Kl. Cellach, abbot of Imlech Ibuir, rested.
- AI760.1 Kl. Tríchmech, abbot of Les Mór, rested, and Abnér, abbot of Imlech Ibuir.
- AI771.1 Brócán, son of Aduar, from Imlech [rested].
- AI781.1 Kl. Repose of Senchán, abbot of Imlech Ibuir.
- AI825.1 Kl. Repose of Flann son of Fairchellach, abbot of Les Mór, Imlech Ibuir, and Corcach.
- AI863.1 Kl. Repose of Dainél, abbot of Les Mór and Corcach.
- AI890.1 Kl. The slaying of Eógan son of Cenn Faelad, abbot of Imlech Ibuir.
- AI899 Kl. Repose of Mescell son of Cumascach, abbot of Imlech Ibuir, and Flann, son of Conall, took the abbacy after him.
- AI904.1 Kl. Repose of Flann son of Conail, abbot of Imlech Ibuir.
- AI913.1 Bissextile. Kl. Repose of Tipraite son of Mael Finn, abbot of Imlech Ibuir.
- AI914.2 Eochu, son of Scandán, took the abbacy of Imlech Ibuir.
- AI935.1 Kl. Repose of Mac Lenna, abbot of Imlech Ibuir.
- AI942.1 Kl. Repose of Eochaid son of Scandlán, abbot of Imlech Ibuir.
- AI942.2 Mael Cáich, lector of Imlech Ibuir, rested in Christ.
- AI954.2 Repose of Dub Inse, learned bishop of Ireland, and of Cellachán, king of Caisel, and of Éladach the learned, abbot of Ros Ailithir, and of Uarach, bishop of Imlech Ibuir, and of Célechair, abbot of Cluain Moccu Nóis and Cluain Iraird, and of Cormac Ua Maíl Shluaig, learned sage of Mumu, and of Lugaid Ua Maíl Shempail, abbot of Domnach Pátraic, and of Cenn Faelad son of Suibne, anchorite of Cluain Ferta Brénainn.
- AI968.2 The plundering of Imlech Ibuir, and a camp [was pitched] there for two days.
- AI980.5 Repose of Faelán son of Caellaide, abbot of Imlech Ibuir.
- AI980.3 Tipraite was removed from his abbot's seat in Imlech Ibuir. The abbacy was then given to Cétfaid, fosterson of Riata.
- AI987.2 A hosting by Brian, son of Cennétig, across Desmumu, and he took the hostages of Les Mór, Corcach and Imlech Ibuir as a guarantee of the banishment of robbers and lawless people therefrom.
- AI990.2 Marcán, son of Cennétig, took the abbacy of Imlech Ibuir; and the son of Ímar abandoned Port Láirge; and Ros Ailithir was invaded by foreigners, and the lector, namely, Mac Coise Dobráin, was taken prisoner by them, and he was ransomed by Brian at Inis Cathaig.
- AI995.5 Colum Ua Laigenain took the abbacy of Imlech Ibuir.
- AI1015.5 Fiach, son of Dubchrón, was treacherously killed by Carrán's son in the middle of Imlech Ibuir.
- AI1015.10 The vacating of Imlech Ibuir, and the invasion of Lothra.
- AI1024.4 Mael Mórda Ua hArrochtáin, lector of Imlech Ibuir, and the most notable in Mumu for almsgiving and largesse, rested in Christ.

== Amenities and facilities ==
There is a shop on the main street of the village, with a smaller store (which also sells fuel) on the outskirts of the village on the Tipperary road. There are five licensed premises in the village, three of which have regular opening hours.

Emly GAA club is centrally located, with a large floodlit GAA pitch with a covered stand running its full length. It is near the National School.

== Transport ==
Emly railway station opened on 1 January 1880 and closed on 9 September 1963.

== Community awards ==
In September 2009 the village won the Irish Tidy Towns Competition. In 2013, Emly came first in Ireland in the Energy Neighbourhoods competition. The community achieved a 37% reduction in home energy consumption.

== People ==
- Dermot O'Hurley, Archbishop of Cashel, was born at Emly about the year 1530. He spent much of his time working in Rome in the service of the Church. He was still a layman when in 1581, he was appointed Archbishop of Cashel.
- Terence Albert O'Brien, bishop of Emly from 1647 to 1651. He was captured by Cromwellian troops after the siege of Limerick and with other leaders was put to death.
- Paddy Russell, GAA referee.
- Michael Frawley, GAA County Board Chairman, Munster Council Chairman and a Trustee of the GAA.
- James "Jim" Mitchel (1864-1921), born in Emly, represented the United States at the 1904 Summer Olympics.

== See also ==
- List of towns and villages in Ireland
- Catholic Encyclopaedia
- Baron Emly
- Dean of Emly
