= Patrick Collier =

Irish Roman Catholic priest

The Most Reverend Patrick Collier
- Bishop of Ossory
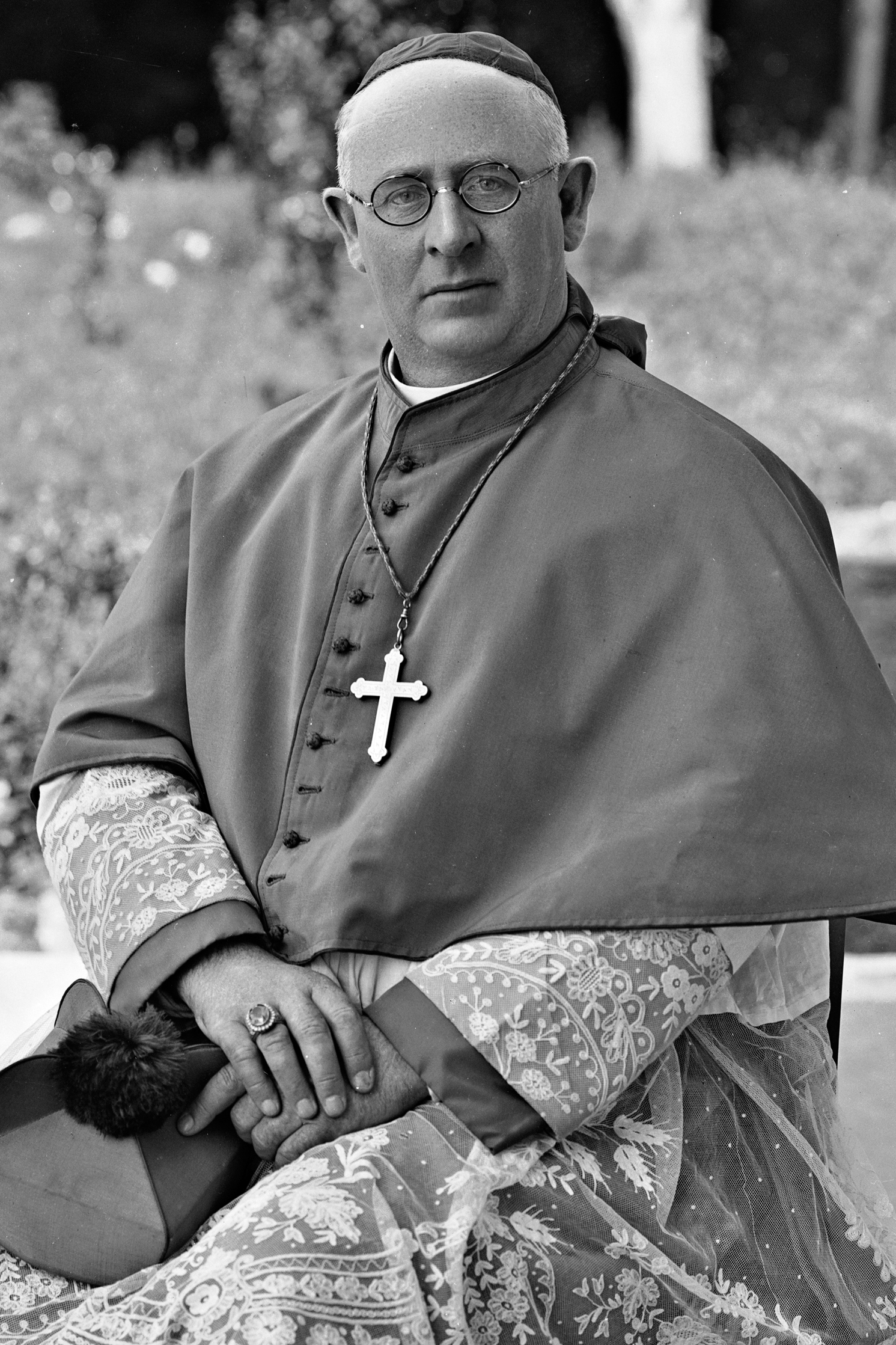
- Collier, c. 1930
- Church: Catholic Church
- Appointed: 1 October 1928
- Predecessor: Abraham Brownrigg, S.S.S.
- Previous posts: Coadjutor Bishop of Ossory (1928–1928); Titular Bishop of Hemeria (Himeria) (1928–1928)

Orders
- Ordination: 24 June 1907 by Bishop Abraham Brownrigg, S.S.S.
- Consecration: 5 August 1928 by Archbishop Edward Joseph Byrne

Personal details
- Born: Patrick Collier; 13 January 1880 Camross, Mountrath, County Laois, Ireland
- Died: 10 January 1964 (aged 83)
- Buried: St Mary's Cathedral, Kilkenny
- Education: St. Kieran's College; Maynooth College

Styles of Patrick Collier
- Reference style: His Excellency; The Most Reverend
- Spoken style: Your Excellency
- Religious style: Bishop

Patrick Collier (13 January 1880 – 10 January 1964) was an Irish Roman Catholic priest, later appointed as Bishop of Ossory.

== Early life and education ==
Patrick Collier was born at Camross, Mountrath, County Laois on 13 January 1880. Dr Collier first attended St. Kieran's College. Kilkenny, and then proceeded to St Patrick's College Maynooth where he was ordained on 24 June 1907 to serve as a priest in the Diocese of Ossory. In the following August he went to the Diocese of Shrewsbury and worked in the parish of St Alban's Wallasey, Cheshire.

== Priestly ministry ==
He was recalled to his native diocese in 1911 and appointed to the staff of St Kieran's where he served for a decade. In 1921 Collier was sent to serve at St. Tighearhach's Church, Cullahill, County Laois. He was here for two years until he was appointed back to the staff of St Kieran's College.

== Episcopal ministry ==
It was announced on 18 May 1923 that Collier was to be made coadjutor Bishop of Ossory and he received episcopal ordination several months later on 5 August 1928 in St Mary's Cathedral, Kilkenny. The ageing Bishop Abraham Brownrigg died several months later at the age of 92 and Collier automatically succeeded him.

Dr Collier was remembered in one tribute to him as being "responsible for many works which remained in a lasting testimony to his zeal and energy. These included improvements to St Mary’s Cathedral and a large extension to St Kieran’s College, the building of new churches and new schools throughout the Diocese and improvements to many churches."

The same tribute recalled "Collier knew his people and their wants and he took a very special interest in the poor. He gave unstinting support to well-known organisations such as the St Vincent de paul Society and any organisation that aimed at improving conditions for the poor, always found him a ready and generous benefactor."

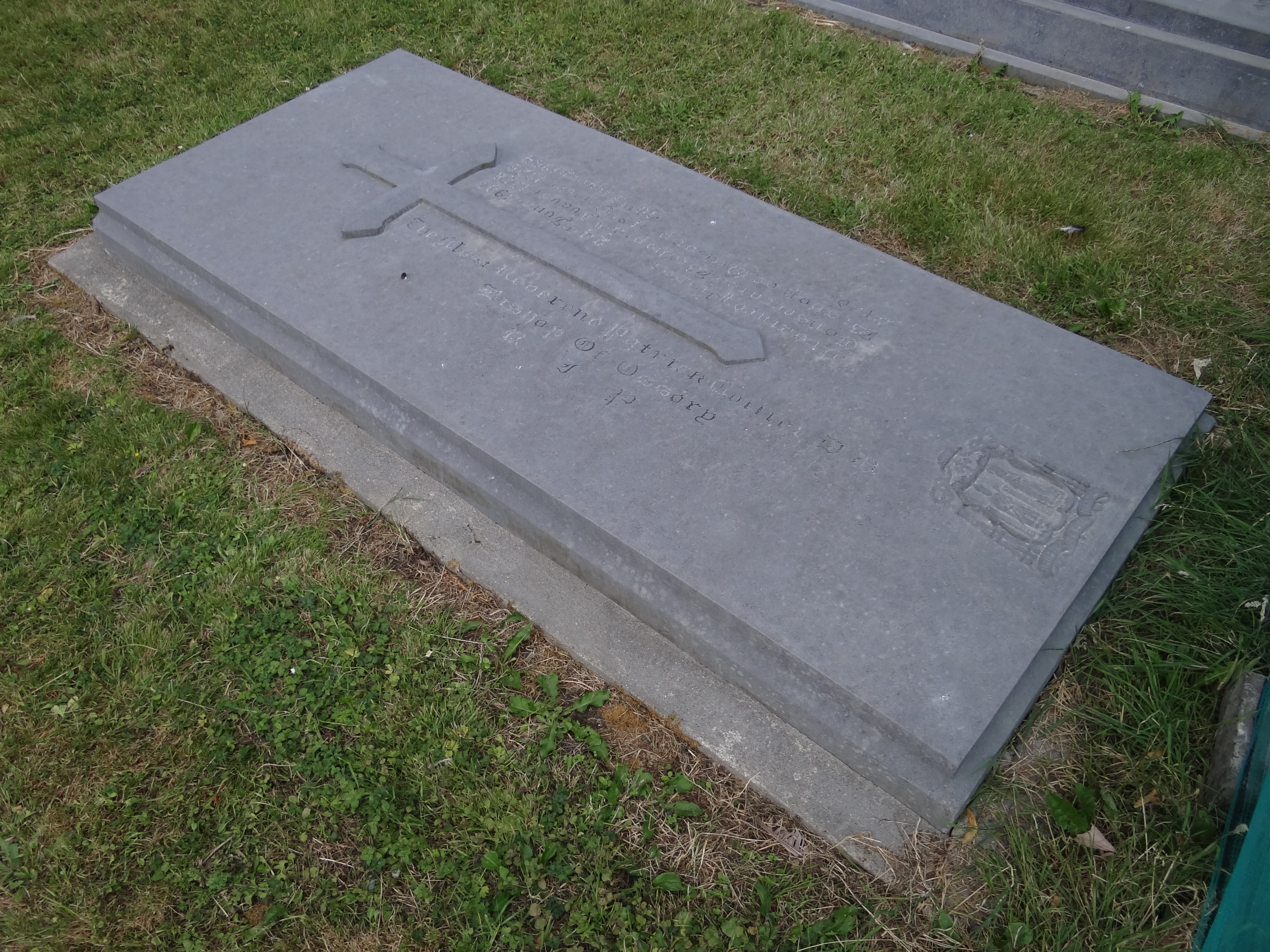
Collier's grave on the grounds of St. Mary's Cathedral, Kilkenny

He served until his own death on 10 January 1964, three days before his 84th birthday. He is buried in the grounds of St. Mary's Cathedral, Kilkenny.

A wing in the Ossory diocesan seminary, St. Kieran's College was named after Dr Collier; it opened in 1956.

Catholic Church titles
Preceded by Abraham Brownrigg	Bishop of Ossory; 1928–1964	Succeeded by Peter Birch
