= Laurence Forristal =

Irish Roman Catholic prelate

Styles of Laurence Forristal
- Reference style: The Most Reverend
- Spoken style: My Lord
- Religious style: Bishop

Laurence Forristal (5 June 1931 – 10 October 2018) was an Irish Roman Catholic prelate, who served as the Bishop of Ossory from 1981 to 2007.

== Early life and education ==
Born to William Forristal and Kathleen Forristal (née Phelan) in Thomastown, County Kilkenny, Ireland in 1931, Forristal was educated locally at Mercy Convent primary school and the Boys' National School in Thomastown, and at Mount St Joseph College, Roscrea. He studied for the priesthood at Clonliffe College, Dublin, and studied philosophy at University College, Dublin. He pursued further studies at the Propaganda Fide College in Rome and was ordained there as a priest for the Archdiocese of Dublin on 21 December 1955.

== Priestly ministry ==
After ordination he was appointed by Archbishop John Charles McQuaid to work in the chancellery in Drumcondra, an appointment which was extended by McQuaid's successor, Archbishop Dermot Ryan, until 1980. He combined this administrative work with parish ministry in Raheny and Finglas, becoming parish priest there in 1977. In the same year, he was appointed Vicar General which gave him a ringside seat for the visit of Pope John Paul II in 1979.

== Episcopal ministry ==
He was appointed an auxiliary bishop of Dublin and Titular Bishop of Rotdon on 3 December 1979 and received episcopal ordination on 20 January 1980.

As auxiliary bishop in Dublin his role and knowledge of clerical child sex abuse was considered by Judge Yvonne Murphy. Forristal's obituary noted that Murphy wrote of the then auxiliary bishop "Of Dublin’s eight auxiliaries, the report said “Bishop Forristal was the only bishop to unequivocally admit in evidence to the commission that he may not have handled matters satisfactorily".

The following year, he was appointed the diocesan bishop of the Diocese of Ossory on 30 June 1981.

In 1994, he decided to close Ireland's oldest seminary, St Kieran's College as a result of falling numbers.

Bishop Forristal retired on 14 September 2007, and assumed the title Bishop Emeritus of Ossory.

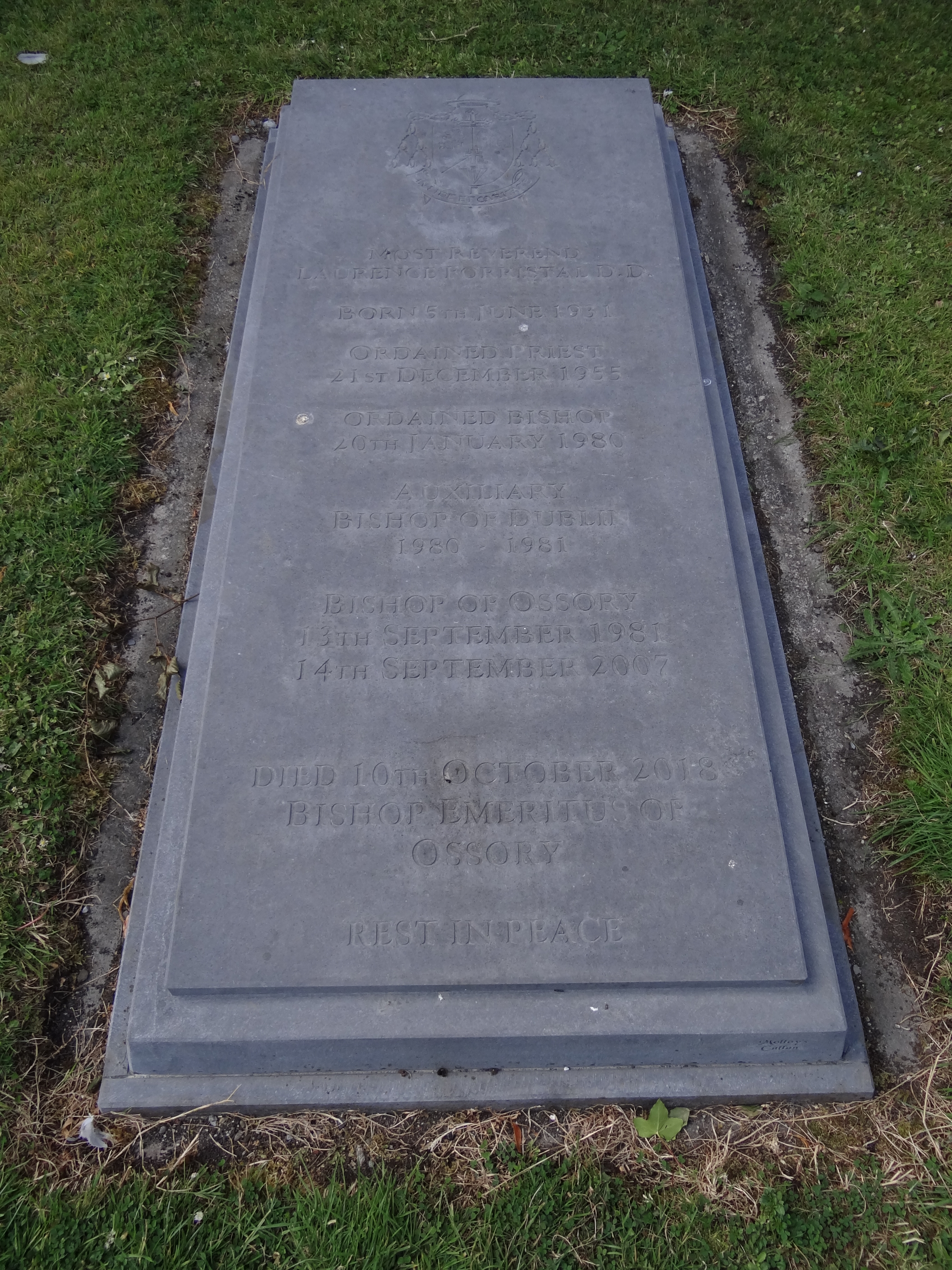
Forristal's grave on the grounds of St. Mary's Cathedral, Kilkenny

His death was announced by one of his successors as Bishop of Ossory Dermot Farrell on 10 October 2018. He is buried in the grounds of St. Mary's Cathedral, Kilkenny.

Catholic Church titles
Preceded by Peter Birch	Bishop of Ossory; 1981–2007	Succeeded by Séamus Freeman
