= Christopher Gaffney =

Christopher or Chris Gaffney may refer to:

- Christopher Gaffney (bishop) (died 1576), Irish bishop
- Chris Gaffney (musician) (1950–2008), American singer–songwriter
- Christopher Gaffney (archaeologist) (born 1962), British archaeologist
