= Felix Ua Duib Sláin =

Irish bishop

Blessed Felix Ua Duib Sláin O.Cist.
- Bishop of Ossory
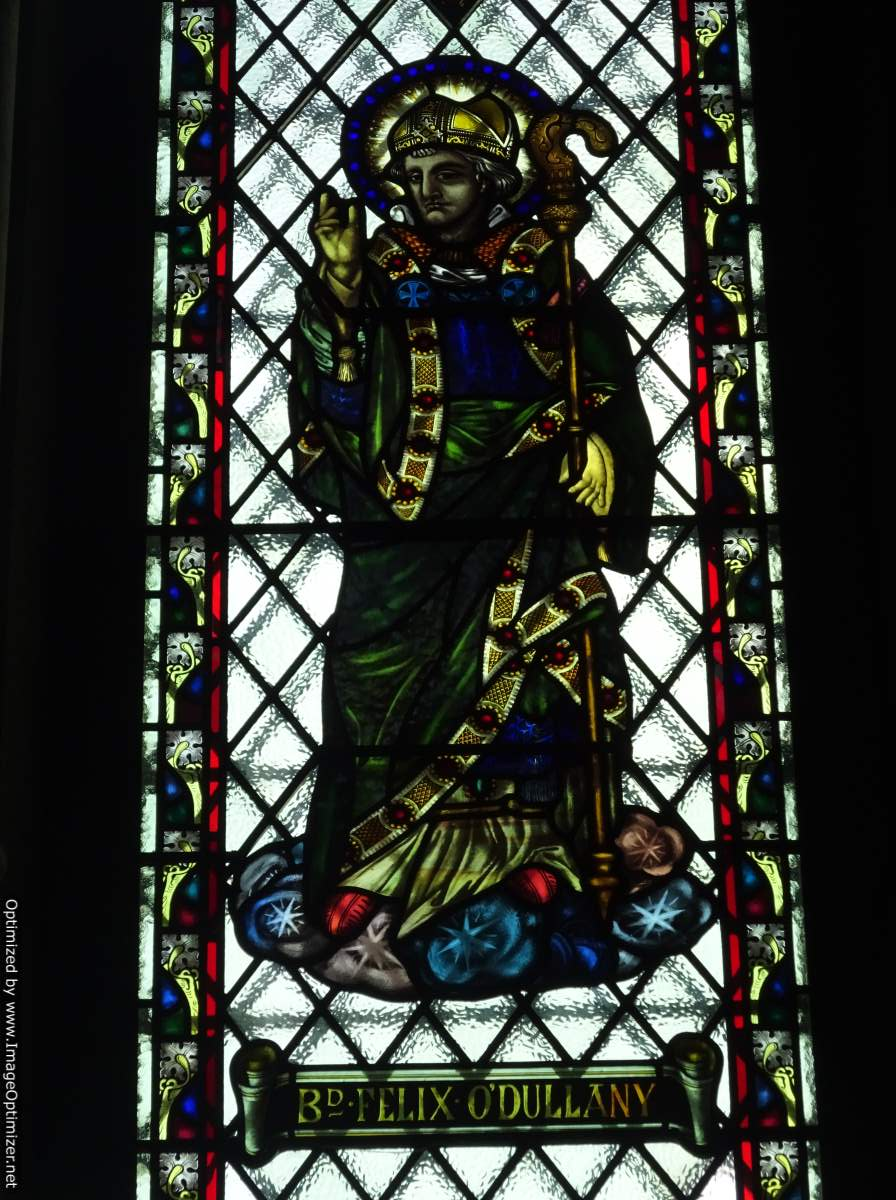
- Stained glass window depicting Felix O'Dullany, St Mary's Cathedral, Kilkenny
- See: Ossory
- In office: 1178/80–1202
- Predecessor: Domnall Ua Fogartaig
- Successor: Hugo de Rous

Personal details
- Born: mid-12th century
- Died: 24 January 1202
- Buried: Jerpoint Abbey
- Denomination: Catholic (pre-Reformation)
- Residence: Aghaboe and Kilkenny

Sainthood
- Feast day: 24 January
- Shrines: Jerpoint Abbey

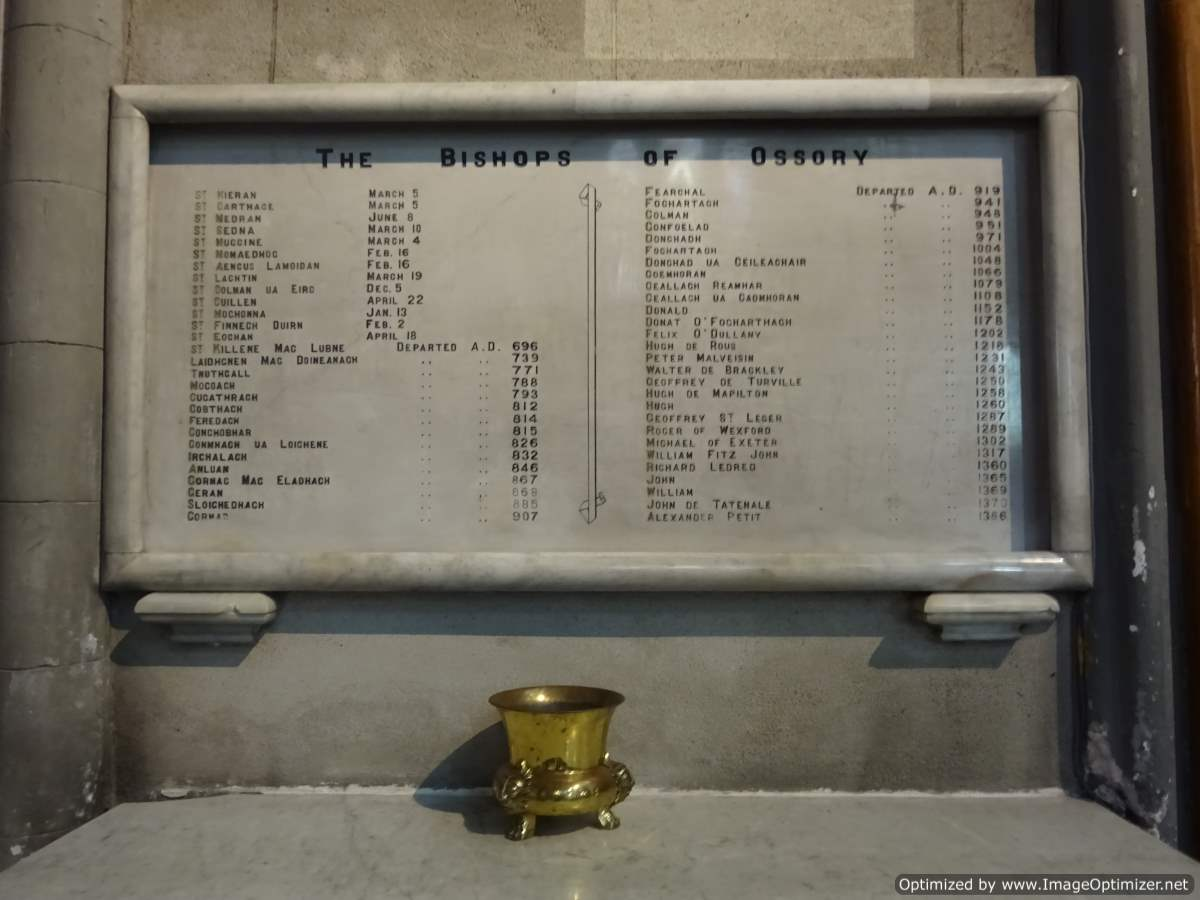
Plaque in St Mary's Cathedral, Kilkenny with a list of Bishops of Ossory; Felix is listed as "Felix O'Dullany."

Felix Ua Duib Sláin (Middle Irish: [ˈfeːliks ua duvʲ ˈslaːnʲ]; c. 1140s – 24 January 1202), often anglicised as Felix O'Dullany (O'Dulaney, O'Dullaney, O'Dulany etc.) was a medieval Irish bishop.

== Biography ==
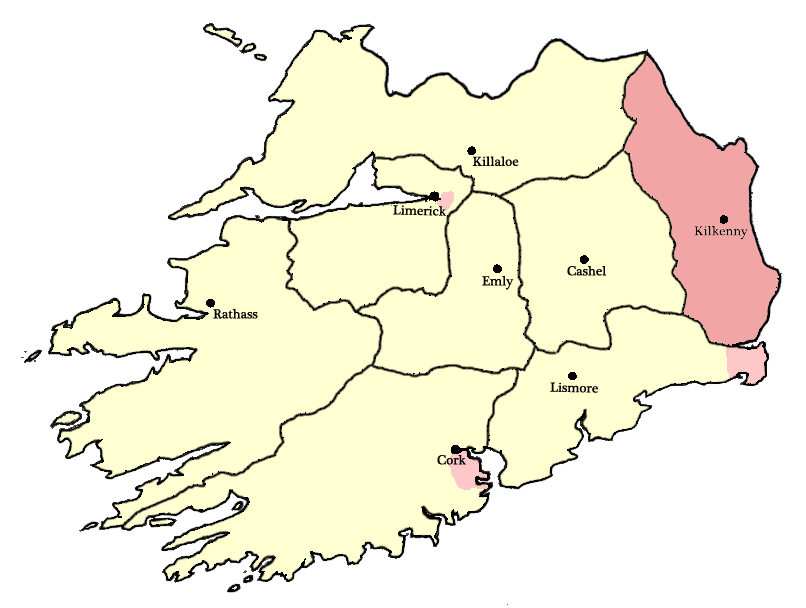
Map of Ossory (pink) in the 12th century.

Felix had a Latin first name meaning "fortunate"; his surname literally means "grandson/descendant of Dubh Shláine," an Irish name meaning "black [haired?] one of the Slaney", a family formerly powerful in the Upper Woods area of modern County Laois. Felix is recorded as a member of the Order of Cistercians, taking on the white habit at either Baltinglass Abbey or Mellifont Abbey. He is credited with founding Jerpoint Abbey. However, this is not certain; John R. Sommerfeldt, a Cistercian historian, claimed that Felix may actually have been a Benedictine.

Felix became Bishop of Ossory, located in southeast Ireland, between 1178 and 1180.

He is known for his association with St John's Priory, Kilkenny; around 1200 he granted the tithes of Kilkenny Castle to Brother Osbert, the Prior of Saint John's Hospital, allowing them to develop the Augustinian abbey. He moved the see from Aghaboe Abbey to St Canice's Cathedral, Kilkenny, due to war in the Leinster region.

Felix was unafraid of the powerful Norman lords, excommunicating Theobald Walter, 1st Chief Butler of Ireland when he usurped Church land.

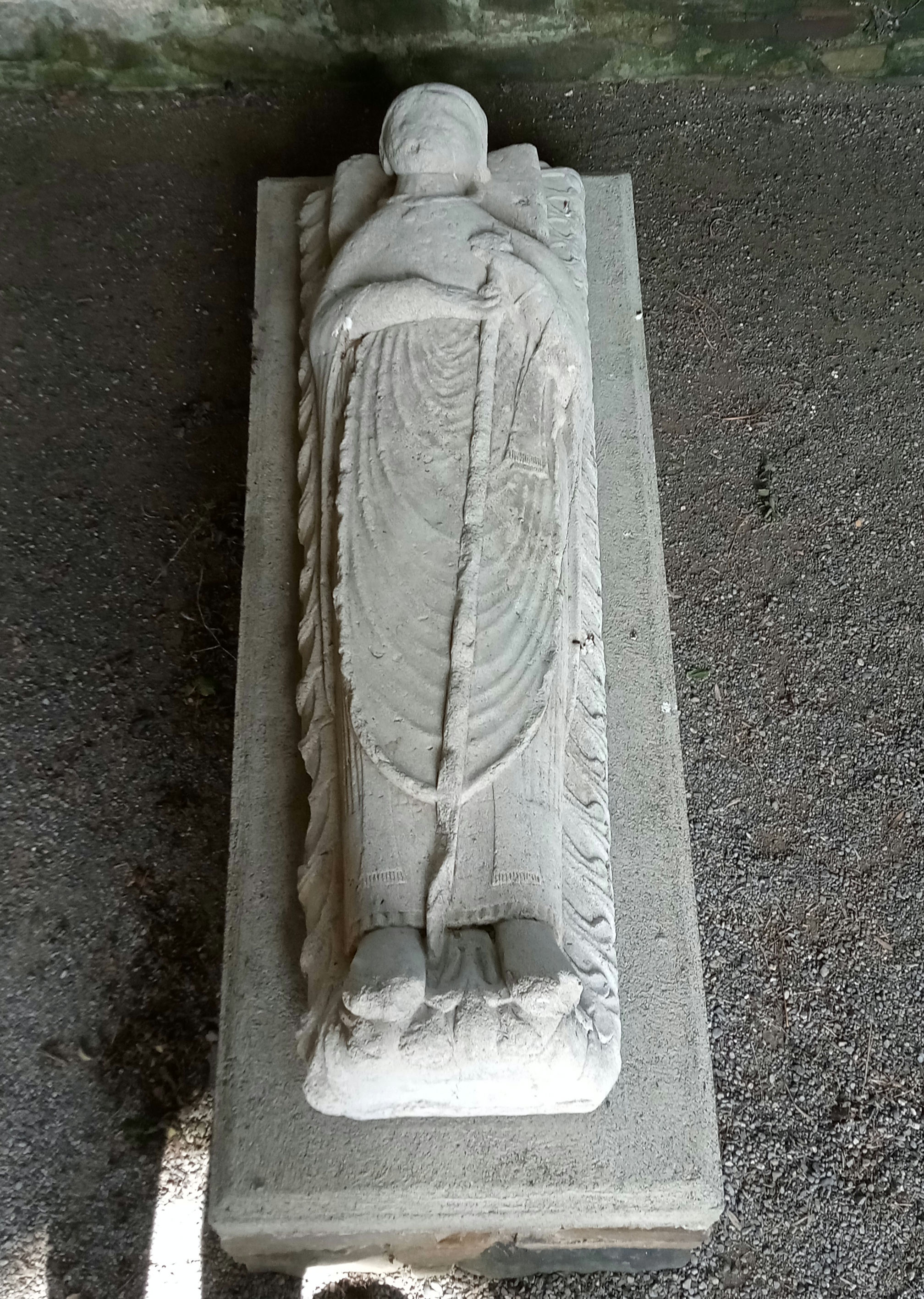
Effigy tomb of Bishop Felix O'Dullany at Jerpoint Abbey

Felix died on 24 January 1202. He was buried at Jerpoint Abbey on the north side of the altar. His effigy depicts a snake biting his crozier. Many miracles were claimed to have been worked at his tomb.

David Roth in his history of Kilkenny credited O'Dullany with the foundation of Irishtown in the city, but this seems to have been an attempt to deny the city an Irish foundation rather than a real history.

He is commonly referred to as "Blessed Felix O'Dullany", a title in Catholicism applied to a person who is believed to have entered into Heaven and have the capacity to intercede on behalf of individuals who pray in his or her name. Prior to 1634 the title "Blessed" could be awarded by local bishops.
