= Kilkenny Cathedral =

Kilkenny Cathedral may refer to:

- St Canice's Cathedral, Kilkenny, one of the Church of Ireland cathedrals of the Diocese of Cashel and Ossory.
- St. Mary's Cathedral, Kilkenny, the Roman Catholic cathedral for the Diocese of Ossory.
