= Abraham Brownrigg =

Irish Roman Catholic prelate

Abraham Brownrigg SSS
- Bishop of Ossory
- Church: Catholic Church
- Diocese: Diocese of Ossory
- In office: 28 October 1884 – 1 October 1928
- Predecessor: Francis Moran
- Successor: Patrick Collier

Orders
- Ordination: 21 April 1861
- Consecration: 14 December 1884 by Daniel McGettigan

Personal details
- Born: 3 December 1836 Ballypierce (near Kildavin), County Carlow, United Kingdom of Great Britain and Ireland
- Died: 1 October 1928 (aged 91) Kilkenny, County Kilkenny, Irish Free State

Styles of Abraham Brownrigg
- Reference style: The Most Reverend
- Spoken style: My Lord
- Religious style: Bishop

Abraham Brownrigg (3 December 1836 in Ballypierce – 1 October 1928 in Kilkenny) was an Irish Roman Catholic prelate, who served as the Bishop of Ossory from 1884 until his death.

Brownrigg was educated by the Christian Brothers at O'Connell School in North Richmond Street, Dublin, after his father moved his family to Dublin following the death of his father he was adopted by relatives and studied at St Peter's College, Wexford and St Patrick's College, Maynooth. He was ordained priest on 21 April 1861. He was principal of St Aidan's Academy, Enniscorthy, County Wexford, and then at St Peter's in the same county. He was consecrated a bishop on 14 December 1884.

Catholic Church titles
Preceded by Francis Moran	Bishop of Ossory; 1884–1928	Succeeded by Patrick Collier
