= John Tonory =

John Tonory,O.S.A. was Bishop of Ossory from 1566 until his death on 3 August 1576.

Tonory was nominated in December 1553 by Queen Mary I and consecrated on January 1554, but after the accession of Queen Elizabeth I he was replaced.

== Notes ==
Church of Ireland titles
| Preceded by John Bale | Bishop of Ossory; 1553–1555 | Succeeded by Christopher Gaffney |
