= William FitzJohn =

Irish bishop and Lord Chancellor

William Fitzjohn (died 15 September 1326) was a leading prelate in early fourteenth-century Ireland. He held the offices of Bishop of Ossory, Archbishop of Cashel, and Lord Chancellor of Ireland. He is chiefly remembered now for building the town walls of Cashel. His last years were troubled, as he quarrelled with both the English Crown and the Pope. He complained constantly about his poverty. He faced accusations, many of them clearly false, of corruption and immoral living.

== Early career ==
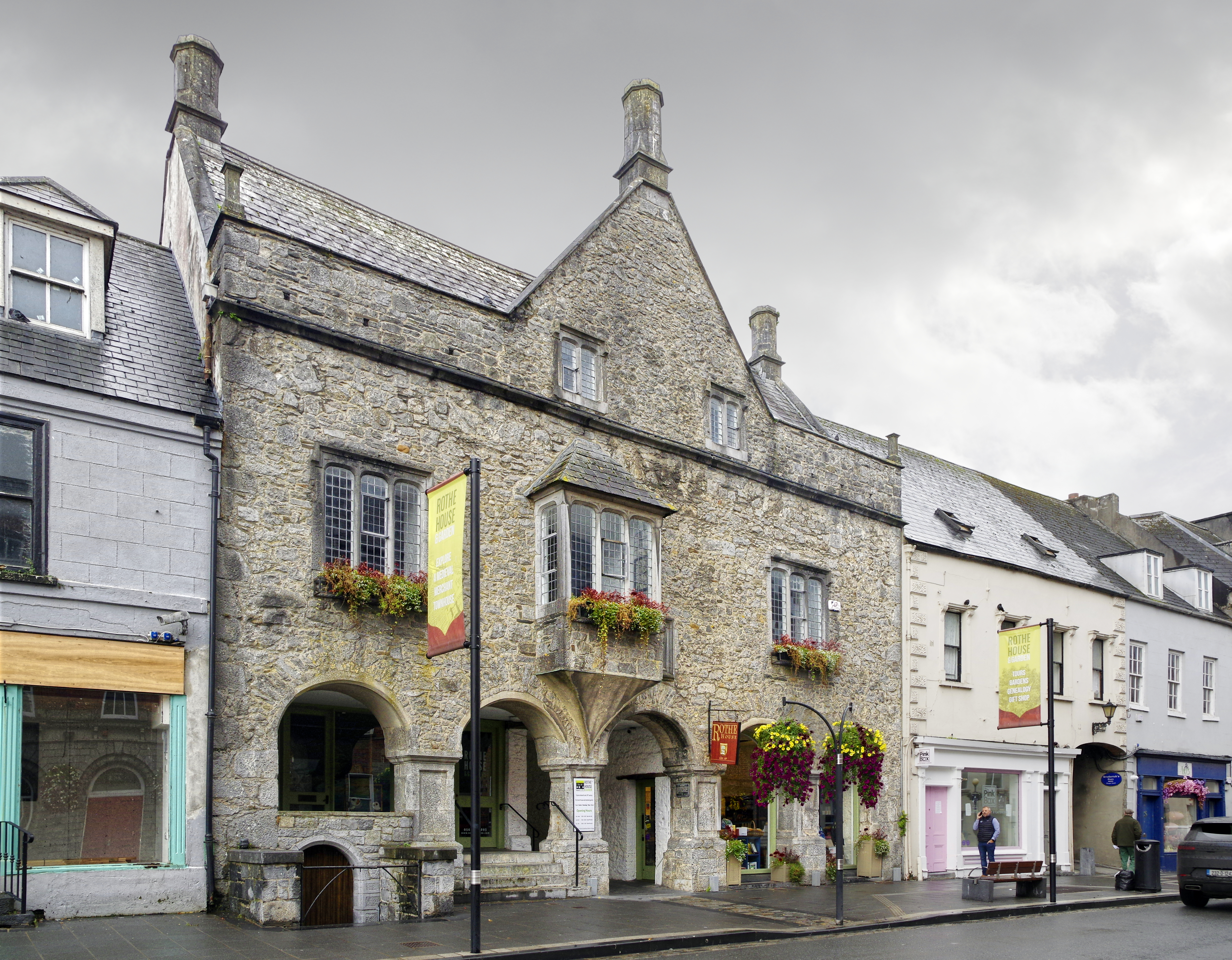
Rothe House, Kilkenny: it has been claimed that the Archbishop was related to the Rothes

He is variously said to have been born in England or in Kilkenny, but little is known of his life before 1300. He first appeared in Ireland as a Canon of St. Canice's Cathedral, Kilkenny. Some sources name him William Fitzjohn Rothe: it has been suggested that he was related to the prominent Rothe family of Rothe House, Kilkenny. In 1302 the see of Ossory became vacant and Fitzjohn, who was much loved by the clergy of the diocese, was their unanimous choice as Bishop of Ossory. In 1310 he was present at the session of the Parliament of Ireland held in Kilkenny, where he and his fellow bishops decreed that monks of Gaelic origin should not be professed.

== Archbishop of Cashel ==
In 1317 the Archbishopric of Cashel became vacant, causing a fierce contest between three rival candidates. Pope John XXII refused to appoint any of them and chose Fitzjohn instead. King Edward II, though he originally had a candidate of his own, appears to have supported the choice of Fitzjohn, whom he knew and respected, and even to have lobbied for him in the final stages of the contest. The King had already nominated FitzJohn as one of three bishops asked to draw up a plan for the reorganisation of the episcopal structure of the Church in Ireland. The Archbishop served as Lord Chancellor of Ireland between 1318 and 1320, and briefly as Lord Deputy of Ireland in 1318.

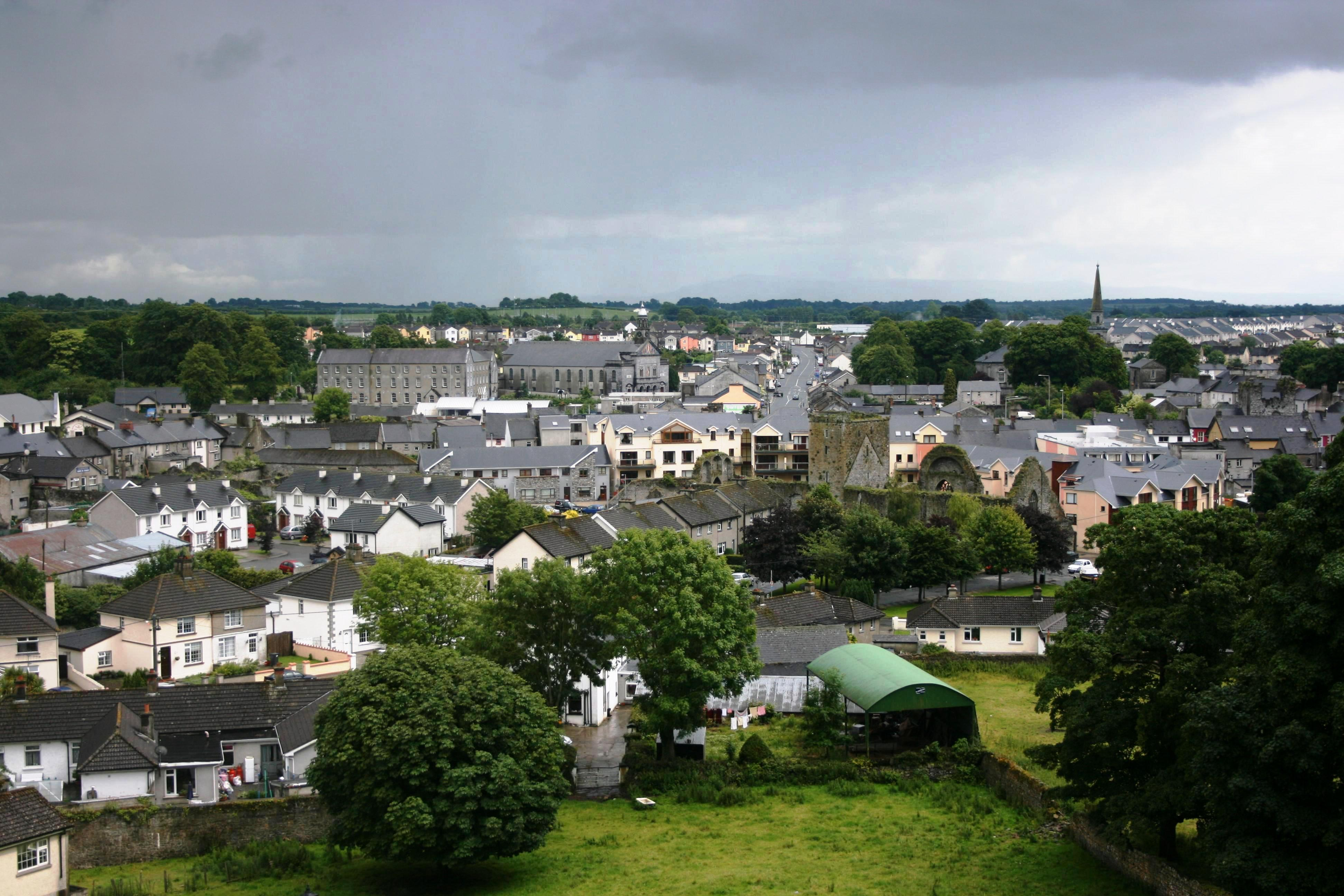
View of present-day Cashel as seen from the Rock of Cashel

== Later life ==
As Archbishop he is mainly remembered today for overseeing the building of the walls of Cashel town. The archdiocese suffered greatly during the Bruce campaign in Ireland in 1315-1318 and Fitzjohn found himself in severe financial difficulty as a result. In 1320 the King wrote to the Pope asking for the Archbishop to be released from paying certain debts, on account of the invasion: "he has not received the least profits out of his See, but was obliged to run into debt with his neighbours and friends even for necessaries". To assist Fitzjohn financially, the King appointed him Keeper of the Rolls, with an income of £500 a year.

Soon afterwards relations between the King and the Archbishop soured, and the King complained that Fitzjohn had defrauded him of the benefices of the parish of Dungarvan and diverted them for his own use. His relations with the Pope were also poor by this time: complaints were made to the Vatican that he had illegally imprisoned the Dean of Cloyne and the Cathedral Chapter, and had distributed the benefices of the Diocese of Cloyne to his own friends. Due perhaps to the poverty of which he frequently complained, he refused to pay his Papal dues and was excommunicated as a result.

== Character ==
Fitzjohn died on 15 September 1326, still under sentence of excommunication. O'Flanagan describes him as a man of great influence and power who was revered by the clergy and laity of his diocese. However, he can hardly have been universally beloved, judging by the number of complaints made over the years about his greed, corruption and immoral living; and his quarrels with the Papacy and the King (previously a staunch friend of his) show the less agreeable side of his character. He was reputed to have accumulated great wealth, but this seems unlikely in view of the pleas of poverty made by King Edward to the Pope on his behalf, just six years before he died, although his alleged appropriation of the benefices of Cloyne gives some credence to the story. Lurid rumours about his private life - in particular the story that he had fathered fourteen illegitimate daughters, all of whom he married to very rich men - which were circulated in his last years, can probably be discounted as malicious inventions.
