= Séamus Freeman =

Roman Catholic prelate (1944–2022)

The Most Reverend Seamus Freeman S.A.C.
- Bishop Emeritus of Ossory
- Archdiocese: Dublin
- Diocese: Ossory
- Appointed: 14 September 2007
- Term ended: 29 July 2016
- Predecessor: Laurence Forristal
- Successor: Dermot Pius Farrell
- Previous post: Rector General of Society of the Catholic Apostolate (1992–2004)

Orders
- Ordination: 12 June 1971
- Consecration: 2 December 2007 by Diarmuid Martin

Personal details
- Born: 23 February 1944 Mullinahone, County Tipperary, Ireland
- Died: 20 August 2022 (aged 78) Dublin, Ireland
- Buried: St Mary's Cathedral, Kilkenny

Styles of Séamus Freeman
- Reference style: The Most Reverend
- Spoken style: Your Grace
- Religious style: Monsignor
- Posthumous style: not applicable

Séamus Freeman S.A.C. (23 February 1944 – 20 August 2022) was the Roman Catholic Bishop of the Diocese of Ossory who was appointed by Pope Benedict XVI on 14 September 2007. He later resigned as bishop on 29 July 2016.

== Biography ==
Freeman was the eldest of eight children. His family moved to Callan, County Kilkenny, where he attended school. After his education he entered the Pallottines in Thurles, County Tipperary, and studied theology at St. Patrick's College, Thurles, and philosophy at University College Dublin. He was ordained to the priesthood on 12 June 1971. He continued his education in the Catholic University of America where he studied psychology.

He then went to Rome where he worked for his Religious Society. In 1981 he was appointed rector and director of formation of the Pallottines in Thurles. He remained in Thurles until 1989 when he was appointed the vicar general of the society, becoming its rector general in 1992, in this capacity he served two six-year terms. In October 2004 he was appointed parish priest in Rome. In December 2005 he was elected president of the General Coordination Council of the Union of Catholic Apostolate.

=== Episcopal ministry ===
On hearing the news of the appointment of Freeman, Archbishop Diarmuid Martin remarked: "He is an exceptionally warm and kind man who I'm sure will quickly win the affection of the diocese. His genuine humility hides a deep spirituality and the breath of his pastoral experience".

He was ordained to the episcopate and installed on 2 December 2007. The Principal Consecrator was the Metropolitan Archbishop Diarmuid Martin, while the principal Co-Consecrators were Archbishop Giuseppe Lazzarotto, Apostolic Nuncio and Bishop Laurence Forristal the Bishop Emeritus of Ossory.

In December 2010, Bishop Freeman wrote in the Irish Times of the Pastoral Letter of Pope Benedict XVI to the Catholics of Ireland, "There was widespread disappointment among the faithful that in the pope’s letter last March, sex abuse was not seen as a symptom of shortcomings in church structure." He noted that people "observed there was no critique of the role of the Vatican, and little or no acknowledgment of the exclusion of lay people from roles in which they can contribute".

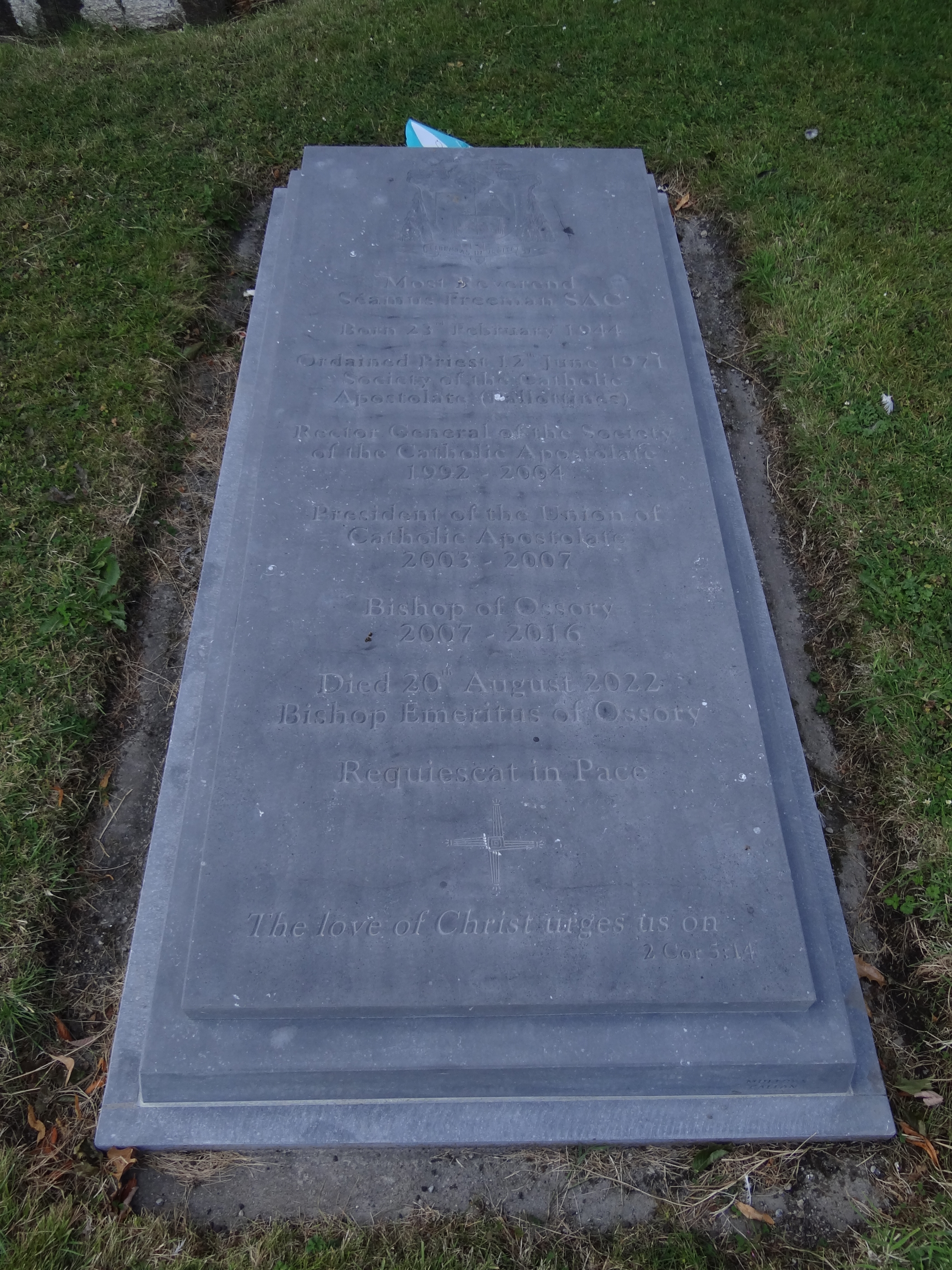
Freeman's grave on the grounds of St. Mary's Cathedral, Kilkenny

On 29 July 2016, Pope Francis accepted Freeman's letter of resignation. Freeman stated that he resigned due to poor health. Bishop Freeman died on 20 August 2022, aged 78. He is buried in the grounds of St. Mary's Cathedral, Kilkenny.

Religious titles
Preceded by Laurence Forristal	Bishop of Ossory; 2007–2016	Succeeded by Dermot Farrell
