= Roman Catholic Diocese of Ossory =

Catholic diocese in Ireland

Diocese of Ossory Dioecesis Ossoriensis Deoise Osraí

Catholic
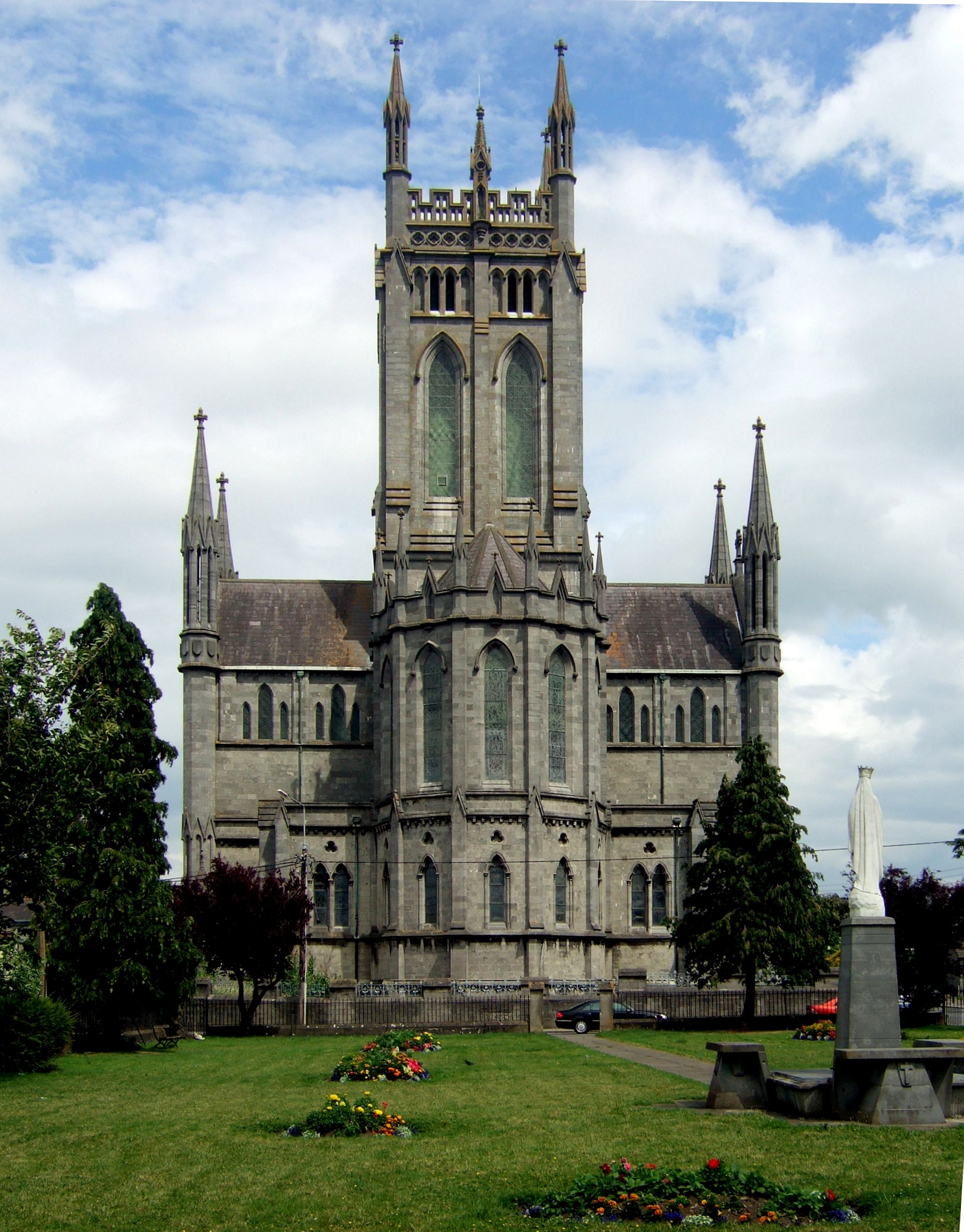
- St. Mary's Cathedral, Kilkenny, the episcopal seat of the bishops of Ossory

Location
- Country: Ireland
- Territory: Most of County Kilkenny and parts of counties Laois and Offaly
- Ecclesiastical province: Province of Dublin
- Metropolitan: Archdiocese of Dublin

Statistics
- Area: 761 sq mi (1,970 km^{2})
- Population: 84,244

Information
- Denomination: Catholic Church
- Sui iuris church: Latin Church
- Rite: Roman Rite
- Established: Diocese in 1111
- Cathedral: St Mary's Cathedral, Kilkenny
- Patron saint: St Kieran

Current leadership
- Pope: Leo XIV
- Bishop: Gerard Nash; Bishop of Ossory
- Metropolitan Archbishop: Dermot Farrell; Archbishop of Dublin

Map
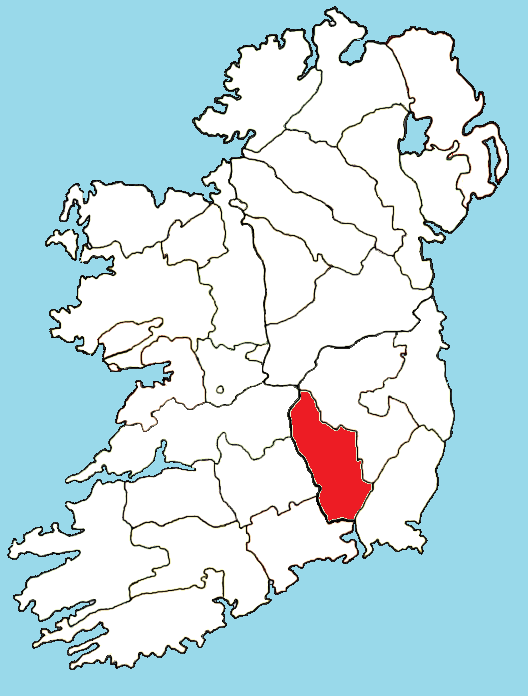

Website
- ossory.ie

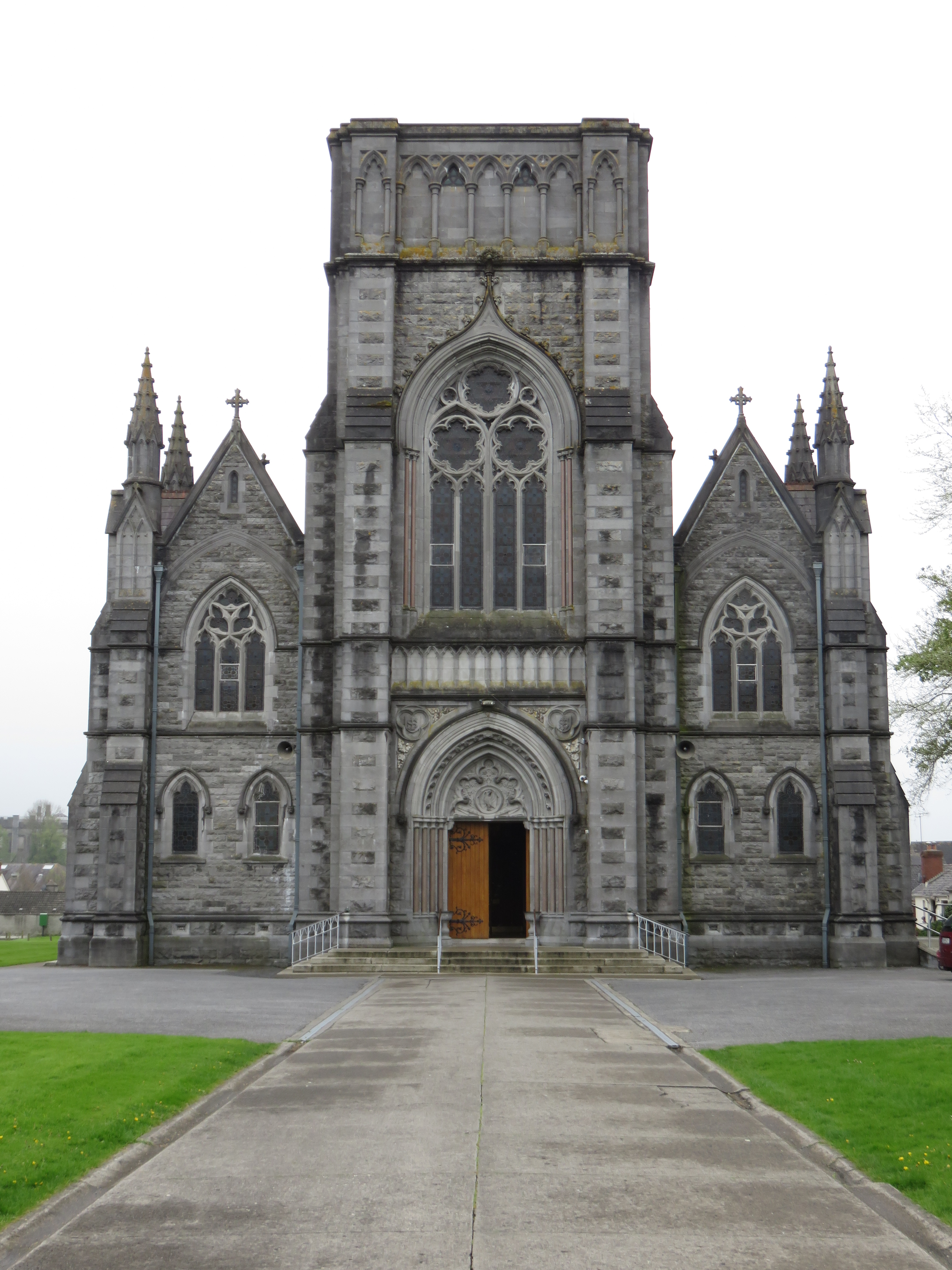
Church of Saint John the Evangelist in 2018

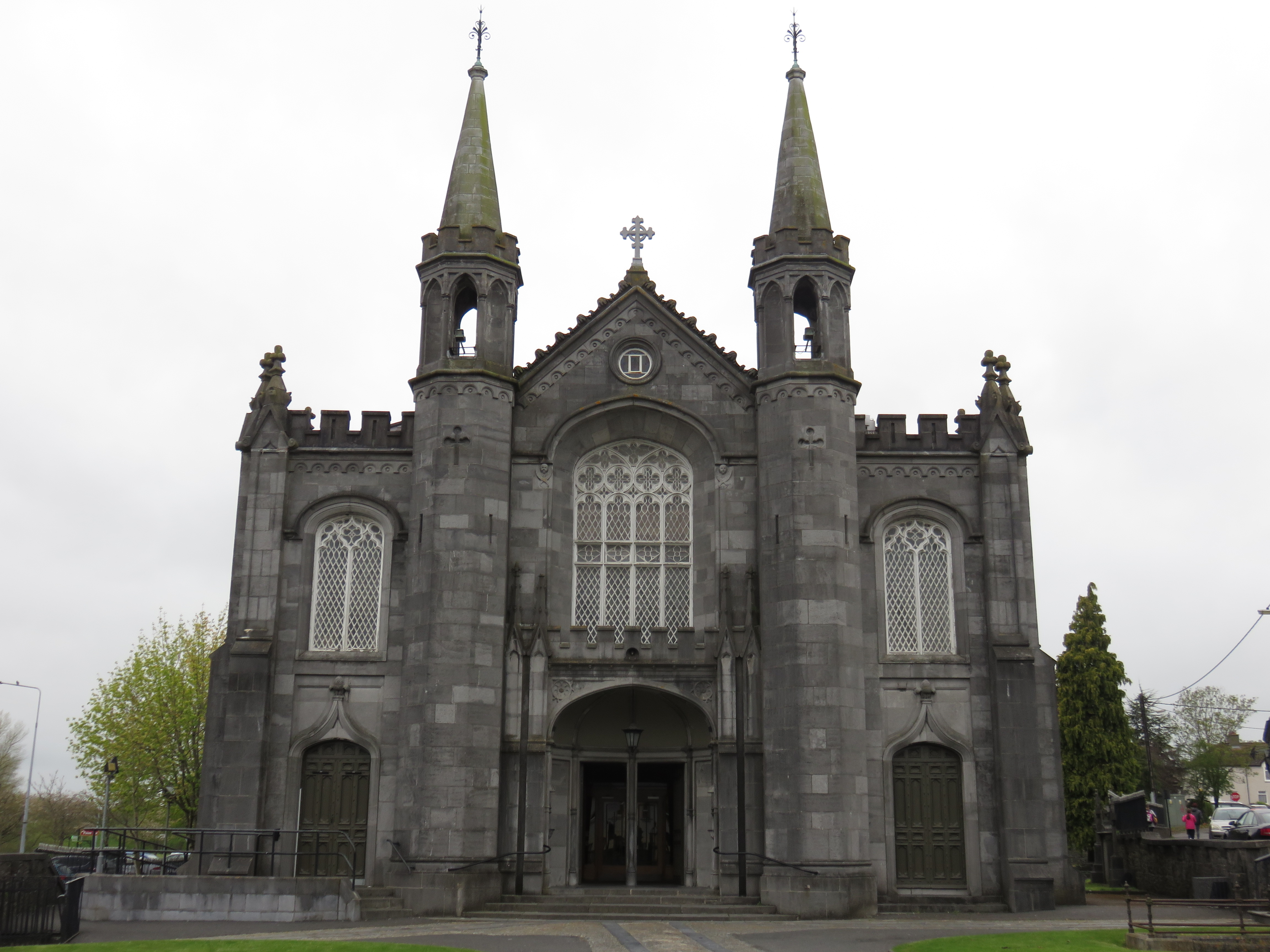
St. Canice's Church in 2018

The Diocese of Ossory (Latin: Dioecesis Ossoriensis; Irish: Deoise Osraí) is a Latin Church diocese of the Catholic Church in eastern Ireland. It is one of three suffragan dioceses in the ecclesiastical province of the Metropolitan Archbishop of Dublin and has been led by Gerard Nash since 2026.

The Cathedral church is St. Mary of the Assumption, in Kilkenny.

== Geographic remit ==
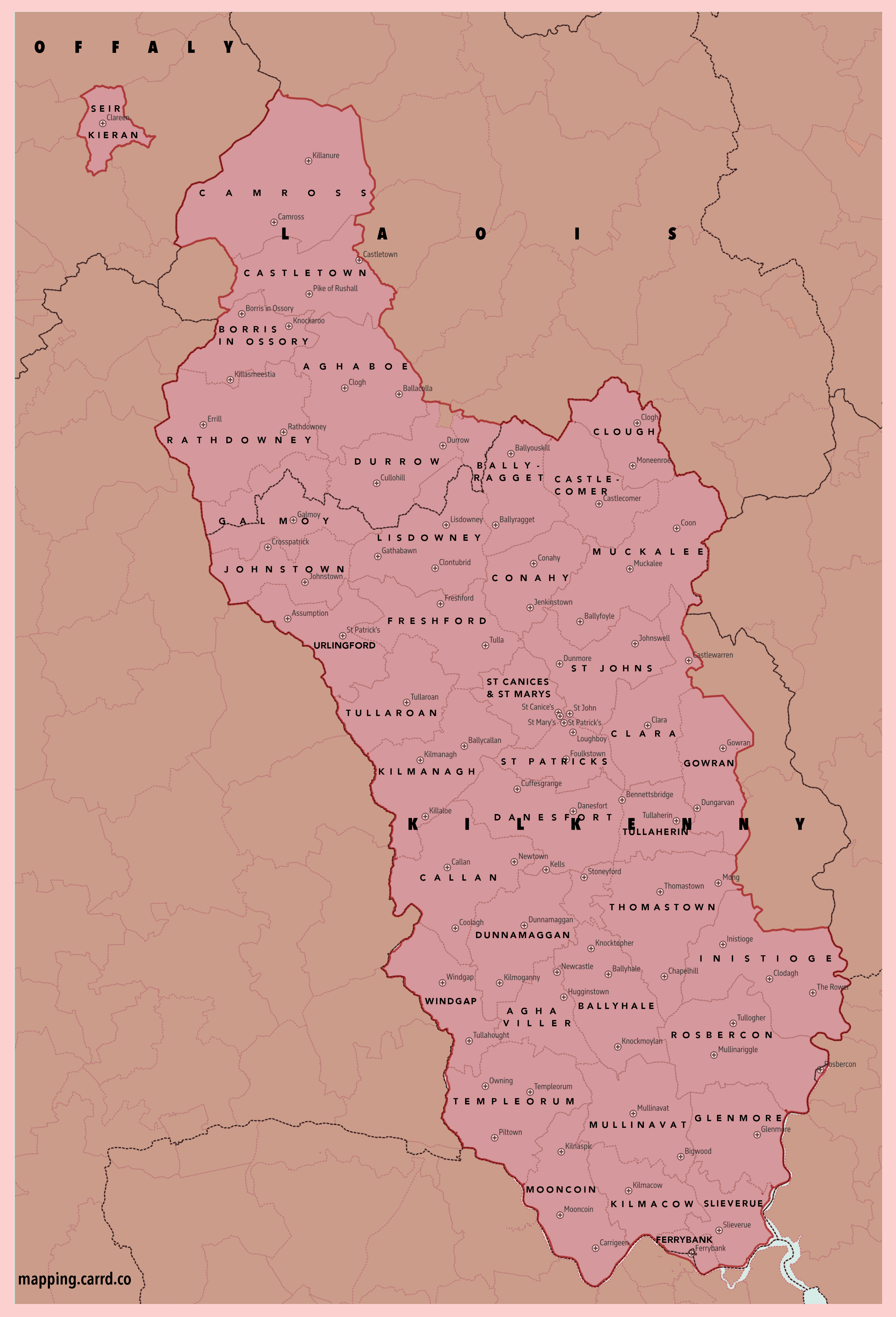
Map of the Diocese

The see is bounded to the south by the River Suir, to the east by the River Barrow, to the north by County Laois (formerly "Queen's County") and to the west by counties Tipperary and Offaly (formerly "King's County"). It has an area of 600,000 acres (2,400 km^{2}) and contains the city of Kilkenny.

At the Synod of Rathbreasail in 1111, the limits of the diocese were permanently fixed. At the same time, the cathedral was transferred from Seir-Kieran (Saighir, Offaly) to Aghaboe. At the end of the 12th century, it was further transferred to Kilkenny. It is probable that St. Canice founded a monastery at Kilkenny and not unlikely that the beginnings of a town soon appeared there, to become more important when the bishops changed from Aghaboe.

== History ==
=== Early history ===
The diocese was established in AD 1111 It is roughly co-extensive with the ancient Irish Kingdom of Ossory, whose first king, Óengus Osrithe, flourished in the 2nd century of the Christian era. His successors extended their boundaries to include part of Tipperary. In the 5th century, a neighbouring tribe, the Deisi, aided by the Corcu Loígde, conquered South Ossory, and for over a century, the Corcu Loígde chiefs ruled in place of the dispossessed Ossory chiefs. Early in the 7th century the ancient chiefs recovered much of their lost possessions, the foreigners were overcome, and the descendants of Aengus ruled once more. One of the greatest was Cerball mac Dúnlainge, prominent in the 9th century and distinguished in the Danish wars.

Ossory had been Christianized long before this. St. Ciarán, the patron saint of the diocese, was born about the 4th century at a place now known as "St. Ciarán's Strand", near Cape Clear Island, and was probably converted to the Catholic faith by foreign traders. According to tradition, he travelled to Rome and was there ordained priest and bishop. Having met St. Patrick, St. Ciarán received from him a bell with the charge to return to Ireland and there establish a monastery on the spot where the bell should first sound. When the saint had passed beyond Ossory, and was descending the western slopes of Slieve Bloom, the bell at length sounded; and here St. Ciarán established the monastery of Seir-Kieran (now Saighir, Offaly), the centre from which Ossory was evangelized. St. Patrick also visited Ossory and preached and founded churches there. There is some difficulty in accepting the story of St. Ciarán having preached before St. Patrick, since the former is said to have flourished in the 6th century. It is, however, certain that St. Ciarán laboured in Ossory.

In the centuries following, the kingdom was ruled from Seir-Kieran by the abbots. They had other monasteries subject to them, and probably other bishops, and perhaps were not always bishops themselves, though at Seir-Kieran, as at Iona, there was always a bishop. Their jurisdiction was tribal rather than territorial, and hence the diocese was enlarged or contracted as the fortunes of the Ossory chieftains rose or fell.

In the reign of Bishop Hugh de Rous (1202–15) the cathedral of St. Canice was built. Two subsequent bishops, Hugh de Malpilton (1251–60) and Thomas Barry (1427–60), filled the office of treasurer of Ireland, while another, Richard Northalis (1387–95), acted as King Richard II of England's ambassador abroad.

=== Reformation and Counter Reformation Ossory ===
At the English reformation, the Earls of Ormond were among the first of the nobility to conform to the state established church. The majority of the population continued to adhere to the old faith. When John Bale was appointed bishop by King Edward VI, he endeavoured to "Protestantise" the people. He was roughly handled and driven from Kilkenny, leaving Ossory in peace. The peace ended with the death of Queen Mary I. During the reign of Queen Elizabeth I, the see was vacant for seventeen years.

From 1602 to 1618 Ossory was again without a bishop. When Dr. David Rothe was appointed (1620) there was not a Catholic bishop in all of Ireland. In the rebellion of 1641 Kilkenny was the centre of national resistance and the headquarters of the Catholic Confederation. The part played by Dr. Rothe was prominent and patriotic; but his best efforts were unavailing, for Ormond was able to foment divisions between the Anglo-Irish and the old Irish who would not "blend" for the common good. For want of vigour in Catholic counsels, Ormonde's treachery led to Oliver Cromwell's victories. While the Cromwellians held Kilkenny, Dr. Rothe died there (1650) and for twenty years following, Ossory was governed by vicars. During the few periods of toleration in the reign of Charles II Stuart a feeble revival of religion took place. In 1678 the bishop reported to Rome, that in many cases one priest was in charge of five or six parishes; that the few remaining Franciscans, Dominicans, Jesuits and Capuchins ministered by stealth and in ruined churches; and that the Carmelites, Cistercians and Canons Regular of St. Augustine had completely disappeared.

In the penal times, Ossory suffered much, but its faith survived, and when toleration came it was ruled by an exceptional man, Thomas De Burgo (1759–86). Equally capable was his successor, John Thomas Troy (1777–86), subsequently Archbishop of Dublin. He praised King George III, and maintained friendships with the viceroy and with Henry Luttrell, son of Lord Carhampton. He was among the first of the Irish bishops to take advantage of the relaxation of the penal laws and set up a college for his diocese by the purchase of Burrell's Hall, Kilkenny.

=== Modern History ===
In 1836 the foundation stone of St. Kieran's College, Kilkenny, was laid and two years later the college was opened for students. Dr. Kinsella also laid the foundation stone of the Cathedral of St. Mary in 1843, though the exterior was not finished until 1857, nor solemnly consecrated until 1899.

Among those clerics connected to the diocese are: James Butler, Archbishop of Cashel, author of 'Butler's Catechism'; Patrick Manogue Bishop of Sacramento; Dr. Ireland, Archbishop of Saint Paul, Minnesota; John O'Reily Archbishop of Adelaide; Dr. John O'Donovan; Dr. Kelly, for many years professor of ecclesiastical history at Maynooth.

In 1994, the diocesan college St. Kieran's ceased to be a seminary after 212 years in operation.

== Adult Faith Development Group ==
The Adult faith development group is based in St. Kieran's. In 2021, the group in collaboration with the St. Patrick's Pontifical University, Maynooth, launched Aspal, a digital platform for faith formation It is supported by the Benefact Trust, and provides a number of free and paid courses online and via a mobile phone app. Aimed at both groups and individuals Aspal provides courses in Parish Administration, Ministers of the Word and Eucharist, and pathways to ministry.

== Episcopal ordinaries ==
The following is a basic list of the bishops of Ossory since 1829.

- William Kinsella (1829–1845)
- Edward Walsh (1846–1872)
- Patrick Francis Moran (1872–1884)
- Abraham Brownrigg, S.S.S. (1884–1928)
- Patrick Collier (1928–1964)
- Peter Birch (1964–1981)
- Laurence Forristal (1981–2007)
- Séamus Freeman, S.A.C. (2007–2016)
- Dermot Farrell (2018–2020)
- Niall Coll (2022–2026)
- Gerard Nash (2026–present)

== See also ==
- Catholic Church in Ireland
- Bishop of Ossory with full lists of bishops, Catholic and Anglican
- Diocese of Cashel and Ossory (Church of Ireland)

== Sources and external links ==
- GCatholic
