= Edward Walsh (bishop) =

Roman-catholic bishop

Edward Walsh (b Mooncoin 29 September 1791; d Kilkenny 11 August 1872) was an Irish Roman Catholic clergyman who served as the Bishop of Ossory from 1846 until his death.

He was educated at St Kieran's College, Kilkenny. He was on the staff of St Kieran's from 1817 until 1836: president from 1820. He was parish priest of Slieverue from 1836 until 1846. Walsh was ordained Bishop of Ossory on 26 July 1846, and served until his death.
