= Dermot Farrell =

Metropolitan Archbishop of Dublin

The Most Reverend Dr Dermot Farrell KC*HS
- Archbishop of Dublin; Primate of Ireland
- Church: Roman Catholic
- Archdiocese: Dublin
- Appointed: 29 December 2020
- Installed: 2 February 2021
- Predecessor: Diarmuid Martin
- Previous posts: Bishop of Ossory; Financial Secretary of the Irish Catholic Bishops' Conference; Vicar general of the Diocese of Meath; Parish priest of Dunboyne; President of St Patrick's College, Maynooth; Lecturer at St Patrick's College, Maynooth; Director of Formation at the Pontifical Irish College

Orders
- Ordination: 7 June 1980
- Consecration: 11 March 2018 by Diarmuid Martin

Personal details
- Born: Dermot Pius Farrell; 22 November 1954 (age 71) Castletown Geoghegan, County Westmeath, Ireland
- Parents: Dermot and Carmel Farrell
- Education: St Patrick's College, Maynooth; Pontifical Gregorian University
- Motto: Adjutorium nostrum in nomine Domini "Our help is in the name of the Lord"
- Coat of arms

Dermot Pius Farrell KC*HS (born 22 November 1954) is an Irish Roman Catholic prelate who has served as Archbishop of Dublin since 2021.

== Early life and education ==
Farrell was born in Garthy, Castletown Geoghegan, County Westmeath, on 22 November 1954, the eldest of seven children to Dermot and Carmel Farrell. He was baptised in the Cathedral of Christ the King, Mullingar, and attended primary school in Castletown Geoghegan and Streamstown and secondary school at St Finian's College, Mullingar.

Farrell began studying for the priesthood at St Patrick's College, Maynooth, in 1972, completing a Bachelor of Science in mathematics and physics from the National University of Ireland, Maynooth in 1976 and a Bachelor of Divinity from the Pontifical University in 1979.

He was ordained a priest for the Diocese of Meath on 7 June 1980.

== Presbyteral ministry ==
Following ordination, Farrell's first pastoral assignment was as a curate in the cathedral parish of Mullingar between 1981 and 1985. He completed a licentiate in theology from St Patrick's College, Maynooth between 1979 and 1981, before completing doctoral studies at the Pontifical Gregorian University in Rome between 1985 and 1988, where his doctoral thesis explored the dogmatic foundations of Bernhard Häring's dialogical approach to Catholic moral theology as a sacramental way of life. During his final year in Rome, Farrell also served as director of formation in the Pontifical Irish College.

He returned to Ireland in 1989, serving as a curate in Tullamore and lecturing in moral theology at St Patrick's College, Maynooth. While continuing to lecture in moral theology, Farrell was appointed executive assistant to the president of the university in 1990. He was subsequently appointed vice-president on 13 October 1993 and president on 9 December 1996, following the sudden death of his predecessor, Matthew O'Donnell.

He was appointed Prelate of Honour of His Holiness on 6 June 1997, and made a member of the Order of the Holy Sepulchre in 1998 before being promoted to the rank of Grand Officer in 2018.

=== President of St Patrick's College ===
Following the creation of the National University of Ireland from the separation of the faculties of Arts, Celtic Studies and Philosophy and Science from St Patrick's College by the Universities Act, 1997, Farrell remained president of the pontifical university, presiding over the revision of the formation programme Pastores Dabo Vobis and supervising the renovation of its heritage buildings.

Following media reports in 2002 surrounding the resignation of his predecessor, Micheál Ledwith, in 1994, Farrell made public the circumstances of Ledwith's departure, that he had been accused of sexually abusing a minor and reached a confidential financial settlement with his accuser.

Following the invitation of controversial American theologian, Charles Curran, to speak at a conference sponsored by the university in 2006, Farrell stated that he had been neither consulted about, nor informed of, the invitation.

=== Return to pastoral ministry ===
Farrell retired as President of St Patrick's College in 2007 and returned to pastoral ministry in the Diocese of Meath, when he was appointed parish priest in Dunboyne. He was appointed vicar general of the diocese in 2009.

== Episcopal ministry ==
=== Bishop of Ossory ===
Farrell was appointed Bishop of Ossory by Pope Francis on 3 January 2018, and consecrated by the Archbishop of Dublin, Diarmuid Martin, on 11 March in St Mary's Cathedral, Kilkenny.

Farrell became a member of the standing committee of the Irish Catholic Bishops' Conference, and subsequently its Financial Secretary in March 2019.

=== Archbishop of Dublin ===
Farrell was appointed Archbishop of Dublin by Pope Francis on 29 December 2020, continuing to serve as Apostolic Administrator of Ossory until his installation on 2 February 2021 in St Mary's Pro-Cathedral, Dublin.

Soon after his archiepiscopal appointment, Farrell told The Irish Times that while he is in favour of opening the diaconate to women, he also claimed not to be against the ordination of women. However, he feared that such move could cause a schism in the church, as it had in the Church of England and the Episcopal Church. He also called for a more flexible approach towards celibacy, similar to the one adopted by the Eastern Orthodox Churches.

In 2021 when it came to same-sex blessings, he said that such situations should be dealt with “individually and pastorally”, lamenting that such blessings "are very often misconstrued as marriage".

Following the release of Fiducia Supplicans, Farrell said couples in so-called irregular unions cannot be refused a blessing. He stated “prudence and attention to the ecclesial context and to the local culture” could allow for different forms of blessing, but not for “a total or definitive denial”.

In 2024 Farrell said that until the sexual abuse crisis is fully addressed, there will not be “authentic, enduring renewal and reform” in the Church. Speaking at Saint Mary’s Pro-Cathedral he spoke of a “culture of denial” with respect to sexual abuse.

Catholic Church titles
Preceded by Diarmuid Martin	Archbishop of Dublin since 2021	Succeeded by Incumbent
Preceded by Séamus Freeman	Bishop of Ossory; 2018–2020	Succeeded by Niall Coll
Order of precedence in Northern Ireland
Preceded by Eamon Martin; Archbishop of Armagh (Roman Catholic)	Gentlemen; Roman Catholic Archbishop of Dublin	Succeeded by Michael Jackson; Archbishop of Dublin (Church of Ireland)
