= Bishop of Ossory =

Ordinary of the diocese of Ossory

- Bishopric

catholic
- Coat of arms
- Incumbent; Gerard Nash since 29 July 2026
- Style: Your Lordship

Location
- Country: Ireland

Information
- First holder: Domnall Ua Fogartaig
- Established: 1111
- Cathedral: St. Mary's Cathedral, Kilkenny

Website
- ossory.ie

The Bishop of Ossory (Irish: Easpag Osraí) is an episcopal title which takes its name after the ancient of Kingdom of Ossory in the Province of Leinster, Ireland. In the Catholic Church it remains a separate title, but in the Church of Ireland belonging to the Anglican Communion it has been united with other bishoprics.

== History ==
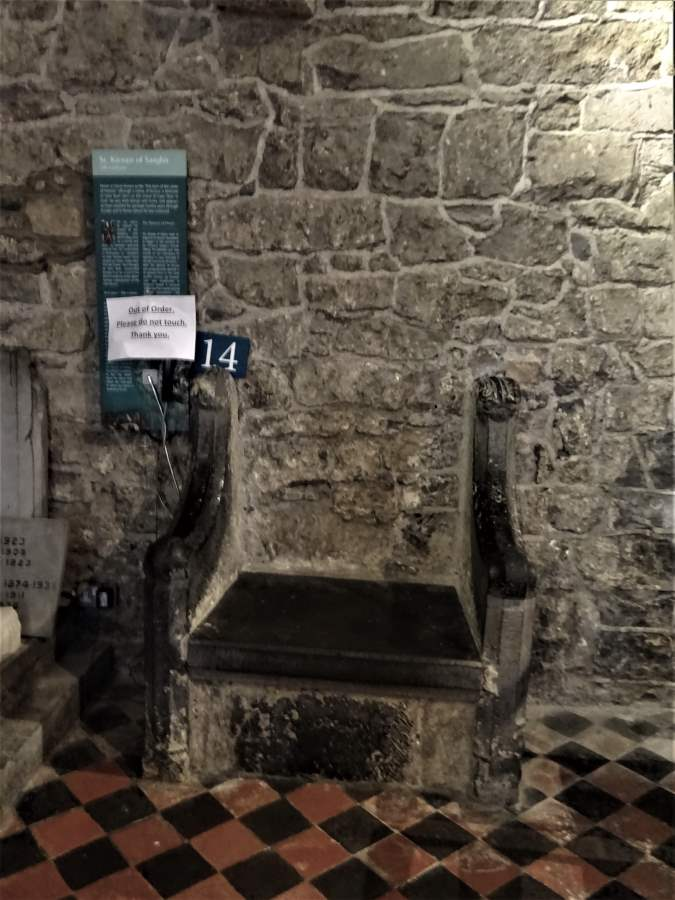
Ancient stone cathedra of the Bishops of Ossory in St Canice's Cathedral.

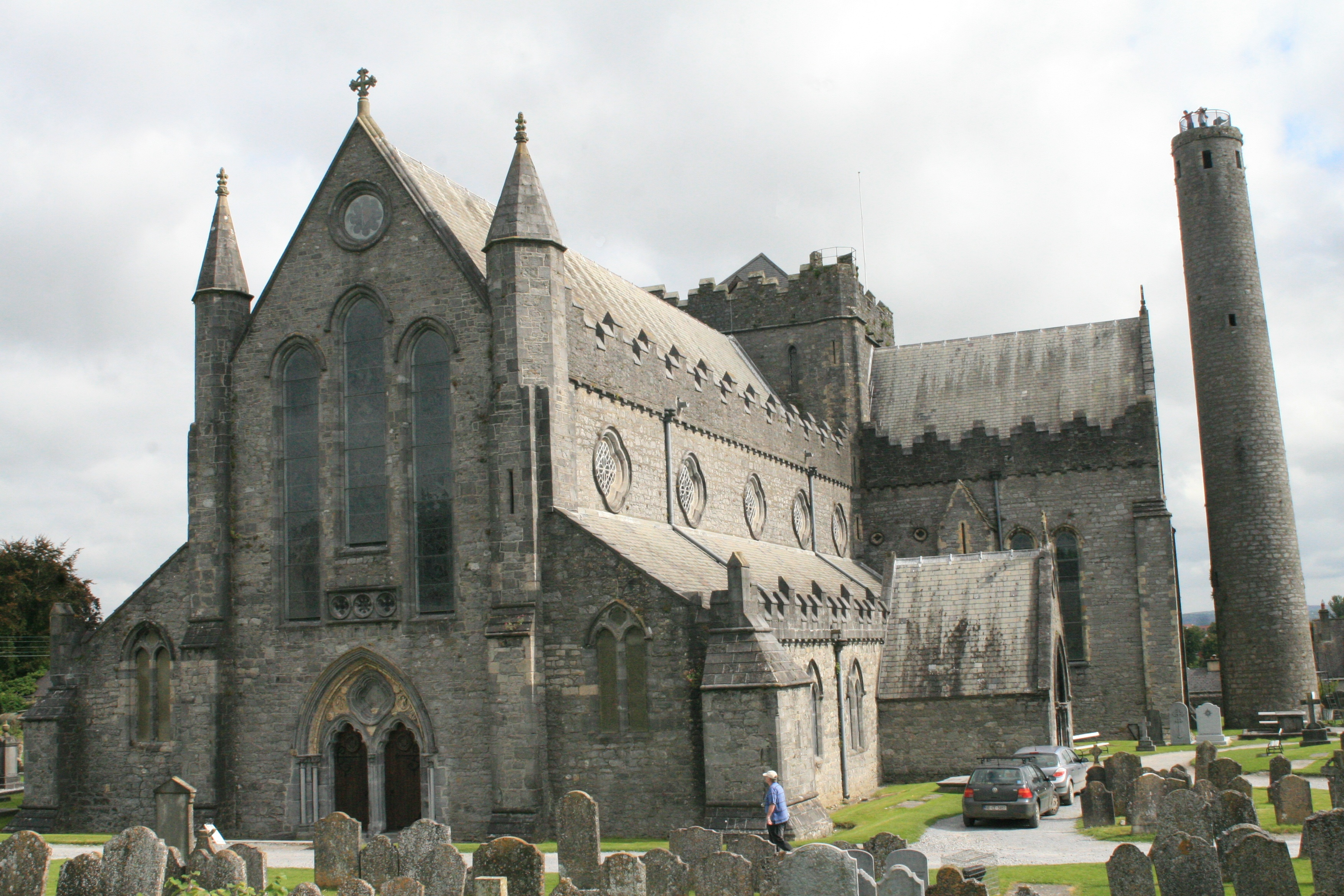
St Canice's Cathedral, Kilkenny, the episcopal seat of the pre-Reformation and Church of Ireland bishops.

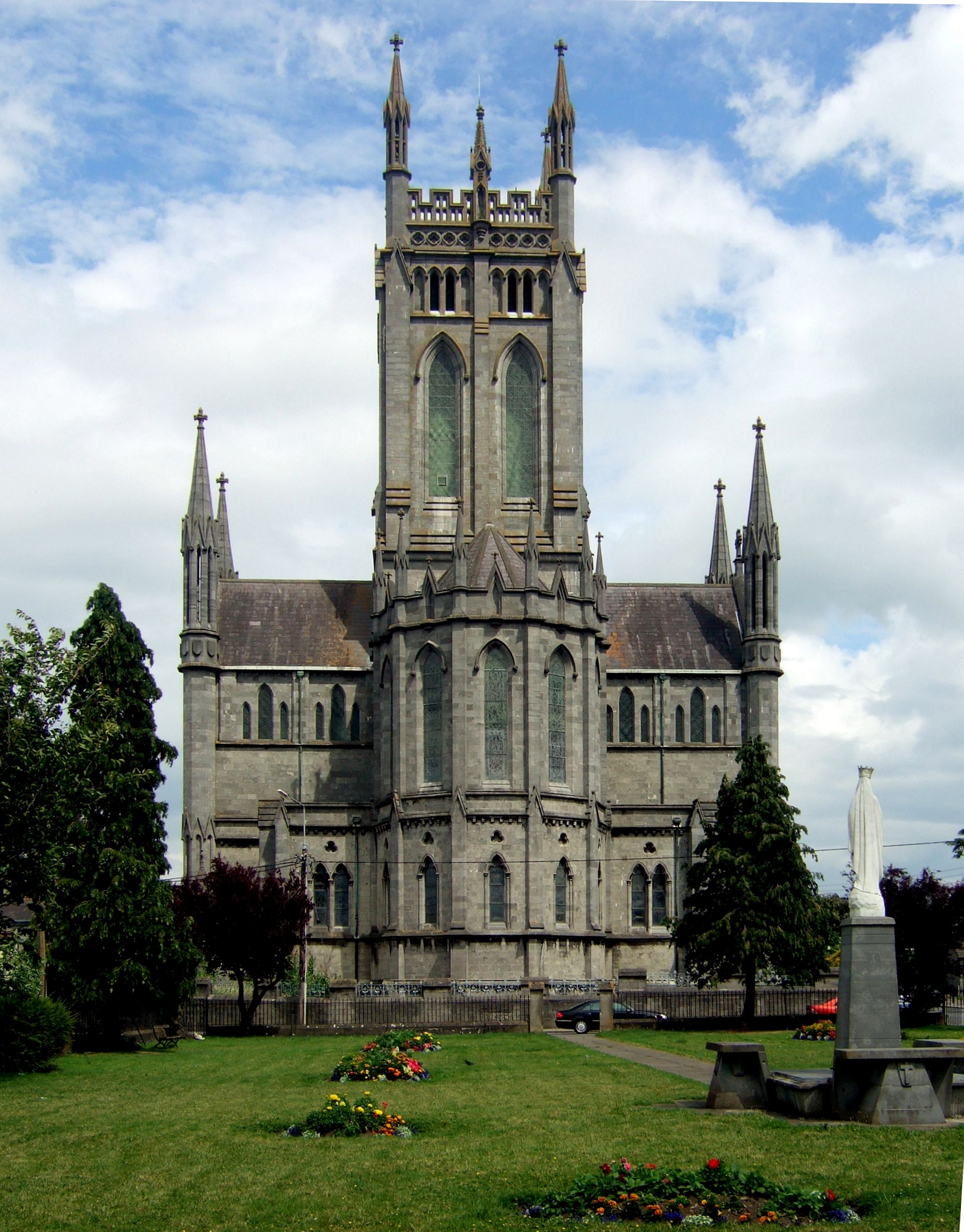
St. Mary's Cathedral, Kilkenny, the episcopal seat of the Catholic Church bishops

The diocese of Ossory was one of the twenty-four dioceses established at the Synod of Rathbreasail in 1111 and coincided with the ancient Kingdom of Ossory (Osraige); this is unusual, as Christian dioceses are almost always named for cities, not for regions. The episcopal see has always been in Kilkenny, the capital of Ossory at the time of the Synod of Rathbreasail. The erroneous belief that the cathedral was originally further north at Aghaboe is traced by John Bradley to a 16th-century misinterpretation of a 13th-century property transfer, combined with the fact that the abbey at the site which became St Canice's Cathedral, Kilkenny, was a daughter house of Aghaboe Abbey.

Following the Reformation, there were parallel apostolic successions. In the Church of Ireland, the see of Ossory combined with Ferns and Leighlin to form the united bishopric of Ossory, Ferns and Leighlin in 1835.

In the Catholic Church, the title continues as a separate bishopric. The bishop's seat (cathedra) is located at St. Mary's Cathedral, Kilkenny. The current Ordinary is the Most Reverend Niall Coll, who was appointed by the Holy See on 28 October 2022 and ordained bishop on 29 December 2022.

== Pre-diocesan succession ==
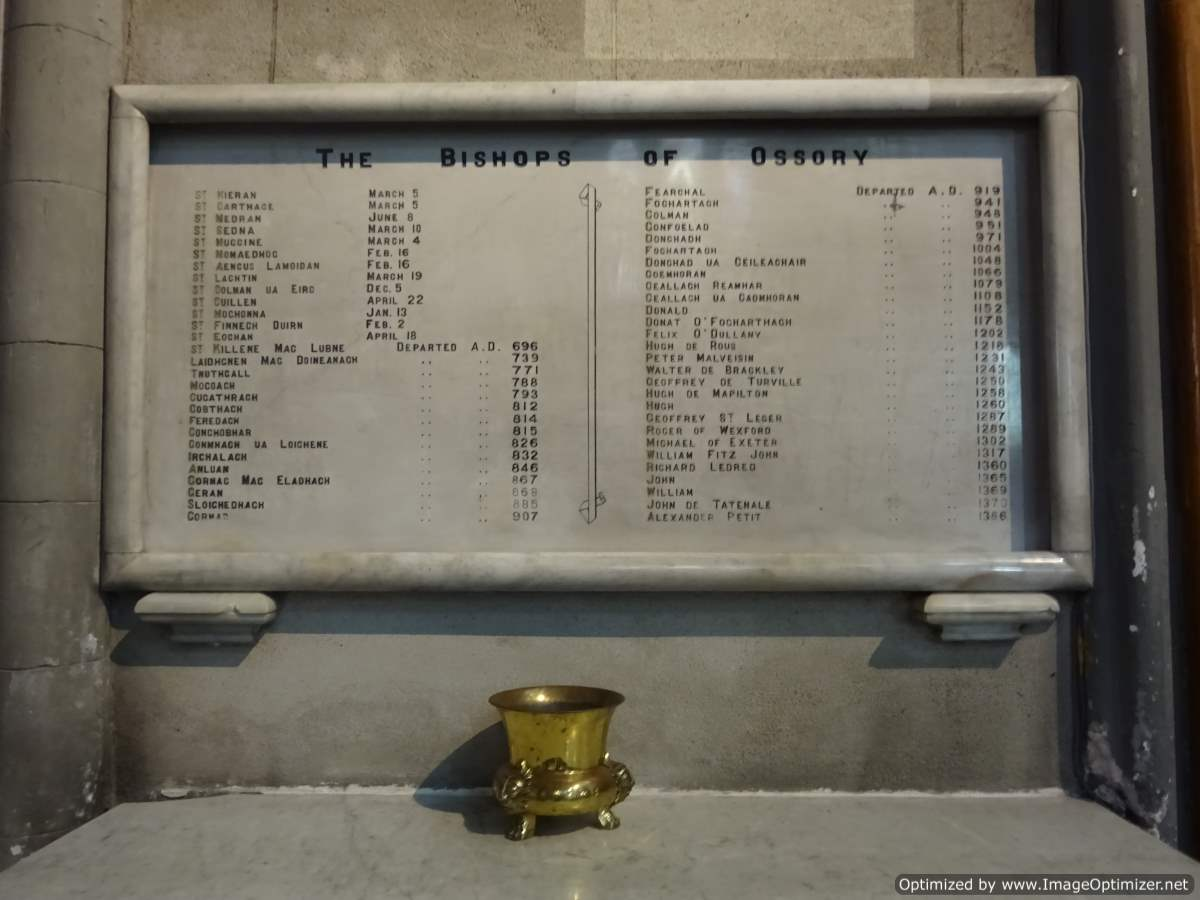
List of bishops up to 1386. Note the change from Gaelic names to Norman and English names after the Norman conquest of Ireland

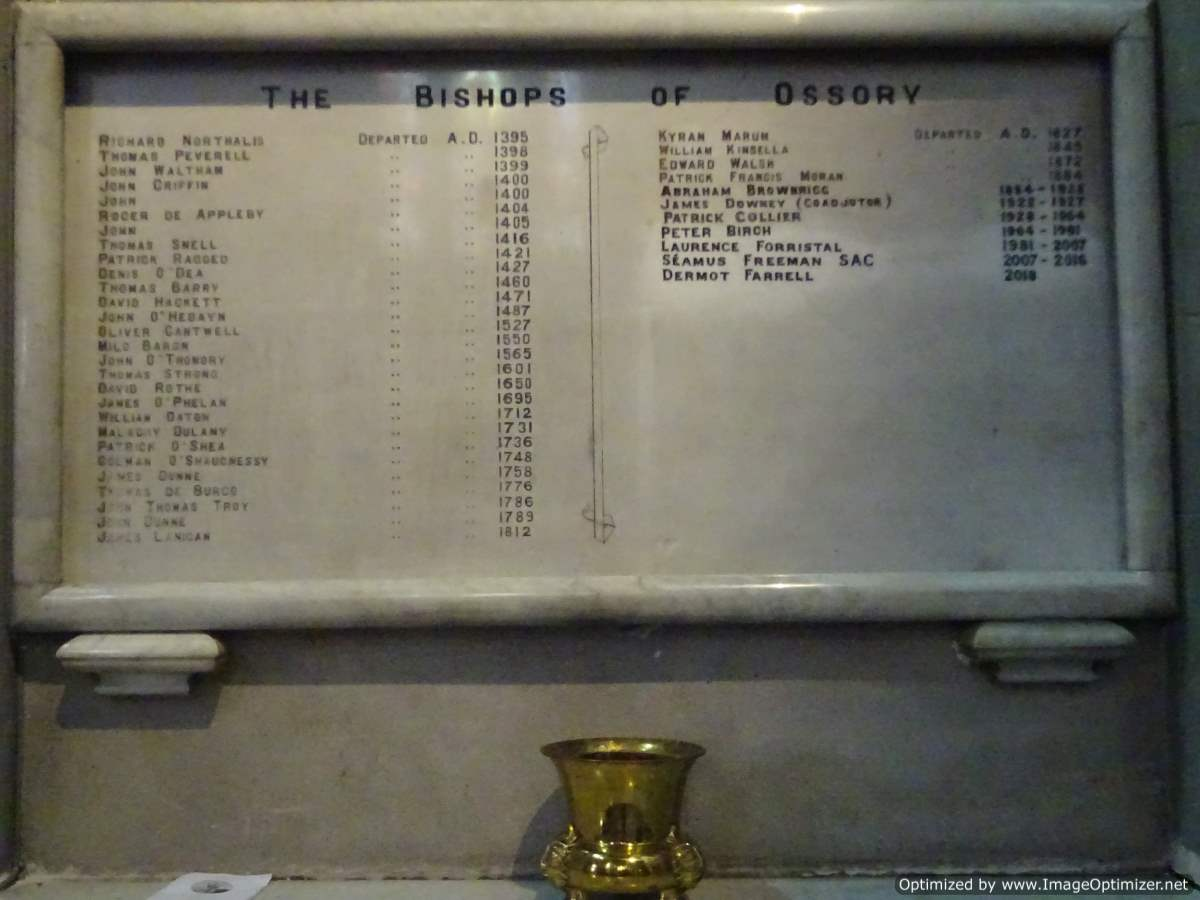
List of bishops from 1386 onward — Catholic succession

The following list of bishops is inscribed in St Mary's Cathedral, Kilkenny and was listed on the Catholic diocese's website. Bishops in the early Irish church ruled over a kingdom, in this case, Osraige or Ossory, but were also often associated with a particular monastery and may have been in some matters subordinate to its abbot.

- St. Ciarán of Saigir (Kieran) (Feast date: 5 March) According to his vitae, St. Ciarán was ordained to the episcopate by Pope Celestine I.
- St. Carthage (Feast date: 5 March)
- St. Medran (Feast date: 8 June)
- St. Sedna (Feast date: 10 March)
- St. Muccine (Feast date: 4 March)
- St. Modomnoc (Feast date: 13 February)
- St. Aengus Lamoidan (Feast date: 16 February)
- St. Lachtin (Feast date: 19 March)
- St. Colman Ua Eirc (Feast date: 22 April)
- St. Cuillen (Feast date: 22 April)
- St. Bochonna (Feast date: 13 January)
- St. Finnech Duirn (Feast date: 2 February)
- St. Eochan (Feast date: 18 April)
- St. Killene Mac Lubne (d. 696)
- Laidhgnen Mac Doinlanach (d. 739)
- Tnuthgall (d. 771)
- Mocoach (d. 788)
- Cucathrach (d. 793)
- Cothach (d. 812)
- Fereoach (d. 814)
- Conchobhar (d. 815)
- Conmhach Ua Loichene (d. 826)
- Inchalach (d. 832)
- Anluan (d. 846)
- Cormac Mac Eladhach (d. 867)
- Ceran Departed (d. 868)
- Sloidhedhach (d. 885)
- Cormac (d. 907)
- Fearchal (d. 919)
- Fochartach (d. 941)
- Colman (d. 948)
- Confoelad (d. 951)
- Donchadh (d. 971)
- Fochartach (d. 1004)
- Donchad Ua Celieachair (d. 1048)
- Comhoran (d. 1066)
- Ceallack Reamhar (d. 1079)
- Ceallack Ua Caonhoran (d. 1108)

== Pre-Reformation bishops ==
Pre-Reformation Bishops of Ossory
| From | Until | Ordinary | Notes |
|---|---|---|---|
| bef.1152 | 1178 | Domnall Ua Fogartaig | Became bishop before March 1152; died 1178 |
| bef.1180 | 1202 | Felix Ua Duib Sláin, Cistercians (O.Cist.) | Became bishop before 1180; died 24 January 1202 |
| c.1202 | 1218 | Hugo de Rous, Order of Saint Augustine (O.S.A.) | Became bishop c. 1202; died before December 1218; also recorded as Hugo Rufus |
| 1218 | 1231 | Peter Mauveisin, O.S.A. | Elected before 8 December 1218; consecrated after 31 August 1220; died before March 1231 |
| 1231 | 1232 | William of Kilkenny | Elected after 16 March 1231; resigned before May 1232 |
| 1232 | 1243 | Walter de Brackley | Elected before 13 June 1232; consecrated before 15 July 1233; died before 12 October 1243 |
| 1244 | 1250 | Geoffrey de Turville | Elected after 5 February 1244; consecrated before 28 October 1245; died before 18 October 1250 |
| 1251 | 1260 | Hugh de Malpilton | Elected before 17 April 1251; consecrated after 20 August 1251; died before 4 June 1260 |
| 1260 | 1287 | Geoffrey St Leger | Elected before 29 June 1260; died 10 January 1287 |
| 1287 | 1289 | Roger of Wexford | Elected before 22 June 1287; consecrated 3 November 1287; died 28 June 1289 |
| 1289 | 1302 | Michael d'Exeter | Elected 28 September 1289; died 12 July 1302 |
| 1302 | 1317 | William FitzJohn | Elected 10 September 1302; consecrated after 6 January 1303; translated to Metropolitan see Cashel 26 March 1317 |
| 1317 | 1361 | Richard de Ledrede, Friars Minor (O.F.M.) | Appointed 24 April 1317; consecrated c. May 1317; died c. 1361 |
| 1361 | 1364 | John de Tatenhale, Dominican Order (O.P.) | Appointed 8 November 1361; consecrated before 14 December 1361; died after March 1364 |
| 1366 | unknown | William | Became bishop before February 1366 |
| unknown | 1370 | John of Oxford, Order of Saint Augustine (O.E.S.A.) | died c. 1370/- |
| 1370 | 1386 | Alexander de Balscot or le Petit | Elected c. 1370 and appointed 9 February 1371; translated to Meath c. 10 March 1386 |
| 1386 | 1395 | Richard Northalis, Carmelites (O.Carm.) | Elected 1386, appointed before 17 February 1387 and consecrated 4 December 1387; translated to Metropolitan see of Dublin 25 October 1395 |
| 1395 | 1398 | Thomas Peverel, O.Carm. | Appointed 25 October 1395; translated to Llandaff 2 July 1398, later Bishop of Worcester (England) (1407.07.04 – 1419.03) |
| 1398 | 1400 | John Waltham, O.S.A. (first time) | Appointed 1 February 1398; translated to Dromore 14 May 1400 |
| 1399 | 1400 | John Griffin | Translated from Leighlin 2 July 1399; died c. March 1400 |
| 1400 | | John | Appointed before 14 May 1400; died after 8 June 1400 |
| 1400 | 1402 | Roger Appleby, O.S.A. | Appointed 26 September 1400; resigned October 1402; later Bishop of Dromore (Northern Ireland) (1402.10.11 – 1407), finally Bishop of Waterford and Lismore (Ireland) (1407 – death 1409) |
| 1402 | 1405 | John Waltham, O.S.A. (again) | Translated from Dromore 9 or 11 October 1402; died 5 November 1405 |
| 1405 | 1407 | See vacant | |
| 1407 | 1417 | Thomas Snell | Translated from Waterford and Lismore (Bishop since 1400.05.26) 11 March 1407; died 16 October 1417 |
| 1417 | 1421 | Patrick Foxe | Translated from Cork (uncanonical Bishop since 1409.10.14) on 15 December 1417; died 20 April 1421 |
| 1421 | 1426 | Dionysius Ó Deadhaidh | Appointed 4 July 1421; died before 12 December 1426 |
| 1427 | 1460 | Thomas Barry | Appointed 19 February 1427; died 3 March 1460 |
| 1460 | 1478 | David Hackett | Appointed 4 July 1460; died 24 October 1478 |
| 1479 | 1487 | Seán Ó hÉidigheáin | Appointed 15 January and consecrated 21 February 1479; died 6 January 1487 |
| 1487 | 1527 | Oliver Cantwell, O.P. | Appointed 26 March 1487; died 9 January 1527 |

== Bishops during the Reformation ==
Bishops of Ossory during the Reformation
| From | Until | Ordinary | Notes |
|---|---|---|---|
| 1528 | 1550 | Milo Baron, O.S.A. | Appointed 8 June 1528; also held in commendam the priory of Inistioge until the dissolution of religious houses, when surrendered it to King Henry VIII; swore the Oath of Supremacy at Clonmel early in 1539.; died sometime between 1 July and 27 September 1550; also known Milo Fitzgerald |
| 1552 | 1553 | John Bale | Nominated by King Edward VI 22 October 1552; consecrated 2 February 1553; compelled to flee under Queen Mary I in September 1553; died November 1563 |
| 1553 | 1565 | John Tonory, O.S.A. | Nominated in December 1553 by Queen Mary I and consecrated January 1554. Allegiance to the papacy was restored on 29 November 1554, but after the accession of Queen Elizabeth I his position is uncertain. He died in 1565. |

== Post-Reformation Roman Catholic succession ==
Roman Catholic Bishops of Ossory
| From | Until | Ordinary | Notes |
|---|---|---|---|
| 1565 | 1582 | See vacant | |
| 1582 | 1602 | Thomas Strong | Appointed 28 March and consecrated 5 April 1582; appointed Auxiliary Bishop of Archdiocese of Santiago de Compostela in Spain 20 January 1597; died 20 January 1602 |
| 1603 | 1609 | William Brenan, Friars Minor (O.F.M.) | Appointed vicar apostolic by papal brief 13 November 1603; died in Flanders c. 1609 |
| 1609 | 1620 | See vacant | During this period there were no bishops or vicars apostolic. Laurence Reneghan was vicar general of Ossory 1609–1613; followed by Luke Archer, O.Cist., who was also vicar apostolic of Leighlin and titular abbot of Holy Cross |
| 1620 | 1650 | David Rothe | Appointed 1 October 1618 and consecrated 1620; died 20 April 1650 |
| 1657 | 1668 | Terence Fitzpatrick | Appointed vicar apostolic by papal 17 April 1657; died c. 1668 |
| 1669 | 1695 | James Phelan | Appointed 11 January and consecrated 1 August 1669; died January 1695 |
| 1696 | 1712 | William Daton | Appointed 20 February 1696; died 26 January 1712; also recorded as William Dalton |
| 1713 | 1731 | Malachy Dulany | Appointed 20 September 1713 and consecrated 17 February 1714; died May 1731 |
| 1731 | 1736 | Patrick Shee | Appointed 28 July 1731; died June. 1736 |
| 1736 | 1748 | Colman O'Shaughnessy, O.P. | Appointed 5 October 1736; died 2 September 1748 |
| 1748 | 1758 | James Bernard Dunne | Appointed 17 December 1748; died 30 April 1758 |
| 1759 | 1776 | Thomas Burke, O.P. | Appointed 9 January and consecrated 22 April 1759; died 25 September 1776; also recorded as Thomas de Burgo |
| 1776 | 1786 | John Thomas Troy, O.P. | Appointed 16 December 1776 and consecrated 8 June 1777; translated to Metropolitan see of Dublin 3 December 1786 (till death 1823.05.11) |
| 1787 | 1789 | John Dunne | Appointed 13 July and consecrated 16 September 1787; died 15 March 1789 |
| 1789 | 1812 | James Lanigan | Appointed 10 July and consecrated 21 September 1789; died 11 February 1812 |
| 1812 | 1814 | See vacant | |
| 1814 | 1827 | Kyran Marum | Appointed 4 October 1814 and consecrated 5 March 1815; died 22 December 1827 |
| 1827 | 1829 | See vacant | |
| (1829) | | (Miles Murphy) | Appointed 8 June 1828 and by papal brief 5 March 1829, however, the appointment was not accepted |
| 1829 | 1845 | William Kinsella | Appointed 15 May and consecrated 26 July 1829; died 12 December 1845 |
| 1846 | 1872 | Edward Walsh | Appointed 24 April and consecrated 26 July 1846; died 11 August 1872 |
| 1872 | 1884 | Patrick Francis Moran | Appointed coadjutor bishop 28 December 1871 (and Titular Bishop of Olba) and consecrated 5 March 1872; succeeded 11 August 1872; translated to Metropolitan see Sydney, Australia 14 March 1884 (till death 1911.08.16), created Cardinal-Priest of S. Susanna on 1885.07.30 |
| 1884 | 1928 | Abraham Brownrigg, Congregation of the Blessed Sacrament (S.S.S.) | Appointed 28 October and consecrated 14 December 1884; died 1 October 1928 |
| 1928 | 1964 | Patrick Collier | Appointed coadjutor bishop 18 May (and Titular Bishop of Himeria) and consecrated 5 August 1928; succeeded 1 October 1928; died 10 January 1964 |
| 1964 | 1981 | Peter Birch | Appointed coadjutor bishop 24 July (and Titular Bishop of Dibon) and consecrated 23 September 1962; succeeded 10 January 1964; died 7 March 1981 |
| 1981 | 2007 | Laurence Forristal | Previously Auxiliary Bishop of Dublin 1979–1981 (Titular Bishop of Rotdon); appointed Bishop of Ossory 30 June 1981; retired 14 September 2007; died 10 October 2018 |
| 2007 | 2016 | Séamus Freeman, Pallottines (S.A.C.) | Appointed 14 September and consecrated 2 December 2007; retired 29 July 2016; died 20 August 2022 |
| 2016 | 2018 | See vacant | |
| 2018 | 2020 | Dermot Farrell | Appointed 3 January and consecrated 11 March 2018; translated to Dublin 29 December 2020 |
| 2022 | 2026 | Niall Coll | Appointed 28 October and consecrated 29 December 2022; translated to Raphoe 25 January 2026. |
| 2026 | present | Gerard Nash | Appointed 29 July and began ministry 13 September 2026. |

== Church of Ireland succession ==
Church of Ireland Bishops of Ossory
| From | Until | Ordinary | Notes |
|---|---|---|---|
| 1566 | 1576 | Christopher Gaffney | Nominated 4 December 1566 and consecrated May 1567; died 3 August 1576 |
| 1578 | 1585 | Nicholas Walsh | Appointed by letters patent 23 January 1578 and consecrated February 1578; murdered 14 December 1585 |
| 1586 | 1610 | John Horsfall | Nominated 1 August 1586 and appointed by letters patent 15 September 1586; died 13 February 1610 |
| 1610 | 1613 | Richard Deane | Nominated 7 March 1610 and appointed by letters patent 18 April 1610; died 20 February 1613 |
| 1613 | 1640 | Jonas Wheeler | Nominated 14 March 1613 and consecrated 8 May 1613; died 19 April 1640 |
| 1641 | 1672 | Griffith Williams | Nominated 19 July 1641 and consecrated 26 September 1641; died 29 March 1672 |
| 1672 | 1677 | John Parry | Nominated 5 April 1672 and consecrated 28 April 1672; died 21 December 1677 |
| 1677 | 1678 | Benjamin Parry | Nominated 29 December 1677 and consecrated 27 January 1678; died 4 October 1678 |
| 1678 | 1680 | Michael Ward | Nominated 25 October 1678 and consecrated 24 November 1678; translated to Derry 22 January 1680 |
| 1680 | 1693 | Thomas Otway | Translated from Killala and Achonry; nominated 6 January 1680 and appointed by letters patent 7 February 1680; died 6 March 1693 |
| 1693 | 1714 | John Hartstonge | Nominated 16 March 1693 and consecrated 2 July 1693; translated to Derry 3 March 1714 |
| 1714 | 1730 | Sir Thomas Vesey, Bt. | Translated from Killaloe; nominated 18 February and appointed by letters patent 28 April 1714; died 6 August 1730 |
| 1730 | 1735 | Edward Tenison | Nominated 11 September 1730 and consecrated 4 July 1731; died 29 November 1735 |
| 1735 | 1740 | Charles Este | Nominated 17 December 1735 and consecrated 1 February 1736; translated to Waterford and Lismore 4 October 1740 |
| 1741 | 1743 | Anthony Dopping | Nominated 19 June 1741 and consecrated 19 July 1741; died 1 February 1743 |
| 1743 | 1754 | Michael Cox | Nominated 15 February and consecrated 29 May 1743; translated to Cashel 22 January 1754 |
| 1754 | 1756 | Edward Maurice | Nominated 3 January and consecrated 27 January 1754; died 10 February 1756 |
| 1756 | 1765 | Richard Pococke | Nominated 5 March and consecrated 21 March 1756; translated to Meath 16 July 1765 |
| 1765 | 1775 | Charles Dodgson | Nominated 22 June and consecrated 11 August 1765; translated to Elphin 12 April 1775 |
| 1775 | 1779 | William Newcome | Translated from Dromore; nominated 23 March and appointed by letters patent 13 April 1775; translated to Waterford and Lismore 5 November 1779 |
| 1779 | 1782 | John Hotham | Nominated 22 October and consecrated 14 November 1779; translated to Clogher 17 May 1782 |
| 1782 | 1794 | Hon. William Beresford | Translated from Dromore; nominated 11 April and appointed by letters patent 21 May 1782; translated Tuam 10 October 1794 |
| 1795 | 1798 | Thomas Lewis O'Beirne | Nominated 17 January and consecrated 1 February 1795; translated to Meath 18 December 1798 |
| 1799 | 1805 | Hugh Hamilton | Translated from Clonfert; nominated 15 January and appointed by letters patent 24 January 1799; died 1 December 1805 |
| 1806 | 1813 | John Kearney | Nominated 4 January and consecrated 2 February 1806; died 22 May 1813 |
| 1813 | 1841 | Robert Fowler | Nominated 7 January and consecrated 20 June 1813; became bishop of Ossory, Ferns and Leighlin when the dioceses were united on 12 July 1835; died 31 December 1841 |
In 1835, the Church of Ireland see became part of the united bishopric of Ossory, Ferns and Leighlin
