= Peter Birch (bishop) =

Irish Roman Catholic bishop (1911–1981)

Right Reverend Peter Birch (4 September 1911 – 7 March 1981) was the Catholic Bishop of Ossory from 1964 until his death in 1981.

He was known for his activism on behalf of social and community services. He served as a guide and mentor to Sister Stanislaus Kennedy who, in 1974, was appointed by the Irish Government as the first chair of the National Committee on Pilot Schemes to Combat Poverty.

== Early life and education ==
Birch was born in 1911 in Tullowglass, Jenkinstown, County Kilkenny to a farming family, the eldest of five children. He began his education in Clinstown National School in 1916, and later was educated at St Kieran's College, Kilkenny and St Patrick's College, Maynooth, where he was ordained in 1937.

Following ordination he gained a Higher Diploma in Education and in 1938 joined the teaching staff at St Kieran's College. After writing about the history of St Kieran's, he received a Master of Arts in English before earning a doctorate, and was later appointed to the staff of St Patrick's College, Maynooth, and as a professor of Education and Lecturer in Catechetics in 1953.

== Episcopal ministry ==
In 1962, Birch was appointed as the Coadjutor Bishop of Ossory, Ireland. In 1964, he became Bishop of Ossory, instrumental in the establishment of the Diocesan Social Services.

One sympathetic profile noted how he came to be regarded as an outsider in the socially conservative Irish hierarchy: "Devoted to the progressive ideals of Vatican II, he encouraged an open, active catholicism, which made him an unpopular, and often peripheral, figure in the Irish hierarchy. His support for the travelling community and his calls for an improvement in the conditions of rural women further alienated him from prevailing catholic orthodoxy."

== Death ==
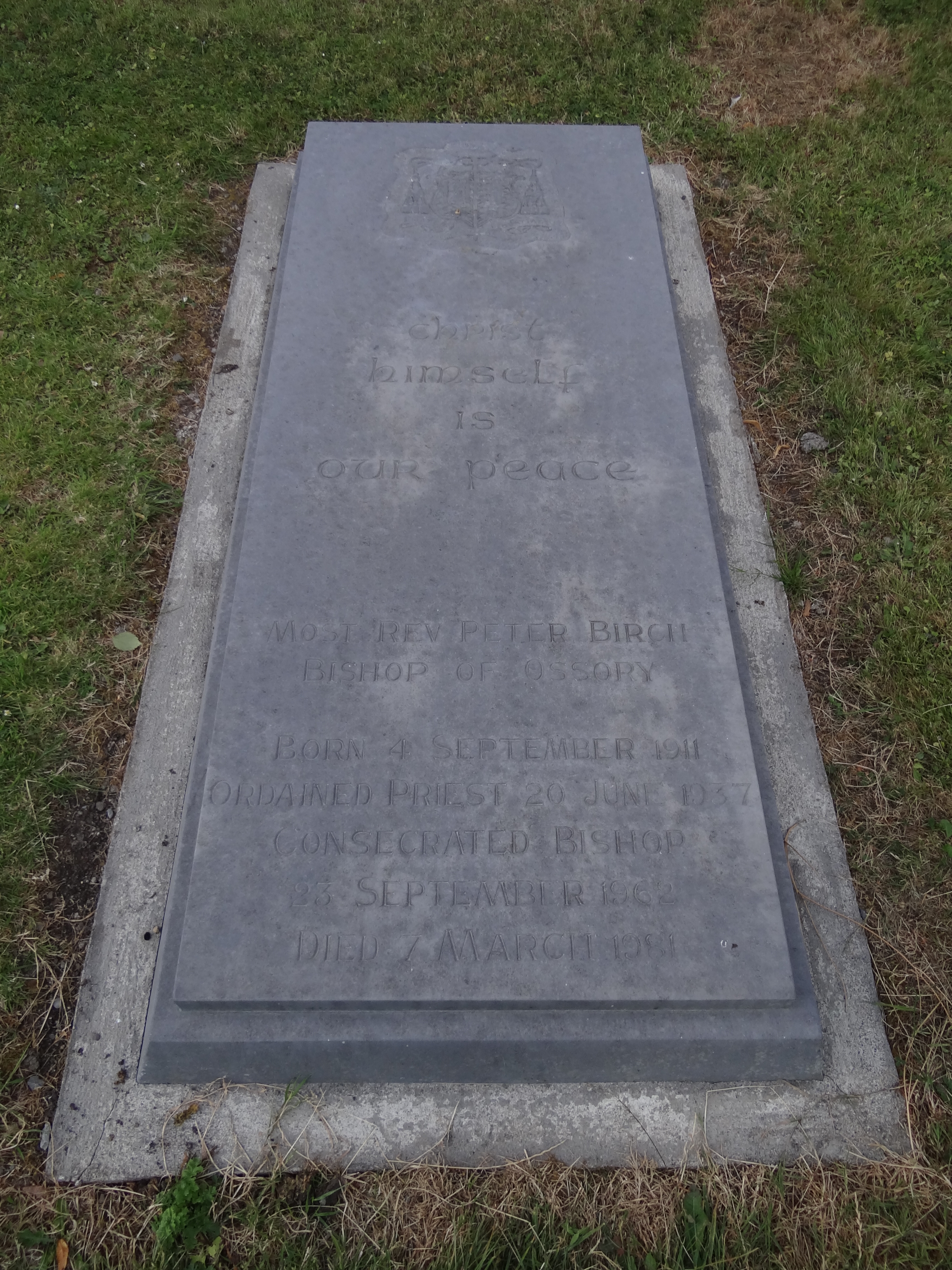
Birch's grave on the grounds of St. Mary's Cathedral, Kilkenny

Birch died on 7 March 1981, aged 69 and is buried in the grounds of St. Mary's Cathedral, Kilkenny. He was succeeded as bishop by Laurence Forristal.

Catholic Church titles
Preceded by Patrick Collier	Bishop of Ossory; 1964–1981	Succeeded by Laurence Forristal
