= Christopher Gaffney (bishop) =

Irish Anglican bishop

Christopher Gaffney, a prebendary of St Patrick's Cathedral, Dublin, was Bishop of Ossory from 1566 until his death on 3 August 1576.

== Notes ==
Church of Ireland titles
Preceded by John Tonory	Bishop of Ossory; 1566–1576	Succeeded by Nicholas Walsh
