= St Mary's Cathedral, Kilkenny =

St Mary’s Cathedral
- Cathedral Church of the Assumption of the Blessed Virgin Mary
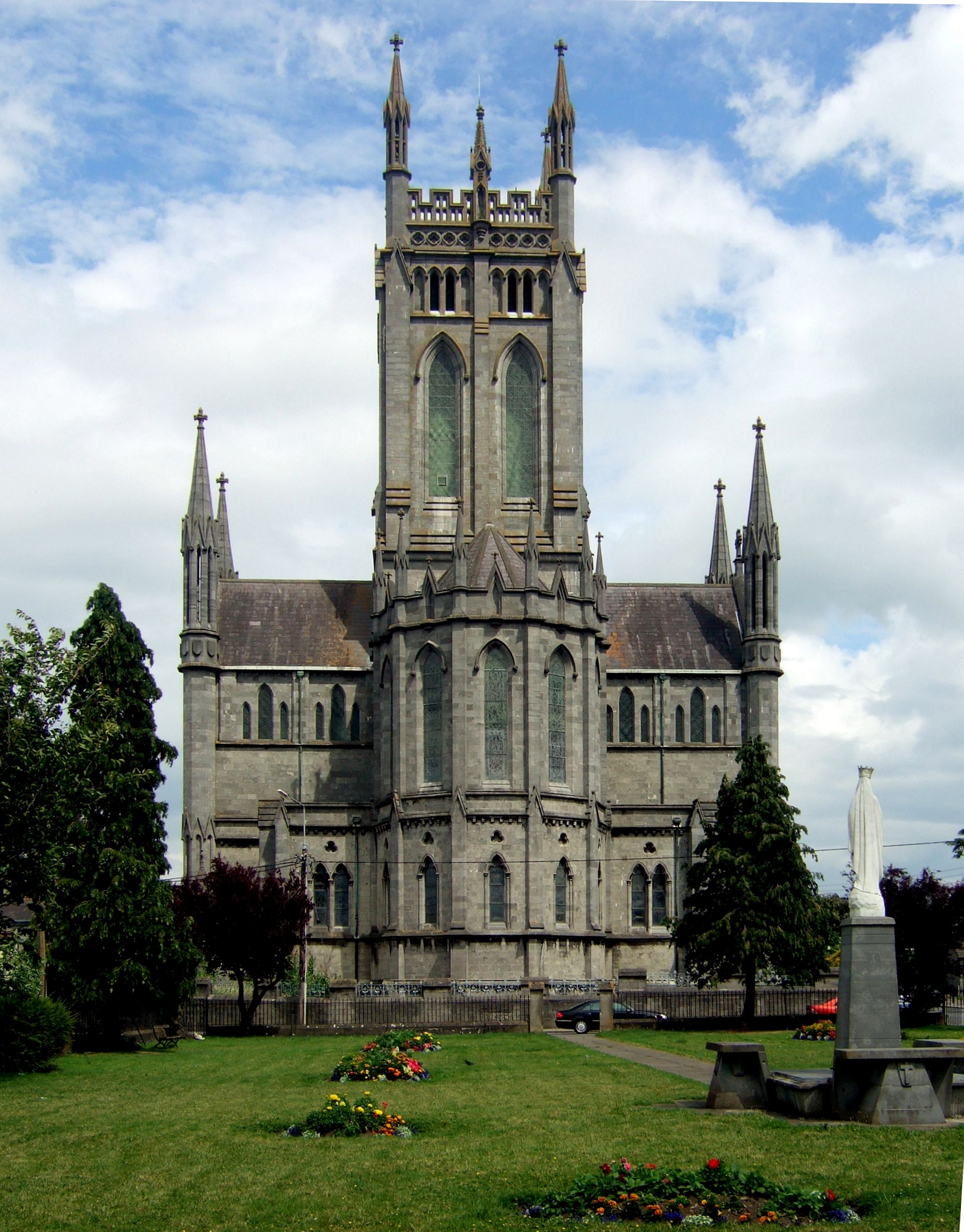
- St Mary’s Cathedral
- 52°39′09″N 07°15′25″W
- Location: County Kilkenny
- Country: Ireland
- Denomination: Roman Catholic

History
- Founded: February 1842
- Consecrated: 4 October 1857

Architecture
- Style: Gothic Revival
- Groundbreaking: April 1843
- Completed: 1857
- Construction cost: £25,000

Administration
- Province: Dublin
- Diocese: Diocese of Ossory

St Mary's Cathedral is the cathedral church of the Roman Catholic Diocese of Ossory. It is situated on James's Street, Kilkenny, Ireland.

Saint Mary's was designed by William Deane Butler (c.1794-1857). He was chosen by Bishop William Kinsella (1793-1845) who instigated the building of St. Mary's in February 1842. Work began in April 1843 and finished in 1857. On Sunday 4 October 1857, St. Mary's had its grand opening, which consisted of a two-and-three-quarter hour ceremony that began at 6.15am. The cost of the building is estimated to have been £25,000.

St. Mary's is made from cut-limestone which was sourced locally. The cathedral has a cruciform plan and its style is described as ‘Early English Gothic’. The design is believed to have been based on Gloucester Cathedral in Gloucester, England. It is situated on the highest point in Kilkenny City and is a significant local landmark.

Its bell in the steeple was made by John Murphy, a Dublin foundry.

St. Mary's has a noted sculpture of the Madonna by Giovanni Maria Benzoni (1809-1873).

== Gallery ==
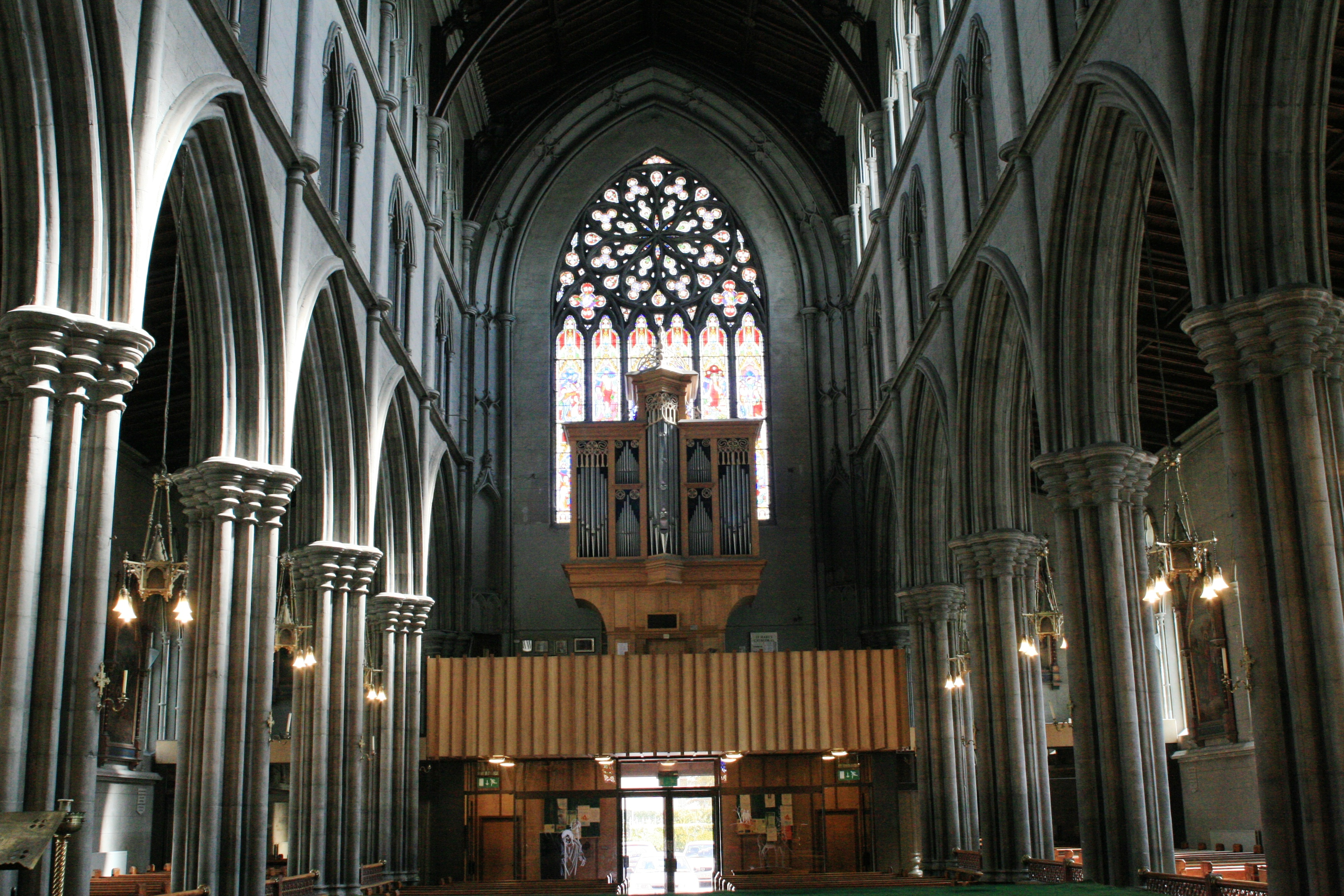
Rear nave

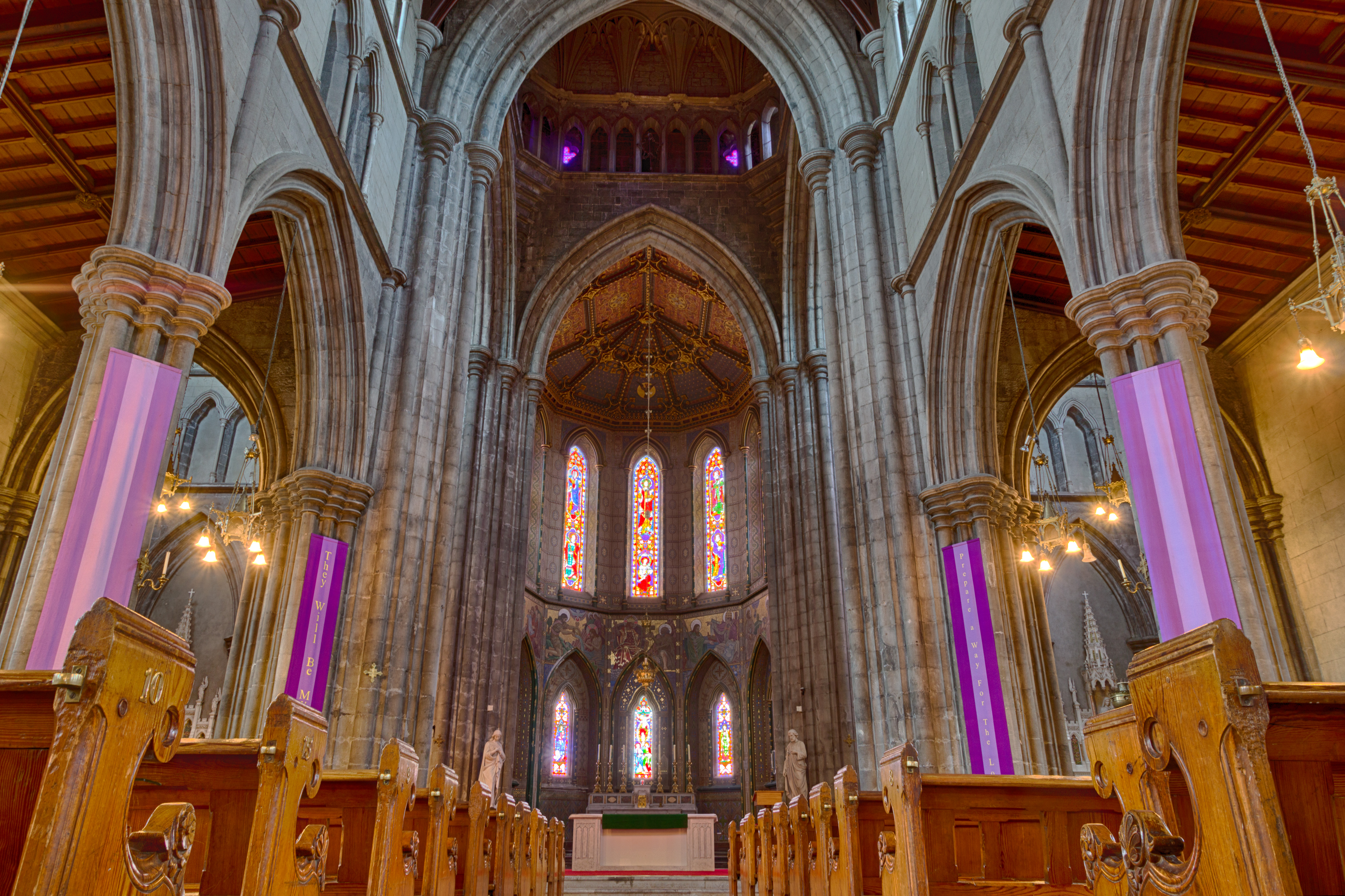
Nave facing the sanctuary

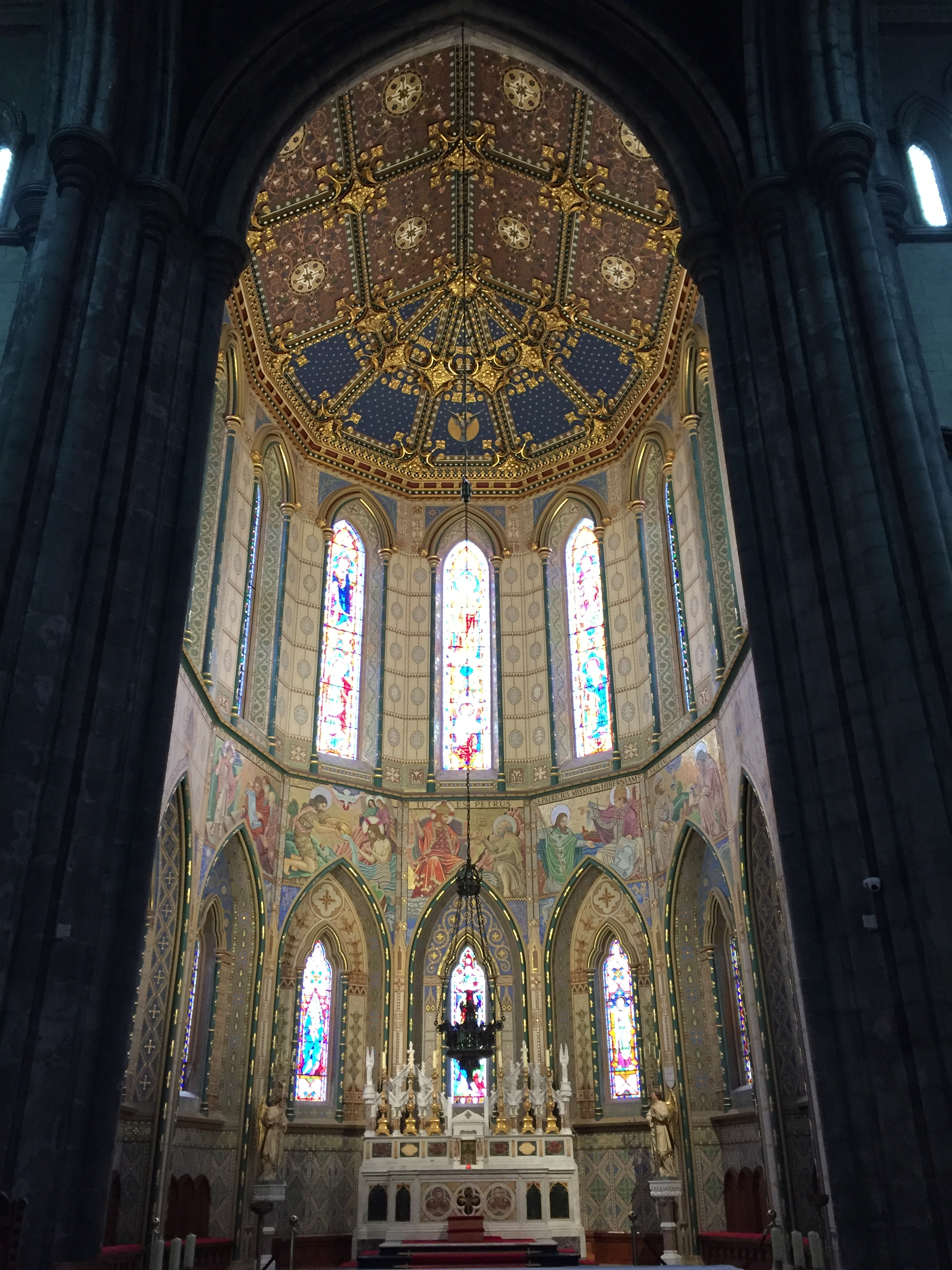
Apse

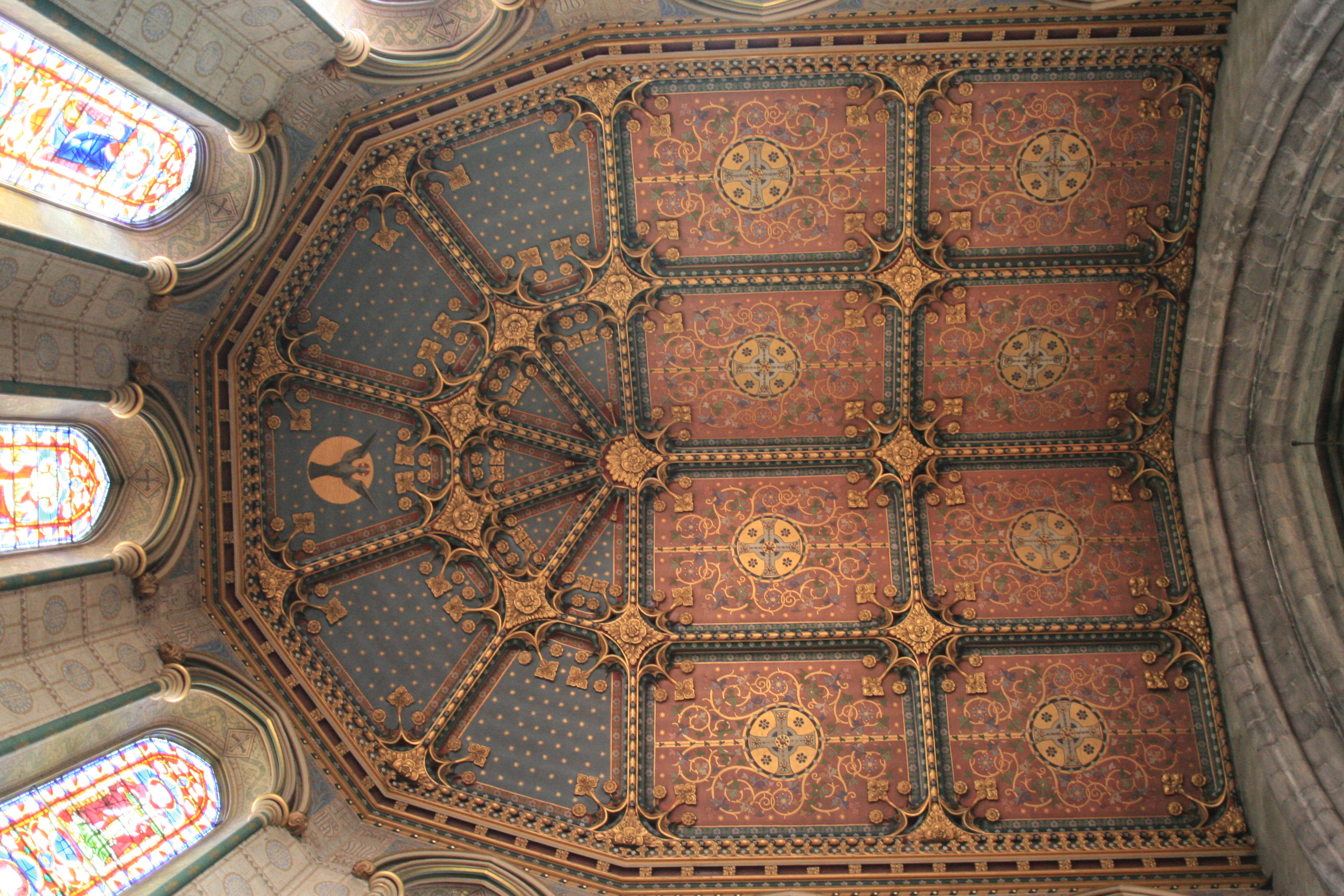
Vault in the apse

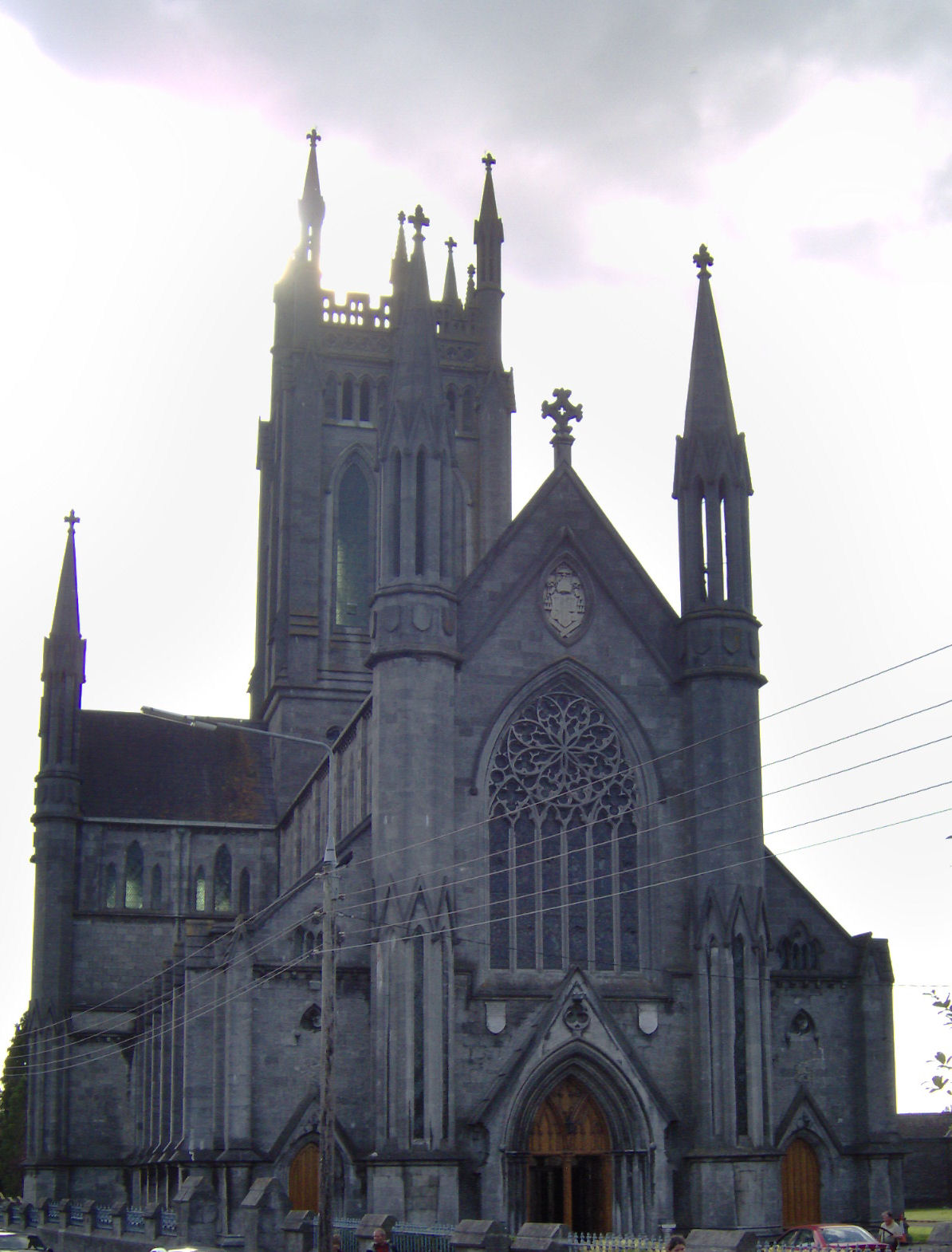
Main façade

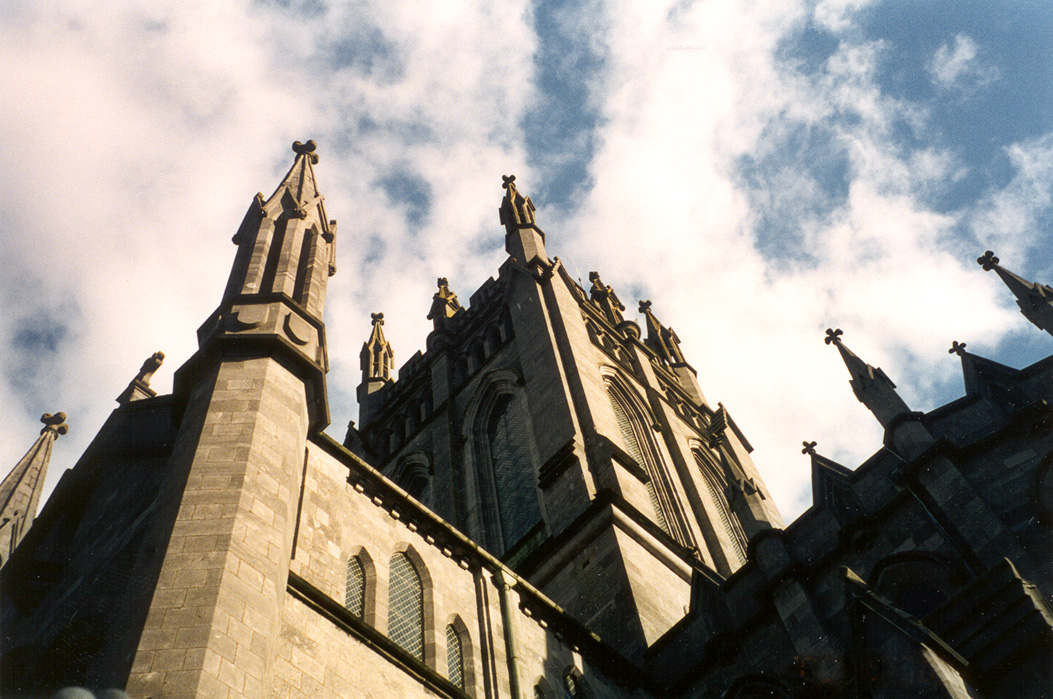
Tower, transept (left) and apse (right)

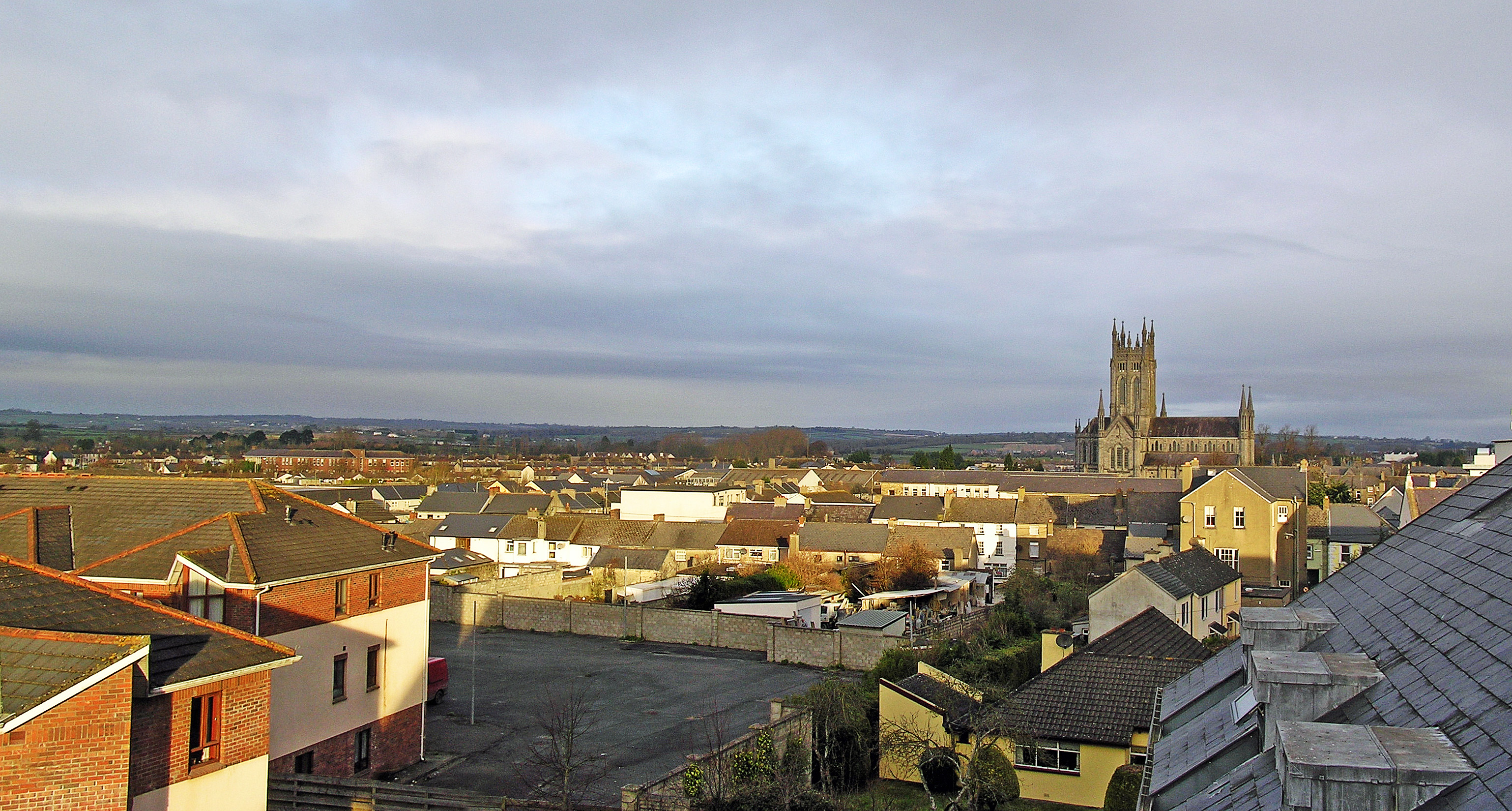
Kilkenny panorama with St Mary's Cathedral at background
