= Ossory (disambiguation) =

The Irish geographical name Ossory can refer to:

- Kingdom of Ossory or Osraige, an ancient kingdom of Ireland
- Baron Upper Ossory, a title held by the Fitzpatrick descendants of the kings of Osraige
- Earl of Upper Ossory, a title held by a cadet branch of the Fitzpatrick clan
- Earl of Ossory, a subsidiary title held by the Earl of Ormond
- Queen's County Ossory, a UK Parliament constituency in Ireland from 1885 to 1918
- Diocese of Ossory, diocese associated with the ancient kingdom above, historical parent of the dioceses below
  - Roman Catholic Diocese of Ossory
    - Bishop of Ossory, bishop of the diocese above
  - Diocese of Ossory, Ferns and Leighlin, Church of Ireland, established 1835
    - Bishop of Ossory, Ferns and Leighlin, bishop of the diocese above
  - Diocese of Cashel and Ossory, Church of Ireland, established 1977
    - Bishop of Cashel and Ossory, bishop of the diocese above
- Ronald Ossory Dunlop (1894–1973), Irish author and painter
- HMS Ossory, three ships of the Royal Navy
- Ossory (horse), thoroughbred racehorse
- Ossory, a fictional prophet in the novel Small Gods
