= Carthage the Elder =

6th-century Irish saint

Saint Carthage the Elder
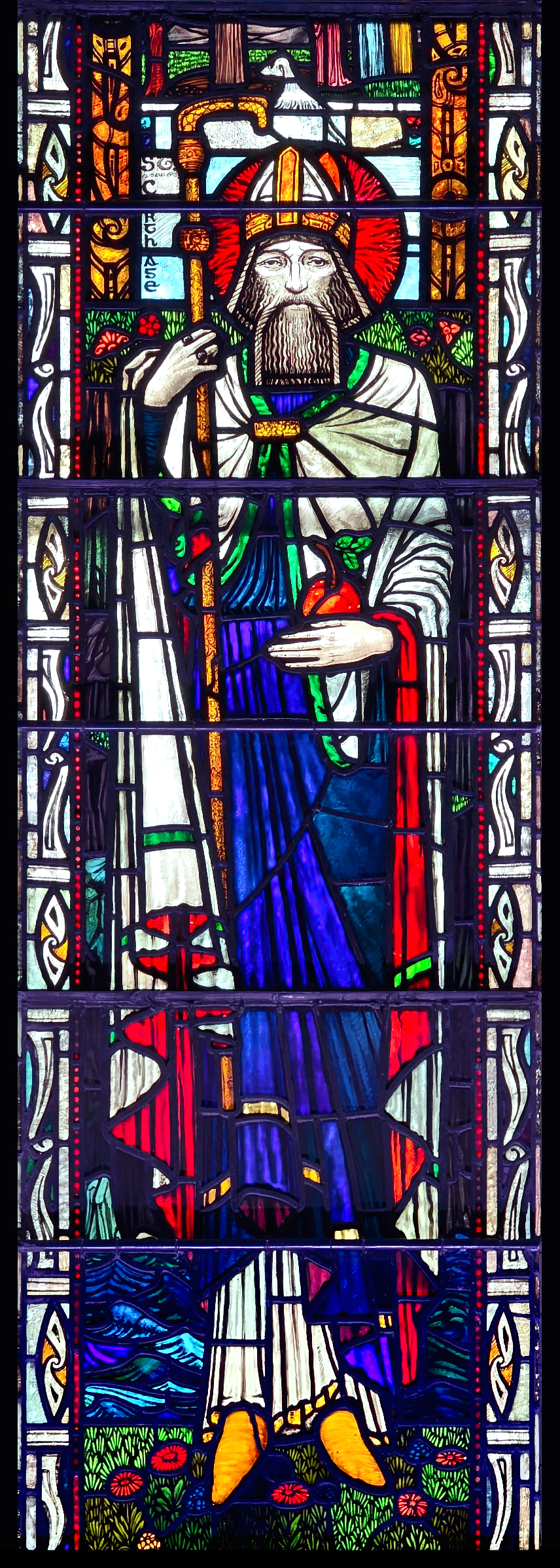
- St. Carthage by Ethel Rhind at the Honan Chapel
- Born: Unknown
- Died: 6th century
- Feast: 5 March

Saint Carthage the Elder (or Carthach) was an Irish bishop and abbot in the sixth century. His feast day is 5 March.

The saint is mainly known as a disciple and successor of Ciaran of Saighir (the Elder) and the tutor and fosterer of his greater namesake, Saint Carthage of Lismore (also known as Saint Mochuda).

Carthage was of the Eóganacht Chaisil and son, or, more probably, grandson of Óengus mac Nad Froích whom Saint Patrick baptized. He was sent by St. Ciaran upon a penitential pilgrimage, when he spent seven years abroad, visiting Gaul and Rome. On completion of his canonical penance, Carthage was reinstated as a member of the religious brotherhood of Saighir. Afterwards he founded the monastery of Druim Fertain in Carberry and another monastery in the upper island of Lough Sheelin, County Meath.

In the barony of Clanmaurice is a townland called Monument on which are some scant remains of an ancient church called Cill Cartaig (Carthage's Church).

There is a short paragraph about St. Cartha in The Martyrology of Donegal: a Calendar of the Saints of Ireland (1864) by James Michael O'Clery, page 65:

Carthach, Bishop, alumnus of Ciaran of Saighir. One of his places was Druim-fertain, and in Cairbre Ua Ciardha is Druim-fertain; and to him belongs Inish Uachtair in Loch Sileann, and Cill Charthaigh in Tir Boghaine in Cinel Conaill. He was son of Aenghus, son of Nadfraech king of Munster, &c.

Cill Charthaigh is Kilcar.

== See also ==
- Ciarán of Saigir
- Saighir
- Roman Catholic Diocese of Ossory
- Osraige
- Óengus mac Nad Froích
