= Saighir =

Ruined monastic site in Offaly, Ireland

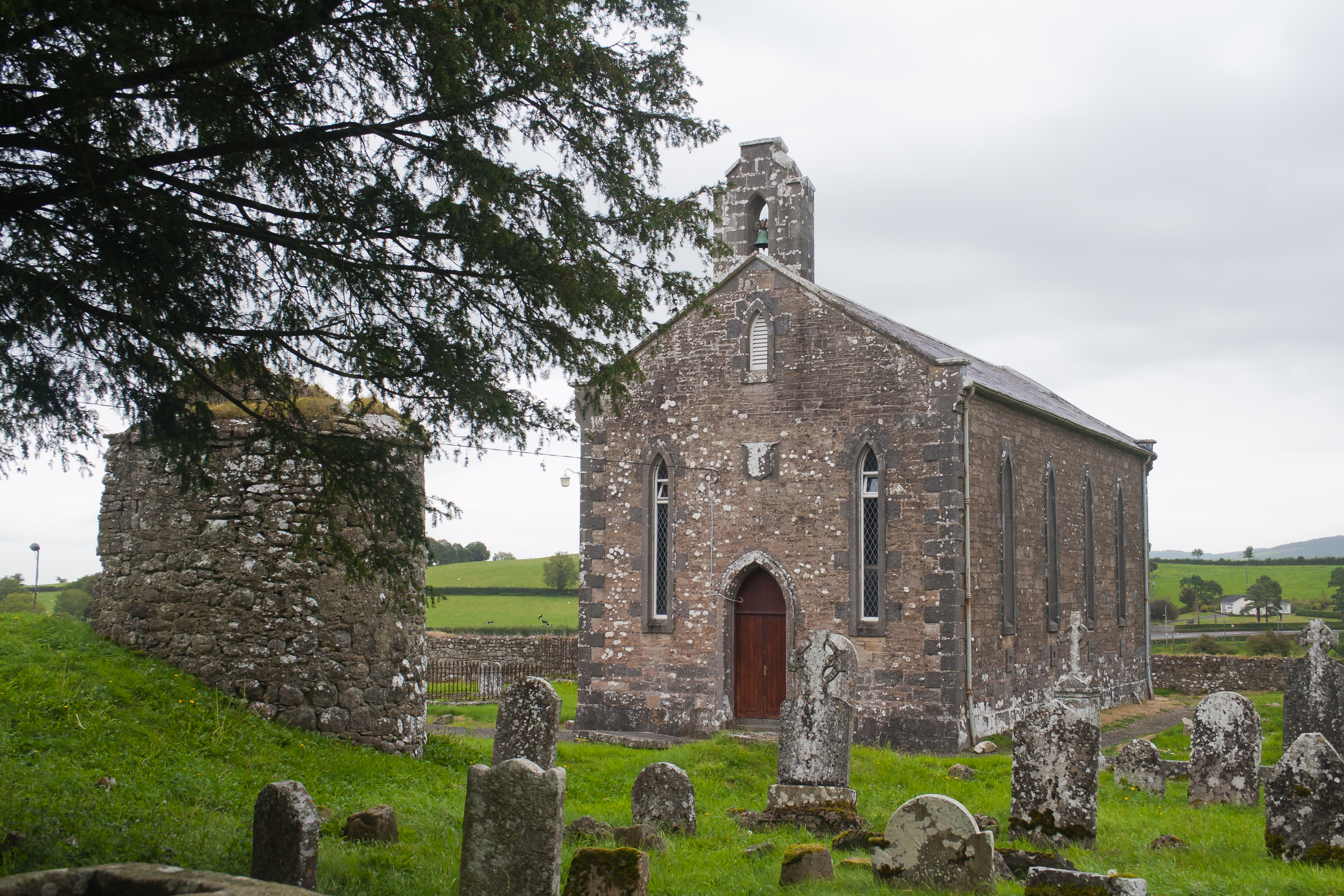
- Present parish church at Saighir

- Location within Ireland
- Interactive map of Saighir

Monastery information
- Full name: Saighir Chiaráin
- Other name: Seir Kieran

Site
- Coordinates: 53°04′23″N 7°47′44″W

Saighir (Seir Kieran; also named Seirkieran, in Irish Saighir Chiaráin), is a monastic site in Clareen, County Offaly, founded by Ciarán of Saigir sometime before the year 489.

== History ==
According to his hagiographers, Ciarán was born in pagan Ireland and left for Rome to receive Christian baptism and study the Bible. In Rome for twenty or thirty years, he was ordained a bishop and returned to Ireland. On the way, he is said to have met Saint Patrick in Italy and from him received a clapperless bell; whence Patrick told Ciarán to found a church when the bell should miraculously sound, and nearby would be a cold spring. Upon returning to Ireland, he evangelized his paternal kinsmen, the Osraige, and passed through their territory and over the Slieve Bloom Mountains when he heard the tongueless bell sound, and nearby was a spring of cold water.

The church grew in importance and as one of Ireland's oldest Christian sites. As the main monastery in Osraige it was the burial ground for the Kings of Osraige of the Dál Birn. Several times it was sacked by the Vikings, and later it diminished in importance and was superseded by Aghaboe Abbey c.1052. It was refounded as a priory of the Augustinian Canons c.1170, and dissolved in 1568.

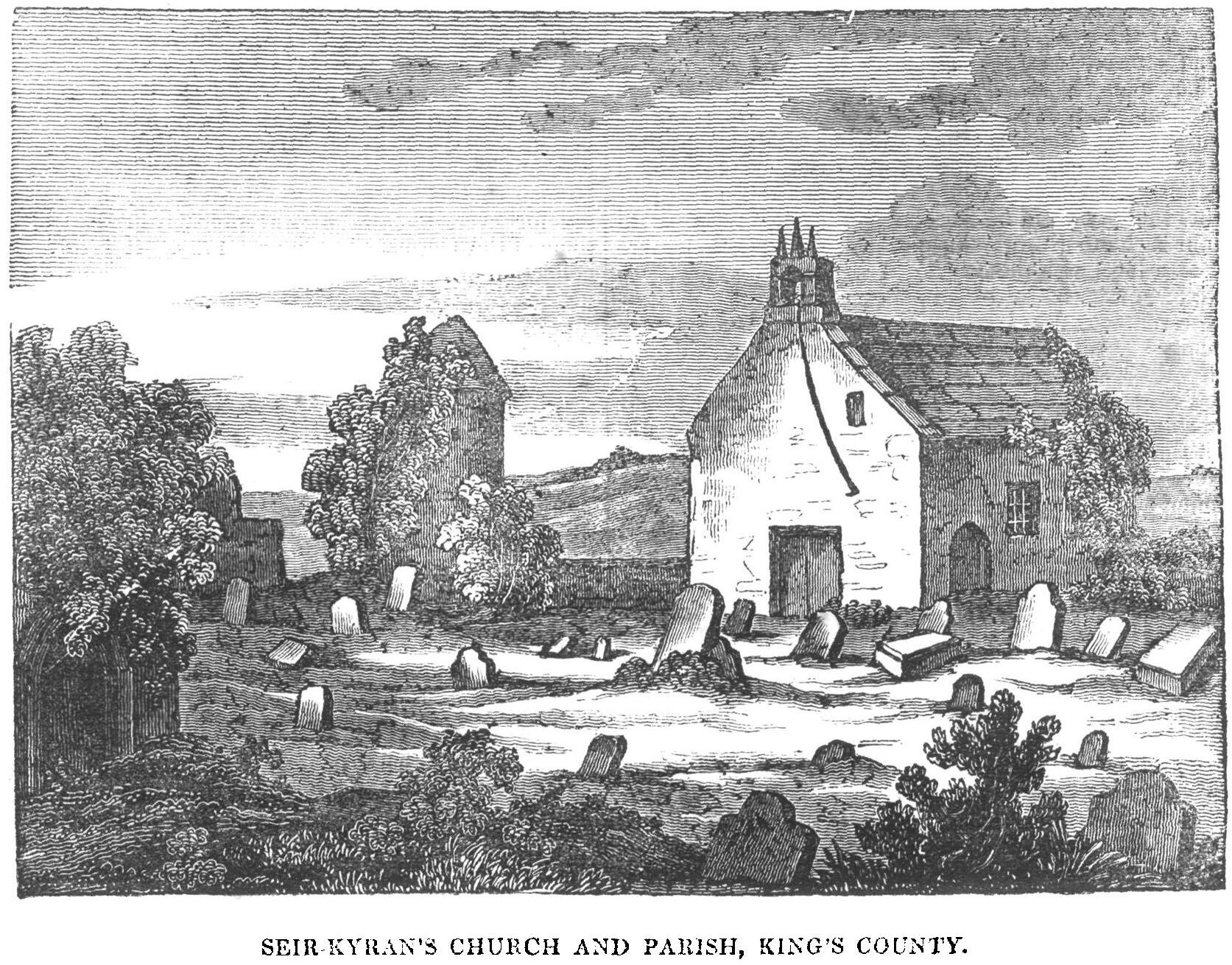
Seir-Kyran's Church and Parish, King's County, Dublin Penny Journal 1834

Not much survives of Saighir today. The remaining ruins include the base of a round tower, the base of a 9th-century high cross, some foundations of the priory, remainings of fortifications, a motte of the Anglo-Norman lords, and a small 19th-century church which was erected close to the site of the former church of the priory. Attached to the site are a holy whitethorn bush on which clothes are hung on 5 March in honour of St. Ciarán, and his holy well (see Clootie well).

== Saighir in the Annals ==
- 695 St Killen MacLubnen was abbot of Saighir
- 744 Laidhgnen Abbot of Saighir was slain
- 771 Tnuthghal the Abbot died
- 783 (recte 788) Maccog the Abbot died
- 788 (recte 793) Cucathrach of Saighir died
- 807 (recte 812) Cobhthach the Abbot died
- 809 (recte 814) Fearadhach the Abbot died
- 810 (recte 815) Conchobar the Abbot died
- 826 Connmhach Ua Loichene the Abbot died
- 832 Irghalach the Abbot died
- 842 Plundering of Birr and Saighir by the Gentiles
- 846 Anluan the Abbot died
- 867 Cormac son of Eladhach Abbot of Saighir bishop and scribe died
- 870 Geran son of Dicosc the Abbot died
- 885 Sloghadhach Ua Raithnen the Abbot died
- 912 Cormac Bishop of Saighir died
- 919 Fearghal son of Maelmordha the Abbot died
- 920 Aedh Ua Raithnen old sage of Ireland and wise man of Saighir died
- 937 Ceallach son of Caellaighe Prior of Saighir died
- 941 Fogartach the Abbot died
- 941-4 At this time Sadhbh Queen of Ireland wife of the Ard Righ Donn chadh son of Flann Sionna and daughter of Donnchadh King of Ossory grieved that Saighir the burial place of her ancestors lay open and defenceless while so many other famous churches in Ireland were encircled by walls induced her royal husband to send a number of masons to erect a suitable wall of stone around the cemetery
- 951 Ceannfaeladh son of Suibhne Abbot of Saighir died
- 952 Saighir Chiarain was plundered by the men of Munster
- 961 Fearghal son of Ceallach died at Saighir after penance
- 974 or 975 Donnchadh King of Ossory father of Queen Sadhbh or Sabia above died at an advanced age and was buried with his forefathers at Saighir
- 984 Flaithlemh airchinneach of Saighir died
- 1004 Foghartach Abbot of Leithghlinn and Saighir died
- 1012 The Prior of Saighir was killed
- 1048 Dunchadh Ua Ceileachair successor of Ciarán of Saighir died
- 1079 Ceallach Reamhar the Fat successor of Brenainn of Birr and of Ciarán of Saighir died
- 1118 The See of Ossory was changed from Seir Kieran to Aghaboe (most probably by the Synod of Rathbreasail held in this year)
- 1200 About this date the old Irish order of monks at Saighir having become extinct or been superseded the monastery church and parish were handed over to the Canons Regular of the Order of St Augustine who established a community here and continued in possession down to the Reformation
- 1284 The Lord Bishop of Ossory Geoffry St Leger acquired (recte recovered) the manor of Serrkeran by duel according to Clynn and others

== Keating's story about Saighir's wall ==
Geoffrey Keating related a story of the building of a wall around the royal graveyard of Saighir in his work Foras Feasa ar Éirinn:

"Donnchadh, son of Flann Sionna, son of Maoilseachlainn, son of Maolruanuidh, son of Donnchadh, son of Domhnall, son of Murchadh, son of Diarmaid, son of Airmeadhach Caoch, son of Conall Guithbhinn, son of Suibhne Meann of the race of Eireamhon, held the sovereignty of Ireland twenty years. Gormfhlaith, daughter of Flann, son of Conaing, was the mother of this Donnchadh, and his wife was Sadhbh, daughter of Donnchadh, son of Ceallach, king of Osruighe. And according to the book of Ard Macha this Donnchadh, son of Flann, king of Ireland, went with a large party to build a wall or fence round Saighir Chiarain by the direction of his wife, namely, Sadhbh, daughter of Donnchadh, son of Ceallach; for she felt envious at there being a wall or fence round every principal church in Ireland, while her own church, that is Saighir, was without a wall; for the burying place of the kings of Osruighe was at Saighir Chiarain at that time. Accordingly, the men of Meath came to Donnchadh's mound beside Saighir to the west, and they set themselves to build the fence round the church day by day; and at this time the body of Donnchadh, son of Ceallach, king of Osruighe, was brought to Saighir to be buried; and after it was buried, when the darkness of night had set in, nine hairy jet-black crosans came upon the grave and set to choir-chanting as crosans are wont to do ever since, and their eyes and their teeth were whiter than snow, and all their other limbs blacker than blacksmith's coal.

They had come, it seems, bringing with them a lay for the king of Osruighe. And all who saw them grew sick a day and a night at the sight. Here is the lay:

The people of Donnchadha Mor son of Ceallach, A proud quarterage, Melodious bands who are calling out Are we when on a hosting: Hosts hunting, full plains, Houses for drinking, Fair young women, hospitable princes, Great nobles; The shout of his companies and his troops, The quarterage of a good host; Ranks of skirmishers in the summer sun, Drinking cups, feast-shouts; Harps and pipes in harmony. Filés of Faibhle With a fair new poem they used to come To the gracious king of Raighne; Dod dor dod dan, O son of the king of Raighne, With prosperity, Where are the goblets where the friendship That thy father had? May a pang seized us for the man Whom all amused, Excellent the course on which he was In the fair world; Baptais baptain on his soul Since it is heard, Great his reward after going to the other world, We are his people.

Now this band used to keep chanting this lay from nightfall till morning every night over the grave of Donnchadh, so that a doubt arose in the minds of clergy and laity, for they were surprised that demons should be openly attending the body of that most virtuous king. Indeed, among the pious practices of the king were frequent confession and the receiving of the Body of Christ and fervent prayers; and among his exercises of holy zeal was to send food and provisions to be given to God's poor in each principal church in Osruighe on each of the apostles' feasts. Moreover, he used to place an orphan or a poor man to be maintained for God's sake in every household throughout Osruighe, and had besides three purses or three leather bags, to wit, a bag in which each person of the household put a tithe of the food he ate, and a bag in which each put his Michael's portion, and a third bag in which a portion of beeswax was put, which was at the disposal of the housewife to dispense to the poor who had got no share of the tithes or of the Michael's portion. As to the clerics, they fasted and prayed for three days that it might be made known to them why the demons attended the king's body; and an angel of God appeared in a vision to a servant of God of the race of Fiachaidh son of Niall, who was in that assembly. ‘Ye have done well in keeping that fast,’ said the angel, ‘now these are nine of the company of Ui Coingheoidh, and this is the third time they have come to Ireland from hell; and since they could not find an occasion against this king during his life, they are causing a disturbance over his body after his death; and do ye have Mass said and water blessed to-morrow,’ continued the angel, ‘and let it be sprinkled on the grave and throughout all the churchyard, and all the demons will go away.’

This was done and the company of Ui Coingheoidh appeared in the air above, in the form of jet black birds, and they did not venture to light on the churchyard ground because of its having been blessed; and they said that the fasting and the bleesing of the grave by the clergy were necessary, ‘for we would be after his body on earth since we have not power over his soul in heaven’. And thereupon they went out of sight of all and they did not see them ever since. It was about this time that the crosan Fionn O Cionga and Mac Rionntach O Connorain lived, and it was they who learned by rote the above-mentioned lay from the company of Ui Coinghaoidh while they were chanting it above the grave of Donnchadh, son of Ceallach, king of Osruighe, and the two referred to practised crosantacht as an art until death."

== See also ==
- Carthage the Elder
- Seir Kieran GAA
