= Ros Tapestry Project =

Community arts and history project in New Ross, County Wexford, Ireland

The Ros Tapestry Project is a major community arts and history project centered on the town of New Ross in County Wexford, Ireland. The project is dedicated to producing a tapestry in fifteen panels which tells the story of the coming of the Normans to Ireland in the 12th century and the foundation of the port and town of New Ross at the beginning of the 13th century. Each tapestry panel is approximately four and a half feet deep (1.5m) by six feet (1.8m) wide and tells of a unique aspect of the epic story. Six panels were finished for an Exhibition in 2007 and a further nine panels are now (2020) completed.

== History of the project ==
=== Beginning ===
The project began in May 1998 with an idea to make a tapestry telling the story of the coming of the Normans to Ireland in tapestry form and to hang this tapestry in the historic St. Mary's Church of Ireland Church in New Ross. The idea originated with the Rector of the Church, Reverend Paul Mooney, who then consulted with Alexis Bernstorff, an art historian and professional in the field of tapestry and fabric restoration. Over the summer of 1998, Dr. Mooney and Alexis Bernstorff consulted with local artist Ms. Reiltin Murphy to create a visualisation of how the tapestry could be best displayed in the Church of Ireland parish church. At that time the focus of the tapestry widened from the story of the Norman expansion into Ireland in the latter part of the 12th century to include the founding of the port and town of New Ross at the beginning of the 13th century. A provisional list of fifteen themes for tapestry panels was outlined, as well as the measurements for the panels to be hung from the gallery of the late Georgian, early 19th-century church. Countess Ann Griffin Bernstorff, professional artist and mother of Alexis Bernstorff, was approached to consider designing the tapestry and offered to paint the cartoons for the fifteen panels. Countess Bernstorff began with some experimental pieces in the autumn of 1998 and a draft plan for the project was produced and circulated at that time.

=== Planning ===
In the spring of 1999, a small committee of people began to plan for the project in earnest, and New Ross lawyer Simon Kennedy freely gave of his time and services to draft articles of association for the project and to register the project as a company limited by guarantee without shares. This not-for-profit legal status helped pave the way for applications for grants and for the successful application for status for the project.

=== Painting ===
Meanwhile, following extensive historical research Countess Bernstorff painted the cartoon for the first tapestry panel which depicted the Hook Lighthouse in the Medieval era. This lighthouse is the oldest continually serving working lighthouse in Europe and was founded by monks in the early Middle Ages as Christianity came into southeast Ireland. This panel was given to a group of volunteer stitchers in Fethard-on-Sea in early 2000, as there is a policy to locate the creation each panel close to the historical location, and this panel was completed over the next three years. Alexis Bernstorff supervised the training of stitchers and the coordination of the production of the tapestry panel and served in this capacity on all tapestry panels.

=== Stitching ===
From 2000 to 2012, twelve panels were produced by the extraordinary commitment, skill and 'espirit de corp' of the voluntary stitchers. These panels are:

- Evening – The Lighthouse at Hook Head produced in Fethard-on-Sea
- Hunt in the Forest of Ros depicting William Marshal and Isabel de Clare hunting in the Forest around New Ross, produced by the Davidstown-Clonroche group
- Gothic Glory – The building of the Parish Church of St. Mary’s in 1210 depicting the building of the original 13th-century St. Mary's Church in New Ross produced by the Bawnmore-New Ross group
- The Thriving Port of Ros depicting Italian bankers at the Quay in 13th-century New Ross port, also produced by the Davidstown-Clonroche group
- The Abduction of Dervorgilla, stitched near Ferns, Co Wexford
- The Siege of Wexford, at Wexford town
- Arrogant Trespass – The Normans Landing at Bannow Strand, Duncannon Fort
- William Marshal – The Flower of Chivalry at Crossabeg, Wexford
- The Marriage of Isabel de Clare and William Marshal at Bunclody
- Ex Voto Tintern Abbey – William Marshal’s Stormy Crossing to Ireland, at Poulfur, Fethard-on-sea
- The Sheaf of Corn – The Distaff Descent at Bawnmore, New Ross.

Over the last fourteen years 150 voluntary stitchers stitching on panels at various locations in County Wexford and at one location in County Kilkenny in Ireland. In many cases people have agreed to let a room of their house be used for up to four or more years as a location for the stitching of panels.

As of 2020, three additional panels have been completed. These are:

- The Celts – An Island Fastness
- The Walling of Ros – Sixteen Guilds Protect Their Town
- Battles in the Kingdom of Ossory, depicting the Battle of Ossory in County Kilkenny worked in Kilkenny at Rothe House

== See also ==
- Prestonpans Tapestry
- Embroidery
