= Sweet Freedom =

Sweet freedom may refer to:

== Music ==
=== Albums ===
- Sweet Freedom (Uriah Heep album), 1973 album
- Sweet Freedom (Michael McDonald album), 1986 compilation album
- Sweet Freedom - Now What?, 1994 album by Joe McPhee
- Sweet Freedom, 1994 album by Octave

=== Songs ===
- "Sweet Freedom" (song), 1986 song by Michael McDonald
- "Sweet Freedom", 1968 single by The Outer Limits, also recorded by Christie
- "Sweet Freedom", 1998 single by Shawn Christopher

== Other uses ==
- Sweet Freedom: A Devotional, a 2015 book by Sarah Palin
