= HMS Ossory =

Three ships of the Royal Navy have borne the name HMS Ossory, after the Kingdom of Ossory, in Ireland, or possibly Thomas Butler, Earl of Ossory:

- HMS Ossory (1682) was a 90-gun second-rate ship of the line launched in 1682. She was renamed HMS Prince in 1705, HMS Princess in 1716 and HMS Princess Royal in 1728. She was broken up in 1773.
- HMS Ossory (1915) was an Admiralty M-class destroyer, launched in 1916 and sold for scrap in 1921.
- HMS Ossory (J463) was an Algerine-class minesweeper launched in 1944 and broken up in 1959.

In addition: Ossory was a ship that Lieutenant John Tyrrell (RN) commanded for a voyage from Bengal to London in 1792–1794, and whose log book is in the India Office Library. No other data seems to exist for this vessel.
