= Diocese of Ossory =

Diocese of Ossory may refer to:

- Roman Catholic Diocese of Ossory
- The former Church of Ireland diocese of Ossory is now incorporated within the united Diocese of Cashel and Ossory
