= Dúngal mac Fergaile =

King of Osraige
- Reign: 802–842
- Predecessor: Fergal mac Anmchada
- Successor: Cerball mac Dúnlainge
- Died: 842
- Issue: Cerball mac Dúnlainge; Riacan mac Dúnlainge; Land ingen Dúngaile
- House: Dál Birn
- Father: Fergal mac Anmchada

Dúngal mac Fergaile (sometime Dúnlang mac Fergaile) was king of Osraige from 802 until his death in 842.

== History ==
Dúngal mac Fergaile was of the old Ossorian lineage called the Dál Birn, who traced their descent from Óengus Osrithe the first king of Osraige through his son and successor Loegaire Birn Buadach, of the second century. King Dúngal took the throne of Osraige after the death of his father, king Fergal mac Anmchada (K.O., d. 802) at a critical point in its history, just at the dawn of the Viking age in Ireland. Dúngal mac Fergaile's long reign was part of a longer period of steady royal succession and political stability within the kingdom of Osraige. He is also noteworthy as being the father of two other kings of Osraige; Cerball mac Dúnlainge (K.O. 842-888), his successor whose fame is recounted in the Fragmentary Annals of Ireland and Riacan mac Dúnlainge (K.O. 888-894); as well as their sister, princess Land ingen Dúngaile, wife of the high king Máel Sechnaill mac Máele Ruanaid.
