= Domnall Mór Ua Briain =

King of Thomond from 1168 to 1194

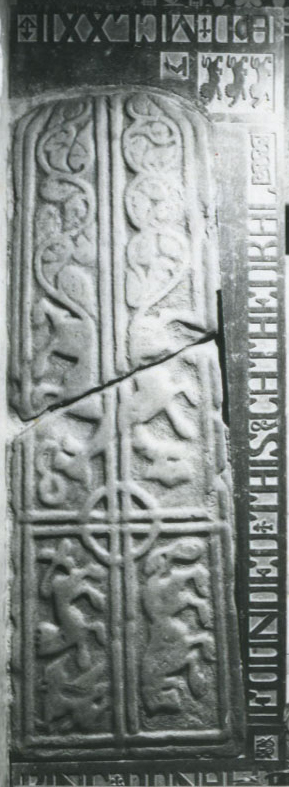
- Tomb in St Mary's Cathedral, Limerick

King of Thomond
- Reign: 1168-1194
- Coronation: 1168
- Predecessor: Muirchertach mac Toirdelbhach Ua Briain
- Successor: Muirchertach Dall macDomnaill Mór

King of Munster
- Reign: 1168-1194
- Coronation: 1168
- Predecessor: Muirchertach mac Toirdelbhach Ua Briain

King of Limerick
- Reign: 1168-1194
- Coronation: 1168
- Predecessor: Muirchertach mac Toirdelbhach Ua Briain
- Died: 1194
- Burial: The Cathedral of Saint Mary Blessed Virgin, Limerick
- Spouse: Orlacan Ní Murchada
- Issue: Muirchertach Dall macDomnaill Mór Ó Briain, Conchobar Ruad macDomhnaill Ó Briain, Donnchadh Cairbreach Ó Briain, Princess (Ní Briain) de Burgh
- House: House of Ua Briain
- Father: Toirdhealbhach mac Diarmada Ua Briain
- Mother: Sadb MacGillapatrick

Domnall Mór Ua Briain, or Domnall Mór mac Toirrdelbaig Uí Briain, was King of Thomond in Ireland from 1168 to 1194 and a claimant to the title King of Munster. He was also styled King of Limerick, a title belonging to the O'Brien dynasty since Brian Boru's sacking of the Hiberno-Norse city state after the Battle of Sulcoit in the 10th century.

== History ==
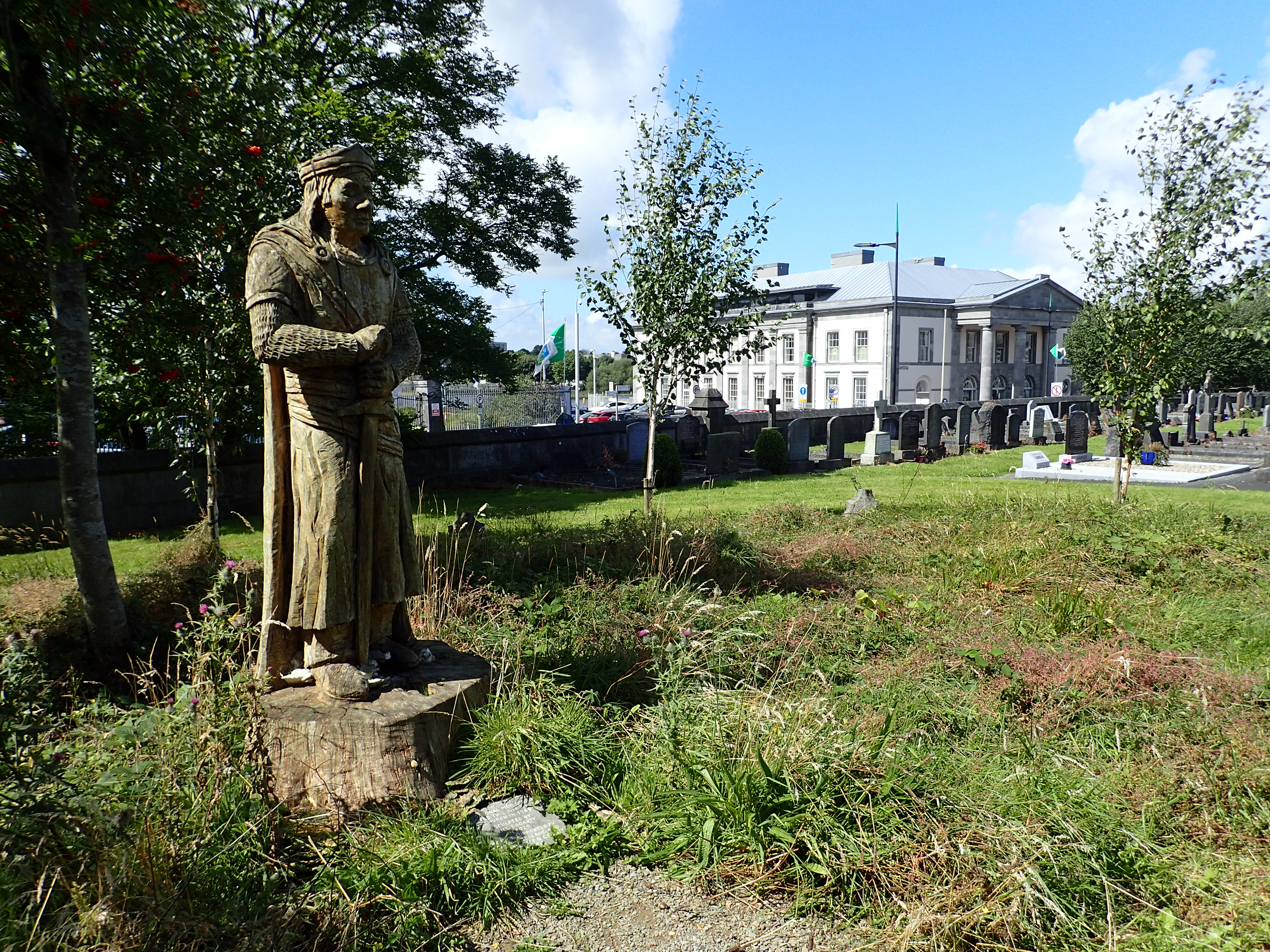
Statue of Domnall in the grounds of St Mary's Cathedral

Domnall Mór ("Donall the Great") was the third son of Toirdhealbhach mac Diarmada Ua Briain, King of Munster, who reigned from 1142 to 1167. He ascended to the throne in 1168 after the death of his eldest brother, Muirchertach, who had succeeded their father as king. Muirchertach was killed at the instigation of his cousin Conchobar mac Muirchertach Ua Briain. His other brother Brian of Slieve Bloom was blinded in 1169. The same year, Domnall entered into conflict with the High King of Ireland, Ruaidrí Ua Conchobair and was forced to pay him a tribute of 300 cows.

In 1171, he submitted to King Henry II of England at Cashel, but he continued to fight successfully against the Norman incursion into southwest Ireland for many years. In 1175, having demolished the Cambro-Normans at the Battle of Thurles, he consolidated his power by blinding two of his cousins, Dermot mac Taig Ua Briain and Mathgamain mac Toirdhelbeach Ua Briain, in Limerick. He was, however, driven from Thomond by Ua Conchobair, the High King, the same year. In 1176, he drove the Normans from Limerick and in 1178 finally drove out the Uí Fidgenti (AI), the ancient rulers of the modern County Limerick region.

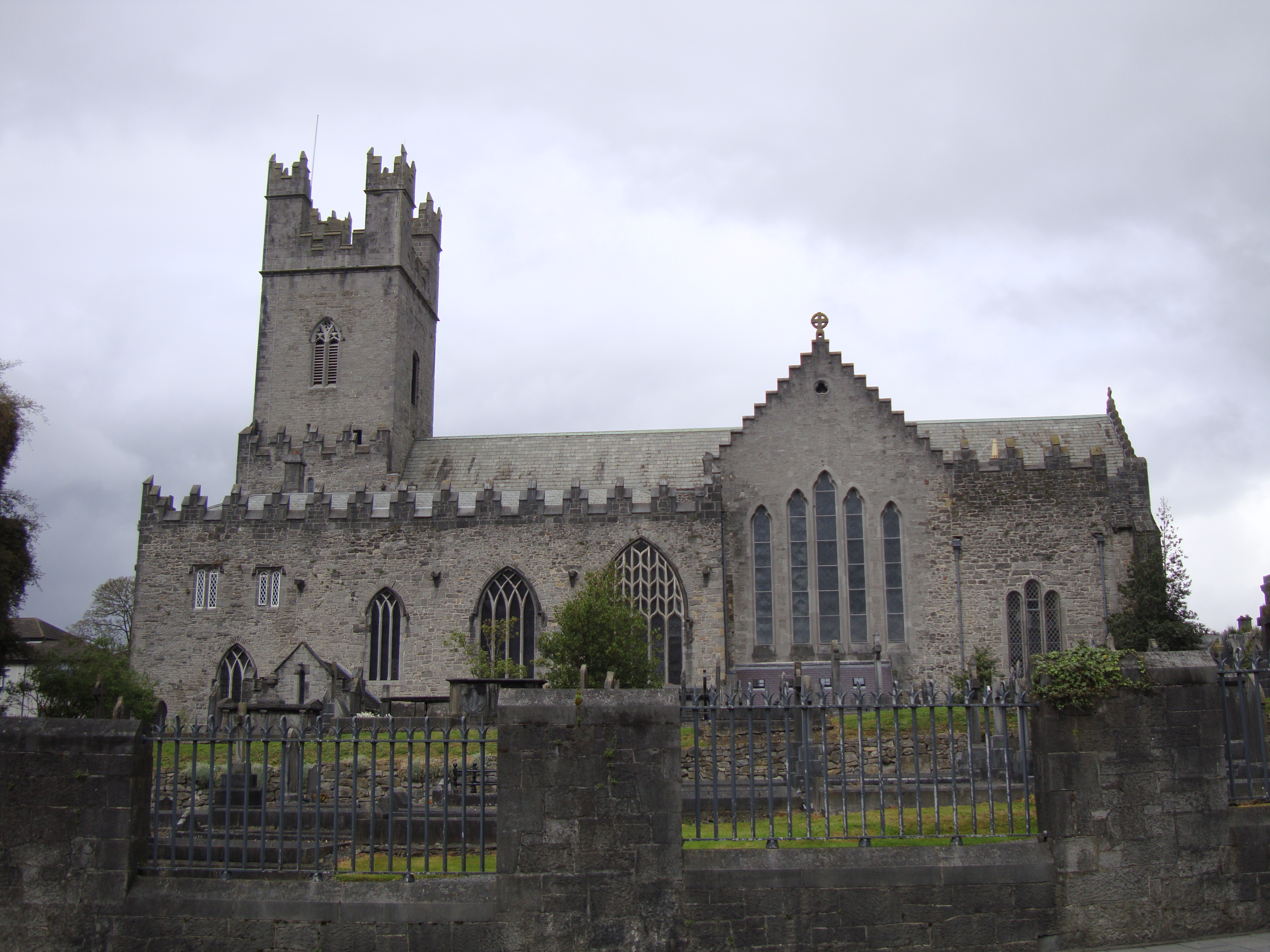
The Cathedral of Saint Mary Blessed Virgin, Limerick, founded by Donall O'Brien and also where he is buried.

In 1184, part of his lands was enfeoffed to Philip de Braose, Lord Deputy of Ireland. Supported by Robert Fitz-Stephen and Miles de Cogan, the Lord Deputy set out to take possession of Limerick, but on approaching the city, turned back in a panic. In 1185 when Prince John of England intervened in Ireland, Domnall Mór demolished the Normans again when John was plundering along the valley of the River Suir. The same year he also blinded the last Dermot brother. In 1188, he helped the men of Connacht under Conchobar Maenmaige Ua Conchobhair to overcome Jean de Courcy in the Curlew Mountains. In 1193, the Normans devastated Clare in reprisal and plundered Domnall's possessions in Ossory.

He established Holy Cross Abbey in 1180 and Kilcooly Abbey in 1184, both under the Cistercian order.

According to the Annals of Ulster, he was the last king of Munster, dying in 1194. It is believed that he is buried within Saint Mary's Cathedral, Limerick, a church he first organised. An ancient stone coffin lid, purportedly that of King Domnall, lies in the Chancel near the high altar.

== Family ==
Domnall Mór married Orlacan, daughter of Diarmait Mac Murchada and Sadb Ní Faeláin. He left three sons and one daughter. His sons fought amongst themselves and with their cousin Muichertach, son of Brian of Slieve Bloom, for the succession in Thomond.

- Muirchertach Dall (King of Thomond, 1194-1198, restored 1202 or 1203-1208 or 1210, blinded 1208 or 1210, died 1239)
- Conchobar Ruadh (King of Thomond, 1198-1202 or 1203, killed 1202 or 1203)
- Donnchadh Cairbreach (King of Thomond, 1208 or 1210–1242)
- Mór Ní Briain (Queen Consort of Connaught)
- Princess (Ní Briain) of Thomond who married William de Burgh

== Ancestry ==
Ancestors of Domnall Mór Ua Briain

16. Tadhg mac Brian (died 1023)
8. Toirdhealbhach Ua Briain, High King of Ireland (died 1086)
17. Mór Ua Maíl Muaid
4. Diarmait Ua Briain, King of Munster (died 1118)
9. Dubchoblaig of the Uí Ceinnselaig
2. Toirdhealbhach mac Diarmada Ua Briain, King of Munster (died 1167)
20. Áed Ua Conchobair, King of Connacht (died 1067)
10. Ruaidrí Ua Conchobair, King of Connacht (died 1118)
5. Mór Ua Conchobair of Connacht
1. Domnall Mór Ua Briain
Donnchad mac Cellaig
Gilla Pátraic mac Donnchada
Donnchad mac Gilla Pátraic
Maelmuire
3. Sadb MacGillapatrick

== See also ==
- O'Brien dynasty
