= Forbasach mac Ailella =

- King of Osraige
- Reign: 735–740
- Predecessor: Cellach mac Fáelchair
- Successor: Anmchad mac Con Cherca
- Died: 760s
- Issue: Fáelán mac Forbasaig
- House: Dál Birn

Forbasach mac Ailella (died 740) was a King of Osraige in modern County Kilkenny. He ruled from 735 to 740.

His genealogy is not recorded in Rawlinson Genealogies; the annals record only that he was slain but give no details. His son Fáelán mac Forbasaig (died 786) was a King of Osraige.

The Book of Leinster king lists an Ailill mac Fáeláin as king prior to Cellach mac Fáelchair (died 735). This Ailill would be the brother of Cú Cherca mac Fáeláin (died 712) and son of Fáelán mac Crundmaíl (died 660), previous kings.
