= Fergal mac Anmchada =

- King of Osraige
- Reign: 772–786
- Predecessor: Máel Dúin mac Cummascaig
- Successor: Dúngal mac Fergaile
- Died: 802
- House: Dál Birn
- Father: Anmchad mac Con Cherca

Fergal mac Anmchada (died 802) was a King of Osraige in modern County Kilkenny. He was of the dynasty that ruled over Osraige in the early Christian period known as the Dál Birn and was the son of Anmchad mac Con Cherca (died circa 761), a previous and aggressive king.

The Osraige plunged into civil war upon the death of his father Anmchad. The annals record civil wars in 769–770 and 784. The exact year of his accession is unknown. The Book of Leinster king list mentions a king between the death of Fáelán mac Forbasaig (died 786) and the reign of Fergal who is not attested in the annals. Fergal is given a reign of five years in this list so would have been ruling by at least 797. With the accession of Fergal, the Osraige began a period of stability and direct father to brother or son succession in the 9th century.

The annals mention no data of Fergal other than his death obit in 802. His son Dúngal mac Fergaile (died 842) was also King of Osraige and he was grandfather of the powerful Osraige king Cerball mac Dúnlainge (died 888).
