= Ailill mac Fáeláin =

- King of Osraige
- Reign: after 712–before 728
- Predecessor: Fland mac Congaile
- Successor: Cellach mac Fáelchair
- Died: before 728
- House: Dál Birn
- Father: Fáelán mac Crundmaíl

Ailill mac Fáeláin was a King of Osraige in the south-east of Gaelic Ireland. Ailill was of the Dál Birn dynasty. Osraige was located in modern County Kilkenny, Ireland.

Ailill's year of accession is unknown, but it was after the reigns of both Cú Cherca mac Fáeláin, who died in 712, and Fland mac Congaile, whose reign is undated. The end of Ailill's reign is also unknown, but Cellach mac Fáelchair is recorded as king by 728.

Ailill is recorded in the king lists of the Book of Leinster, the synchronism's of Thurneysen, Boyle, and the Annals of Clonmacnoise. He is recorded as "Oillill" in the Annals of Clonmacnoise.

Ailill does not appear in the MS Rawlinson B 502 genealogies, but it is presumed that this Ailill was the son of Fáelán mac Crundmaíl (died 660) and the brother of Cú Cherca mac Fáeláin (died 712), who were both Kings of Osraige.

== Lineage ==
The Dál Birn (Old Irish: "the assembly" or "portion" of "Birn") is a tribal epithet found in Irish sources that refers to the descendants of Loegaire Birn Buadach, the hereditary ruling lineage of the Osraige in Ireland.

For a two-hundred year period beginning in the late fifth century, the native Dál Birn kings were temporarily displaced by an allied Corcu Loígde dynasty, which ruled Osraige until being overthrown. Several Corcu Loígde kings are recorded as being periodically slain by the native inhabitants of Osraige until the re-establishment of the Dál Birn.

Dál Birn descendants remained in control of parts of Osraige even after the Norman Invasion of Ireland, with the continuation of the Mac Giolla Phádraig lordship in Upper Ossory. This senior Dál Birn lineage historically remained the most visible and possessed an original portion of Osraige through the death of Bernard FitzPatrick, 2nd Baron Castletown in 1937.
