= Anmchad mac Con Cherca =

- King of Osraige
- Reign: 742–760s
- Predecessor: Forbasach mac Ailella
- Successor: Tóim Snáma mac Flainn
- Died: 760s
- Issue: Fergal mac Anmchada
- House: Dál Birn
- Father: Cú Cherca mac Fáeláin

Anmchad mac Con Cherca (died 760s) was king of Osraige, a kingdom largely situated in modern County Kilkenny and western County Laois and forming part of the kingdom and province of Munster in south and south-west Ireland. Anmchad was an active ruler, who mounted repeated campaigns against his eastern neighbours in Leinster.

== Background ==
The kingdom of Osraige, later anglicised as Ossory, was one of over 100 small kingdoms which existed in 8th century Ireland. The Osraige—their name means people of the Deer—inhabited much of modern County Kilkenny and parts of neighbouring County Laois. The most important churches were at Aghaboe (County Laois), chief church of Saint Cainnech, and at Seir Kieran (County Offaly), chief church of Saint Ciarán of Saighir.

While provided by learned men with an imposing genealogy stretching back into myth and legend, the ruling dynasty of Osraige to which Anmchad belonged appears to have come to power in the later 6th century. Colmán Mór son of Feradach appears in the life of Saint Cainnech of Aghaboe as king of Osraige, and Colmán's son Scandlán, who is mentioned in Adamnán's life of Saint Columba, appears also to have been king, dying in 643.

The succession of Osraige kings in the 7th century is obscure following the death of Scandlán and the kings who preceded Anmchad are little more than names. Anmchad's father Cú Cherca, was king and died c.713. Cellach mac Fáelchair, killed in 735 in a battle between Cathal mac Finguine and the Leinstermen, and Forbasach mac Ailella was probably killed in 740, but how and by whom is not recorded. Anmchad is presumed to have become king after Forbasach's death.

== Reign ==
Following the death of Cathal mac Finguine, Munster was ruled by a series of kings who left little of note to record in the Irish annals. While Donnchad Midi of Clann Cholmáin, chief king of the Uí Néill and High King of Ireland, waged a series of campaigns against the Uí Dúnlainge rulers of Leinster, there was no response from Munster and, according to the annals, Anmchad was the most militarily active Munster king in the middle of the 8th century.

The first record of Anmchad's reign is in 742, the year in which Cathal mac Finguine died. Here the Annals of Ulster and the Annals of Tigernach state the Osraige devastated the lands of Cenél Fiachach and Delbna. These lay across the valley of the River Brosna, between Durrow Abbey and the River Shannon, in modern County Offaly. Probably following this, perhaps in 745, Anmchad defeated the Déisi Mumain, of what is now the east of County Waterford, killing their king Uargus mac Fiachrae. The following year Anmchad defeated and killed the three sons of Cumascrach, but who Cumascrach and his sons were, and the reasons why Anmchad was at war with them are now lost.

The principal target of Anmchad's later wars was Leinster, and in particular the kingdoms and peoples of southern Leinster, modern County Carlow, chief among which were Uí Bairrche Tire and Uí Cheinnselaig. It may be that the battle at Inis Snaic which Anmchad won, against whom is not stated, recorded in about 750, concerned Leinster. in 754 when the Osraige ravaged a territory to their east known as Fotharta Fea, in the eastern portion of modern Carlow. In 759, and again in 761, Anmchad fought at Belach Gabraín—the pass of Gowran—the main route between south Leinster and Osraige. Both times he defeated the Leinstermen, and in the second battle Donngal mac Laidcnén, king of Uí Cheinnselaig, was killed.

No mention of Anmchad is found in the Irish annals after the death of Donngal mac Laidcnén. In 769 a war among the Osraige is recorded in which Tóim Snáma mac Flainn, apparently now ruling Osraige, defeated the sons of Anmchad's predecessor Cellach, among whom will have been his eventual successor Dúngal mac Cellaig. Accordingly, is presumed that Anmchad died at some time between his last appearance in 761 and the coming to power of Tóim Snáma in 769 or earlier. Anmchad had at least one son who survived him, Fergal mac Anmchada, who was also king of Osraige and died in 802.
