= Tóim Snáma mac Flainn =

- King of Osraige
- Reign: 761–770
- Predecessor: Anmchad mac Con Cherca
- Successor: Dúngal mac Cellaig
- Died: 770
- House: Dál Birn
- Father: Fland mac Congaile

Tóim Snáma mac Flainn (died 770) was a King of Osraige in modern County Kilkenny. He ruled from circa 761 to 770. His exact year of accession is unknown, 761 was the last year his predecessor Anmchad mac Con Cherca was named in the annals.

The dynasty that ruled over Osraige in the early Christian period was known as the Dál Birn. Tóim Snáma was the son of Fland mac Congaile, a king who ruled sometime after 712 who is mentioned in the king list of the Book of Leinster but not in the annals. His great grandfather was a brother of Scannlan Mór mac Colmáin (died 644), a previous king.

The Osraige plunged into civil war upon the death of Anmchad. Tóim Snáma was opposed by the sons of Cellach mac Fáelchair (d. 735), and presumably Dúngal mac Cellaig (d. 772). In 769 he was successful in battle versus them and they were put to flight. In 770 he was slain presumably by Dúngal, his successor.
