= Land ingen Dúngaile =

Ossery princess

- Princess of Osraige; Queen consort of Loíchsi; Queen consort of Ireland
- Died: 890; Clonmacnoise, County Offaly
- Spouse: Gáethíne mac Cináeda of Loíchsi; Máel Sechnaill mac Máele Ruanaid; Áed Findliath
- Issue: Cennétig mac Gáethíne; Flann Sinna
- House: Dál Birn
- Father: Dúngal mac Fergaile

Land ingen Dúngaile (died 890 AD) (sometimes spelled Lann or Flann; her patronymic sometimes Dúnlainge) was a Dál Birn princess of Osraige who was a noteworthy figure in Irish politics during a critical time in Viking-age Ireland.

== Life ==
She was the daughter of king Dúngal mac Fergaile (r. 802–842) of Osraige, a kingdom which witnessed a dramatic rise to power under the rule of her war-like brother Cerball mac Dúnlainge (r. 842–888), in which she had a hand. She was married three times to successive kings, and as such appears to have had a central role in cementing alliances between rival Irish kingdoms, but also in urging her husbands towards hostilities against Viking threats. As queen, she became the mother and grandmother to several noteworthy Irish kings, and is remembered as an exemplar for female nobility in Irish verse and genealogical texts. After the death of Cerball in 888, her brother Riagan mac Dúnlainge succeeded the Ossorian throne.

== Marriages ==
Princess Land had three famous husbands, who were kings in their own right; two of which reigned as High King over Ireland.

She first married king Gáethíne mac Cináeda of Loíchsi from a territory neighboring her home region of Osraige by whom she had a son, Cennétig mac Gáethíne, (d. 903), who also later reigned as king of Loíchsi.

She was married again to the famous High King of all Ireland, Máel Sechnaill mac Máele Ruanaid (r. 846 to 862) and gave birth to his formidable son Flann Sinna who was also High King from 879 to 916. She is thus also the grandmother of Flann's son, High King Donnchadh Donn mac Flainn. Her marriage to Máel Sechnaill is largely seen as part of a political alliance between the Dál Birn of Osraige and the Clann Cholmáin dynasty of Southern Uí Néill, as her brother Cerball mac Dúnlainge, king of Osraige also wedded Máel Sechnaill's daughter as an agreement in alienating Osraige away from the greater polity of Munster. The dual marriages however did not cease fighting between the two dynasties. Máel Sechnaill died in 862.

On Máel Sechnaill's death, the Uí Néill kingship passed back to the northern branch, represented by Áed Findliath mac Néill, son of Niall Caille, who began his reign by marrying Land, which was Áed's second marriage and Land's third. Áed died in 879.

Land ingen Dúngaile, princess of Osraige and queen of Tara, died in piety and penance at the monastery of Clonmacnoise in 890.

== Legacy ==
The Book of Uí Maine contains the following short genealogy of Land inserted into an entry of the Ban Shenchus: "Land ingen Dungaili m. Feargaili m. Athaidha m. Con Cearca m. Faelain m. Crundmail m. Ronain Rig-flaite m. Scandlain Moir m. Cind Faelad rig Oisrige, mathair Fhlaind m. Mael tSecland."

The Fragmentary Annals of Ireland relate this entry on queen Land for the year 866: In this year Áed son of Niall, king of Ireland, massacred the Norwegians and harried them all. Áed had a great victory over the Norwegians at Loch Febail. The learned related that it was his wife who most incited Áed against the Norwegians—namely Land, daughter of Dúnlang: and she was the one who was Máel Sechlainn's wife previously, and the mother of Máel Sechlainn's son, i.e. Flann. She was the mother of Cennétig son of Gáethíne, king of Loíches. Now the ills that the Norwegians suffered this year are noteworthy, but the greatest they encountered were from Áed Findliath son of Niall.

The Banshenchas mention Land, saying: "Land daughter of Dungal son of Fergal, king of Ossory of the steeds, was called the mother (no mistaken delay) of Fland son of Mael Sechlaind of the swathes."

The Annals of the Four Masters state concerning her repose in 886: Flann, daughter of Dunghal, wife of Maelsechlainn, son of Maelruain, King of Ireland, and who was the mother of Flann Sinna, died after a good life, and after penance at Cluain Mic Nois; and she was there interred.
