= Donnchad mac Cellaig =

- King of Osraige (934-976)
- Predecessor: Cuilen mac Cellaig
- Successor: Cellach mac Diarmata
- Died: 976
- Issue: Gilla Pátraic mac Donnchada
- Dynasty: Dál Birn
- Father: Cellach mac Cerbaill

Donnchad mac Cellaig (also called Donnchadh Ramhor, or the Fat) reigned as king of Osraige from AD 934 to 976. He was the son of Cellach mac Cerbaill, king of Osraige (died c. 908) and his wife, Echrad ingen Matudán. He succeeded to the throne on the death of his brother Cuilen, and ruled his native territory with great distinction and credit to himself for more than 40 years.

== Life ==
Donnachad mac Cellaig's kingdom had been greatly strengthened in the time of his grandfather, Cerball mac Dunlainge, but witnessed brief power struggles within the ruling family during his father's time.

Osraige rendered hostages to Muircheartach mac Neill, prince of Aileach, who was brother-in-law to Donnachad by his sister Dubhdara. He gained several victories over the Leinstermen in (946, 972) and Norse (962), suffering losses in 972 in the region of the western Liffey.

Like his father, he is regarded as a pious and generous king, who attended to the needs of the poor in his domain, bolstered the Irish Church, and named one of his sons in honor of St. Patrick; namely Gilla Pátraic mac Donnchada, who later succeeded to the throne of Osraige. He rests with his forefathers in the churchyard of Saighir Chiarain, and is thus eulogized by Dr. Lynch:

'Donnchadh King of Ossory son of Cellach and father in law of Donnchadh son of Flann King of Ireland, was a man of singular piety. He devoted much of his time to prayer to Almighty God, frequently purged away the stains of his soul by confession, and strengthened himself in virtue by frequent communion. By his zeal all the principal churches in Ossory were enabled to dispense by the privileges of the Apostles, very liberal charity to the poor: great numbers of his friends also took orphans and other poor, under their protection; every house in Ossory was obliged by his orders to have three vessels, in one of which each inmate deposited a tenth of his food; in another was kept the portion of the poor commonly called Mihal [i.e. Mir Michil, portio Sancti Michaelis]; and in the third which may be called crematha, were kept the crumbs and fragments which were specially under the care of the mistress of the house.

The Kings of Ossory are honoured by our annalists with a peculiar distinction, not given to the princes of other minor territories. In giving the synchronism of the Kings of the Pentarchy with the supreme monarchs of Ireland, they give the succession of the Kings of Ossory as well as of Leinster, Connacht, Munster, and Ulster, on the principle perhaps not of territorial extent but of the superior virtue of the princes."

== Legacy ==
Donnchadh died peacefully in 976 in old age and had the following issue:

1) Gillapatrick, his successor. 2) Diarmaid Tanist of Ossory slain in 972. 3). Muireadhach, Tanist of Ossory, who died in 973. 4) Dunghal, Tanist of Ossory, who died in 979. 5) Tadhg, Tanist of Ossory, slain in 991. 6) Mor, Queen of Ireland, died in 985. 7) Sadhbh or Sabia, Queen of Ireland by her marriage to Donnchadh son of Flann Sionna (r.919 to 944).
