= Fáelán mac Forbasaig =

- King of Osraige
- Reign: 772–786
- Predecessor: Dúngal mac Cellaig
- Successor: Máel Dúin mac Cummascaig; Fergal mac Anmchada
- Died: 786
- House: Dál Birn
- Father: Forbasach mac Ailella

Fáelán mac Forbasaig (died 786) was a King of Osraige in modern County Kilkenny. He was of the dynasty that ruled over Osraige in the early Christian period known as the Dál Birn and was the son of Forbasach mac Ailella (died 740), a previous king. He ruled from 772 to 786.

The Osraige plunged into civil war after the death of Anmchad mac Con Cherca circa 761. In 786 the annals record that Fáelán was slain in internal conflict among the Osraige.
