= Gilla Pátraic mac Donnchada =

- King of Osraige
- Predecessor: Donnchad mac Cellaig
- Successor: Cellach mac Diarmata
- Died: 996
- Wife: Maelmuire
- Issue: Donnchad mac Gilla Pátraic
- Dynasty: Dál Birn/Mac Giolla Phádraig dynasty
- Father: Donnchad mac Cellaig

Gilla Pátraic mac Donnchada (died 996) was king of Osraige and the progenitor from whom all Mac Giolla Phádraigs (Fitzpatricks) of Ossory took their hereditary surname. Gilla Pátraic succeeded his father Donnchad mac Cellaig in 976. Donnchad mac Cellaig was the son of Cellach mac Cerbaill, king of Osraige (died c. 908) and his wife, Echrad ingen Matudán. After a reign of 21 years, Gilla Pátraic was slain by Donnabhan, king of the Danes of Waterford, and Domhnall, king of the Desies. By his wife, Maelmuire, he had five sons: (1) Donnchad mac Gilla Pátraic, king of Osraige and king of Leinster; (2) Dunghal (slain 1016); (3) Tadhg (blinded 1027); (4) Diarmaid (slain 1036); and, (5) Muircheartach (slain 1036).
