= Riagan mac Dúnlainge =

Irish regional king (9th century)

- King of Osraige
- Reign: 888–894
- Predecessor: Cerball mac Dúnlainge
- Successor: Diarmait mac Cerbaill
- House: Dál Birn
- Father: Dúngal mac Fergaile

Riagan mac Dúnlainge (sometimes spelled Riacán; patronymic sometimes spelled Dúngaile) was king of Osraige from 888 to 894 AD.

== History ==
King Riagan was the son of king Dúngal mac Fergaile, of the Dál Birn lineage of Osraige. He peacefully succeeded to the throne of Osraige upon the death of his older brother Cerball mac Dúnlainge in 888. He was also brother to the influential princess Land ingen Dúngaile. William Carrigan states that Riagan must have been aged upon ascending the throne, as his brother's famous reign lasted over forty years. The Annals of the Four Masters record him winning a victory over the Vikings of Waterford:

FM888.6: A battle was gained by Riagan, son of Dunghal, over the foreigners of Port Lairge, Loch Carman, and Teach Moling, in which two hundred heads were left behind.

Whether king Riagan died or abdicated on account of age is not known; he was succeeded by his nephew Diarmait mac Cerbaill.

Regnal titles
Preceded by Cerball mac Dúnlainge	King of Osraige; 888-894	Succeeded by Diarmait mac Cerbaill
