= Considine =

Considine is an Irish surname anglicised from the Gaelic form Mac Consaidín meaning "son of Consaidín" being derived from a foreign Christian name; meaning "son of Constantine". According to historian C. Thomas Cairney, the MacConsidines were one of the chiefly families of the Dal gCais or Dalcassians who were a tribe of the Erainn who were the second wave of Celts to settle in Ireland between about 500 and 100 BC. The family were based in Kingdom of Thomond, much of which later became County Clare. The ancestor of the family was Consaidín Ua Briain, a Bishop of Killaloe who died in 1194 and who was the son of Toirdhealbhach mac Diarmada Ua Briain. Notable people with the surname include:

- A family prominent in American entertainment:
  - John Considine (Seattle), pioneering vaudeville impresario, producer of 48 movies (1925–1943)
  - His son Bob Considine, political reporter and newspaper columnist
  - Grandson John Considine (III), an actor
  - Grandson Tim Considine, also an actor

Other people with this name are:

- Andrew Considine, a Scottish footballer with Aberdeen FC
- Dave Considine, American state representative from Wisconsin
- Hubert D. Considine (1919–2019) American politician and businessman
- Ciara Considine, English Celtic musician
- Clare Considine, American political strategist
- Dr. Craig Considine, Rice University Professor, Houston, TX
- J. D. Considine, American music journalist
- John J. Considine, American politician
- Michael Considine, Australian politician
- Michael Considine (poet), author of the Irish folk song "Spancill Hill"
- Nuala Considine (1927–2018), Irish crossword compiler
- Paddy Considine (born 1973), British actor
- Pat Considine (1875–1918), Australian rules footballer
- Seán Considine, defensive back for the Philadelphia Eagles, Baltimore Ravens (Super Bowl XLVII champions), and Jacksonville Jaguars
- Ulick Considine (1901–1950), English cricketer
- Ailish Considine, Australian rules footballer for the Adelaide Crows.
- Eimear Considine, Irish Rugby player and presenter for Eir Sport and TG4
  - Tom Considine, famous IT professional.

== See also ==
- Irish clans
