= Fáelchar ua Máele Ódrain =

Fáelchar Ua Máele Ódrain
- King of Osraige
- Reign: 678–693
- Predecessor: Tuaim Snámha
- Successor: Cú Cherca mac Fáeláin
- Died: 693 AD
- Issue: Cellach mac Fáelchair
- House: Dál Birn
- Father: Forandl

Fáelchar Ua Máele Ódrain (died 693) or Fáelchar mac Forandla was a King of Osraige in modern County Kilkenny.

He is called the grandson of Máel Ódra in the Irish annals. The genealogies state that Máel Ódra was the son of Scannlan Mór mac Colmáin (died 644), a previous king of Osraige. The father of Fáelchar is named as Forandl. The dynasty that ruled over Osraige in the early Christian period was known as the Dál Birn. He may have ruled from 678 to 693.

Osraige was part of the kingdom of Munster at this time and conflicts between Osraige and the men of Leinster, the Laigin, are recorded in the annals for the seventh and eight centuries. In 693, Fáelchar was slain in a battle with the Laigin.

His son Cellach mac Fáelchair (died 735) was also King of Osraige.
