= Diarmait mac Cerbaill (King of Osraige) =

- King of Osraige
- Reign: 894–905; 908–928
- Predecessor: Riagan mac Dúnlainge; Cellach mac Cerbaill
- Successor: Cellach mac Cerbaill; Cuilen mac Cellaig
- House: Dál Birn
- Father: Cerball mac Dúnlainge
- Mother: daughter of high-king Máel Sechnaill mac Máele Ruanaid

Diarmait mac Cerbaill was a king of Osraige from 894 to 905, and again from 908 to 928 AD.

== History ==
He was a son of Cerball mac Dúnlainge of the Dál Birn lineage, and his mother was the daughter of high-king Máel Sechnaill mac Máele Ruanaid. He appears to have been militarily active after the death of his father. In 891, he won a victory over the Eóganachta of Munster with the men of Leinster. Diarmait succeeded his uncle Riagan mac Dúnlainge to the throne of Osraige. He was deposed in 905 and his brother Cellach was put in his stead. After Cellach's death in 908, he returned to the kingship by his cousin Flann Sinna the high king, and ruled for another twenty years, reposing in 928.

He is remembered in the Banshenchas thus: "The mother of Diarmait son of Cerball, hero of the brilliant Ossorians, and of Tadg son of perfect Concobar (noble, wealthy, destructive and impetuous) was the daughter in of brown poetical Mael Sechlaind of the main-line of famous Mael Ruanaid."

== See also ==
- Diarmait mac Cerbaill
- Kingdom of Ossory
- Kings of Osraige

Regnal titles
Preceded by Riagan mac Dúnlainge	King of Osraige; 894-905 (deposed); 908-928 (reinstated)	Succeeded by Cellach mac Cerbaill; Cuilen mac Cellaig
