= Toirdhealbhach mac Diarmada Ua Briain =

King of Munster

Toirdhealbhach mac Diarmada Ua Briain was King of Munster in an interrupted reign from 1142 to 1165.

== Reign ==
He was the son of Diarmaid Ua Briain, King of Munster. He began his reign as King of Munster in 1142. He was deposed by his brother Tadhg in 1151 but resumed his reign after Tadhg's death in 1154. In 1157, Munster was invaded by the Northern High King, Muirchertach Mac Lochlainn, Toirdhealbhach was banished, and Munster was divided between his cousin Conchobhar Mac Domhnaill Ó Briain and Cormac Mac Carthaigh by Muircheartach. He was restored to power in North Munster later in 1157 by the King of Connacht, Ruaidrí Ua Conchobair who invaded Munster and overturned Muircheartach's arrangement. He was deposed by his son Muircheartach in 1165 and died in 1167. He was interred at Killaloe.

== Family ==
He married firstly a daughter of the Mac Carthaigh Mór who died without issue. He married secondly Sadb MacGillapatrick, daughter of Donnchad mac Gilla Pátraic, King of Ossory (died 1039) and had six sons:

- Domhnaill Mór
- Muircheartach (succeeded his father)
- Brian
- Diarmaid
- Consaidin, Bishop of Killaloe (died 1194) (ancestor of the MacConsaidín family)
