= Scandlán Mór =

Scandlán Mór may refer to:

- Scannlan Mór mac Cinn Fáelad (died 644), King of Osraige.
- Scandlán Mór, a poet from the Middle Irish era, given as the author of Is é mo shámud re mnái/Advice to lovers.
