= Dúngal mac Cellaig =

- King of Osraige
- Reign: 770–772
- Predecessor: Tóim Snáma mac Flainn
- Successor: Fáelán mac Forbasaig
- Died: 772
- House: Dál Birn
- Father: Cellach mac Fáelchair

Dúngal mac Cellaig (died 772) was a King of Osraige in modern County Kilkenny. He ruled from 770 to 772. He was of the dynasty known as the Dál Birn that ruled over Osraige in the early Christian period and was the son of Cellach mac Fáelchair (died 735), a previous king.

The Osraige plunged into civil war upon the death of Anmchad mac Con Cherca after 761. Tóim Snáma mac Flainn was opposed by the sons of Cellach, presumably Dúngal and in 761 they were defeated by Tóim Snáma and were put to flight. In 770 Tóim Snáma was slain presumably by Dúngal.
