= Cellach mac Cerbaill =

- King of Osraige
- Reign: 905-908 AD
- Predecessor: Diamait mac Cerbaill (first reign; deposed)
- Successor: Diarmait mac Cerbaill (reinstated)
- Died: 908 AD
- Burial: Probably Saighir
- Spouse: Echrad ingen Matudáin
- Issue: Cuilen mac Cellaig; Donnchad mac Cellaig
- House: Dál Birn
- Father: Cerball mac Dúnlainge

Cellach mac Cerbaill (some sources "Callough"; nicknamed Cellach of the Hard Conflicts) was king of Osraige from 905 to his death in 908.

== History ==
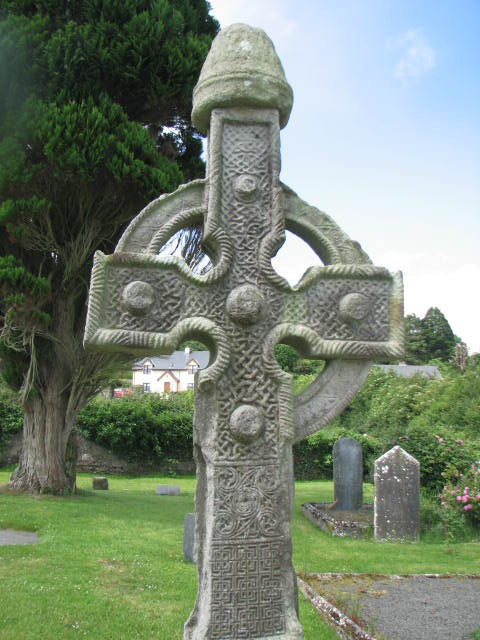
A panel on the base of the North Cross at Ahenny, County Tipperary (on the border of Munster and Osraige) depicts a funeral procession, sometimes supposed to be that of Cormac mac Cuilennáin after the battle in which he and king Cellach mac Cerbaill were killed.

Cellach mac Cerbaill was a son of Cerball mac Dúnlainge, king of Osraige (died c. 888). Cellach was married to Echrad ingen Matudáin, daughter of Matudán mac Aeda, king of Ulaid (or Ulster) (died c. 950), by whom he had a son, Donnchad mac Cellaig, king of Osraige (died c. 976). Matudán mac Aeda was the son of Áed mac Eochocáin (died c. 919), son of Eochocán mac Áedo (died c. 883) and his wife, Inderb ingen Máel Dúin of the Cenél nEógain, daughter of Máel Dúin mac Áeda, king of Ailech (died c. 867). Máel Dúin mac Áeda was the son of Áed Oirdnide mac Néill, king of Ailech (died c. 819), a member of the Cenél nEógain dynasty of the northern Uí Néill.

Cellach took part in the battle of Gowran in 893. He came to the throne after the deposition of his older brother Diarmait in 905. Cellach was slain in the battle of Mag Ailbe fighting on the side of the illustrious king-bishop of Cashel Cormac mac Cuilennáin in 908. The Annals of Inisfallen record Cellach mac Cerbaill's death in 908:

AI908.2: The battle of Mag Ailbe gained by the Laigin and the Uí Néill over the Munstermen, in which Cormac son of Cuilennán, king of Caisel, and Cellach son of Cerball, king of Osraige, fell.

However, the Annals of the Four Masters state that this conflict was called the Battle of Bealach-Mughna and assign it to have taken place in 903:

M903.7: The battle of Bealach-Mughna was fought by Flann, son of Maelseachlainn, King of Ireland, and Cearbhall, son of Muirigen, King of Leinster, and by Cathal, son of Conchobhar, King of Connaught, against Cormac, son of Cuileannan, King of Caiseal. The battle was gained over Cormac, and he himself was slain, though his loss was mournful, for he was a king, a bishop, an anchorite, a scribe, and profoundly learned in the Scotic tongue. These were the nobles who fell along with him, name, Fogartach the Wise, son of Suibhne, lord of Ciarraighe-Cuirche; Ceallach, son of Cearbhall, lord of Osraighe; Maelgorm, lord of Ciarraighe-Luachra; Maelmorda, lord of Raith-linn; Ailill, son of Eoghan, Abbot of Trian-Corcaighe; Colman, Abbot of Ceann-Eitigh; and the lord of Corca-Duibhne; and many other nobles besides them, and six thousand men along with them. It was in commemoration of this the following lines were composed by Dallan, son of Mor: "Cormac of Feimhin, Fogartach, Colman, Ceallach of the hard conflicts, They perished with many thousands in the great battle of Bealach-Mughna. Flann of Teamhair, of the plain of Tailltin, Cearbhall of Carman without fail, On the seventh of the Calends of September, gained the battle of which hundreds were joyful. The bishop, the souls' director, the renowned, illustrious doctor, King of Caiseal, King of Iarmumha; O God! alas for Cormac!"

His brother Diarmait was afterwards reinstated to the throne by their first cousin, high king Flann Sinna.

== Legacy ==
He was ancestor of the later medieval Mac Giolla Phádraig family, and the Icelandic Landnámabók (in which he is called Kjallakr Kjarvalson) names him as an ancestor of some of Iceland's early settlers.

== See also ==
- Kingdom of Ossory
- Kings of Osraige

Regnal titles
Preceded by Diarmait mac Cerbaill	King of Osraige; 905-908	Succeeded by Diarmait mac Cerbaill
