= Ailbe of Emly =

Irish saint (died early 6th century)

Saint Ailbe or Elvis
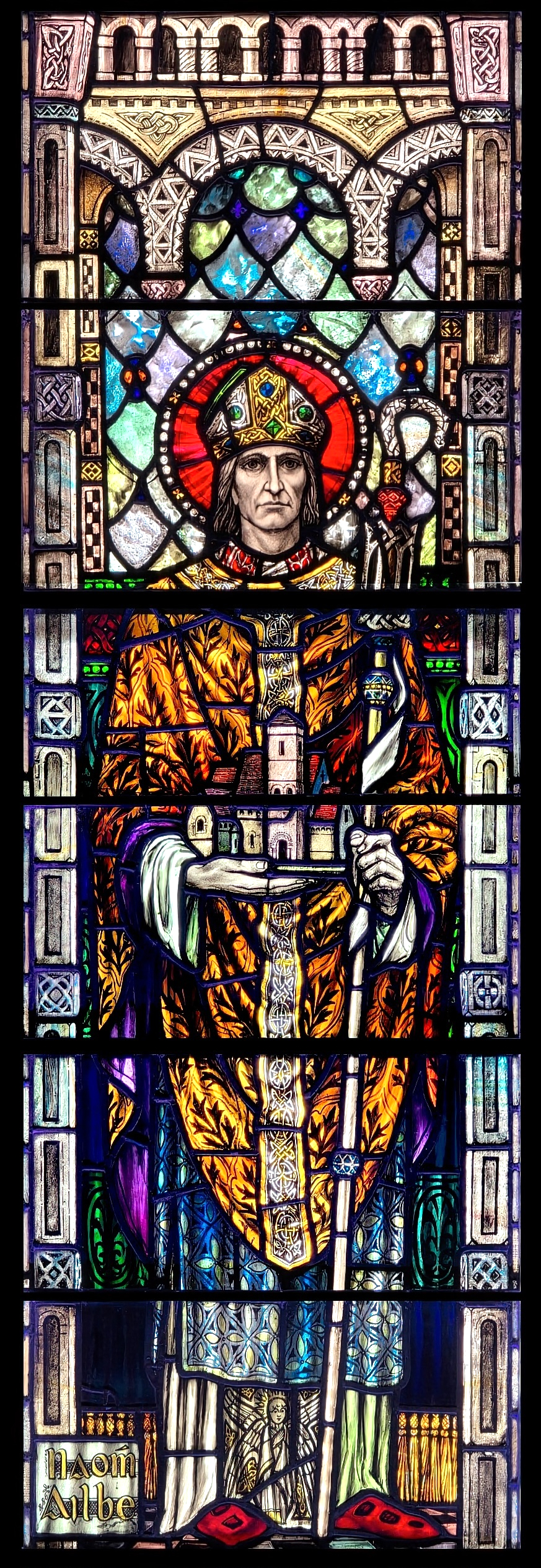
- St. Ailbe by Alfred Child at the Honan Chapel
- Born: 5th Century
- Died: 528
- Venerated in: Roman Catholic Church; Eastern Orthodox Church
- Canonized: Pre-Congregation
- Feast: 12 September
- Patronage: Munster, the Archdiocese of Cashel and Emly, wolves

Saint Ailbe (Irish: Ailbhe [ˈalʲəvʲə]; Latin: Albeus, Alibeus), usually known in English as St Elvis (British/Welsh), Eilfyw or Eilfw, was regarded as the chief 'pre-Patrician' saint of Ireland (although his death was recorded in the early 6th-century). He was a bishop and later saint.

Little that can be regarded as reliable is known about Ailbe: in Irish sources from the 8th century he is regarded as the first bishop, and later patron saint of Emly in Munster. Later Welsh sources (from the 11th c.) associate him with Saint David whom he was credited with baptizing and very late sources (16th c.) even give him a local Welsh genealogy making him an Ancient Briton.

Saint Ailbe is venerated as one of the four great patrons of Ireland. His feast day is 12 September. He is the patron saint of the Archdiocese of Cashel and Emly.

== Sources ==
The life of Ailbe is included in the Vitae Sanctorum Hiberniae (VSH), a Latin collection of medieval Irish saints' lives compiled in the 14th century. There are three major manuscript versions of the VSH: the Dublin, Oxford, and Salamanca. Charles Plummer compiled an edition of the VSH based on the two surviving Dublin manuscripts in 1910.

Professor William W. Heist of the University of Michigan compiled an edition of the single Salamanca manuscript in 1965 Oxford professor Richard Sharpe suggests that the Salamanca manuscript is the closest to the original text from which all three versions derive. Sharpe's analysis of the Irish name-forms in the Codex Salamanticensis showed similarities between it and the Life of Saint Brigid, a verifiably 7th-century text, leading him to posit that nine (and possibly ten) of the lives were written much earlier, c. 750–850.

He further proposed that this earlier Life of Ailbe in the Codex Salmanticensis was originally composed to further the cause of the Eóganacht Church of Emly. The Law of Ailbe (784) was issued, possibly in response to the Law of Patrick.

The later lives of the Dublin collection go further and make Ailbe the principal 'pre-Patrican' Saint of Ireland (the others are Ciarán of Saighir, Declan of Ardmore, Abbán of Moyarney and Ibar of Beggerin or Beggery Island) The Dublin Life of Ailbe asserts that Munster was entrusted to him by Saint Patrick, while to similar effect, Ailbe is called a "second Patrick and patron of Munster" (secundus Patricius et patronus Mumenie) in the Life of Saint Declán of Ardmore.

Further material is provided by the lives of related saints such as Patrick. All include numerous miraculous events and obvious inconsistencies and anachronisms. In fact the earliest mention of the name Ailbeus would seem to be in Tirechan's late 7th century Life of Saint Patrick although this seems to be about a different 'Ailbe', a priest associated with the Ui Aillello, in Connaught, latterly known as 'Saint Ailbe of Sencua (Shancoe in County Sligo)'. Other early mentions of Ailbe are in the 8th century Navigatio Brendani ("Voyage of Saint Brendan") and in the Martyrology of Tallaght and Martyrology of Oengus from the early years of the 9th century.

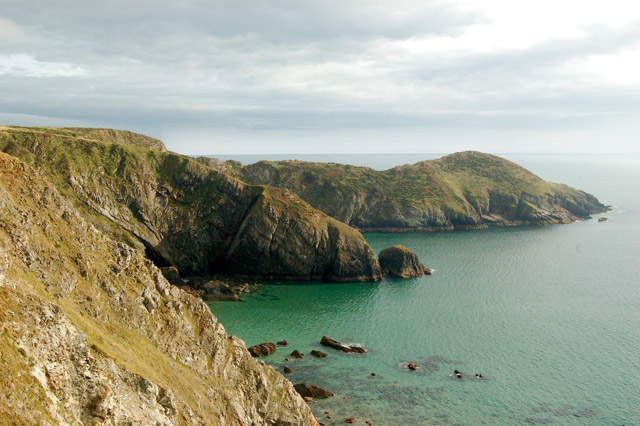
St Elvis, Pembrokeshire today

== Legendary life ==
In a legend that goes back to the Vita, or 'Saint's Life', Ailbe's father fled King Cronan before the child's birth and his mother's servants—ordered by the king to put the baby to death—instead placed him on a rock in the wilderness where he was found and nursed by a she-wolf. Long afterwards, when Ailbe was bishop, an old she-wolf being pursued by a hunting party ran to the bishop and laid her head upon his breast. Ailbe protected the wolf and thereafter fed her and her cubs every day from his hall. Ailbe was discovered in the forest by visiting Britons: these British foster parents were said to have planned to leave him in Ireland when they returned home but were constantly and miraculously unable to make the passage until they consented to take him with them. They then took Ailbe with them when they returned to Wales (Vita Albei 2).

A tradition also going back to the earliest Vita (Vita Albei 9) held that he went to Rome and was ordained as a bishop by Saint Hilary who was then pope. Upon being ordained in Rome, he was said to have fed the people of the city for three days before returning home. At the end of his life, a supernatural ship came and he boarded to learn the secret of his death. Returning from the faerie world, he went back to Emly to die and be buried.

The earliest Vita states that Saint Ailbe was baptised by Palladius (Vita Albei 2), something that might be compatible with the tradition that made him a 'pre-Patrician' evangelizer of Ireland (since Palladius was recorded as having been sent to Ireland in 431, most likely before Patrick's time). The year of his death – 528 - that is recorded in the 'Annals of Innisfallen' (compiled at Emly probably in 1092), is not, however, compatible with a 'pre-Patrician' career. It may well be, though, a reflection of the fact that many such obits (records of the date of death) of Irish saints were retrospectively added to the annals.

Ailbe was said to have founded the monastery and diocese of Emly (Irish: Imlech (Note: The diocese's full name in Gaelic is Imleach Iubhair, the "Border of the Lake of the Yew Trees", a reminder of the pre-Christian history of Emly.)), which became very important in Munster. He was said to have been responsible for King Aengus's donation of island lands for Saint Enda's monastery. He is also associated with the 6th-century foundation of Clane Friary, in modern County Kildare.

== Connections with Wales ==
The Life of Saint David, written by Rhigyfarch in the late 11th century, states that Ailbe baptized Saint David, the patron saint of Wales. In Welsh traditions, he then fostered the boy while serving as bishop of Menevia (present-day St David's) before leaving on a mission to convert southern Ireland. He was also regarded as the founder of Llanailfyw or St Elvis in Pembrokeshire,

Late Welsh sources give him a British ancestry. Thus the 16th c. Achau’r Saint records "Eilvyw a Dirdan Saint Breudan" (variant : "Breudain") while a 16thc. Manuscript of Bonedd y Saint records "Ailvyw vab Dirdan". This would make him a descendant of Guorthemir (Modern Welsh: Gwerthefyr; English: Vortimer the Blessed), and a cousin of saints David, Cybi, and Sadyrnin.

== Possible pre-Christian origins ==
Professor Pádraig Ó Riain suggests the cult of Saint Ailbe may have pre-Christian origins. The name Ailbe figures quite extensively in a context of Irish folk tale, with its likely origins mainly in pre-Christian pagan mythology. For instance Ailbe was the name of the 'divine hound' in "The Tale of Mac Da Thó's Pig" associated with the Mag Ailbe or 'plain of Ailbe', where stood a Lia Ailbe, or 'stone of Ailbe'. The 'divine hound' Ailbe defended Leinster, the chief centre of which was Aillen, whose female eponym, Aillen, owned a marvellous lap dog Ailbe, according to the 'Metrical Dindsenchas'.To these 'canine' associations, one might compare the tradition which identified Ailbe's father as ‘Ol-chu’ (‘Olcnais’ in Vita Albei 1), 'great-hound', as well as the (likely related) story of the infant Ailbe being cared for by a she-wolf.

An ‘Ailbe Grúadbrecc’, meanwhile, was the daughter of Cormac mac Airt (premier mythical Irish king) and a wife (as her sister Gráinne) of Finn (= literally, 'white') or Fionn mac Cumhaill in the Tochmarc Ailbe, Echtrae Cormaic maic Airt and "The Burning of Finn's House". Ailbe was also the name of several of Finn's fianna (comrades in his band), and their women in Acallam na Senórach and Duanaire Finn. An Ailbe was also daughter of Mider, son of the Dagda.

== The name "Ailbe" ==
The name Ailbe was explained in the Vita Albei as a derivative of ail 'a rock' and beo, 'living'. In the words of Baring Gould and Fisher this is "a very doubtful etymology". It is clearly related to the story of his being exposed behind a rock after his birth, before being cared for by a wolf (Vita Albei 2) and looks very much like folk etymology. Nevertheless, we can note a sporadic association of Ailbe (as a saint or mythological figure) with ' rocks' (Irish ail). The Lia Ailbe (stone of Ailbe) on the Magh Ailbe (plain of Ailbe) may be in origin tautological, while a Sliabh Ailbe was associated with a legendary figure Ailbe in Duanaire Finn. The Inbher Ailbhine mentioned in Tirechan's Vita Patricii (Tirechan 5.2) may contain ail, 'a rock', according to Watson. It is at a "marvellous stone altar ( = prominent rock with religious associations ) on the mountain of the Ui Ailello" where Patrick was said to have installed the second St Ailbe (of Sencua) - probably at the old site of the church of Shancoe, County Sligo, where a large rock overlooks a well:. This might all be best explained by a typical process of sound assimilation of ail 'a rock' to the name ail-be.

The root albho- 'white, bright' as in Latin albus, 'white' appears to figure in the names of various deities or semi-deities, or names with likely mythological associations, hence the Mons Albanus. Albula as an old name for the Tiber and the legendary Alba Longa in Latium; the Germanic deities Albiahenae the semi-divine prophetess, Albruna mentioned by Tacitus (Vulgar Latin Aurinia: Germania 8) or the spiritual or demonic beings from the Germanic world, which are represented in modern English by the word, 'elf'; the Alphito which was recorded as the name of an 'ogress' or 'nursery bugbear' and might well have been appropriate to an earlier strata of Greek gods; and possibly the ‘R̥bhus’ of Indian mythology and the Rhig Veda. This root may also be found in the names of Celtic deities such as Albarinus, Albocelo (if they do not contain Latin Albus) and possibly the deity Albius recorded in a single inscription from Aignay-le Duc,.

However the root albho- 'white, bright' does not figure in Irish or in fact in any of the extant Celtic languages. It may figure in the Celtic language of ancient Gaul (as in the names above) but there it may, in fact, have been borrowed from the ancient Ligurian language (the root is very common in place names from ancient Liguria). There does, however, appear the root albi(i̭)o-, 'world' in the Brittonic Celtic languages: as seen for instance in Wesh elfydd, 'world, land'. In fact, this root has convincingly been argued to be related to the root albho- 'white, bright' and it certainly appears in the Gaulish divine name albio-rix ("king of the world", parallel to Dumno-rix and Bitu-rix of similar meaning) . However it does not appear in Irish, with one sole exception: the Irish name for 'Britain', that is the Irish version of the name Albion found in ancient sources as the oldest recorded name for Britain. This appears in Irish as Albe-, Alpe- and Albu, Alpu. There is, however, no obvious explanation for this name to appear in the form ailbe and the root albi(i̭)o- would not take that form in Irish, according to the way that language normally developed. The i, in the ai of Ailbe, is not a full vowel but represents an audible 'glide' before a palatalised l. This palatalised l, with i-glide is not found in Irish Albu, 'Britain'.

All of this renders the precise form of the name Ailbe, in Irish, arguably, somewhat mysterious.

== Legacy ==
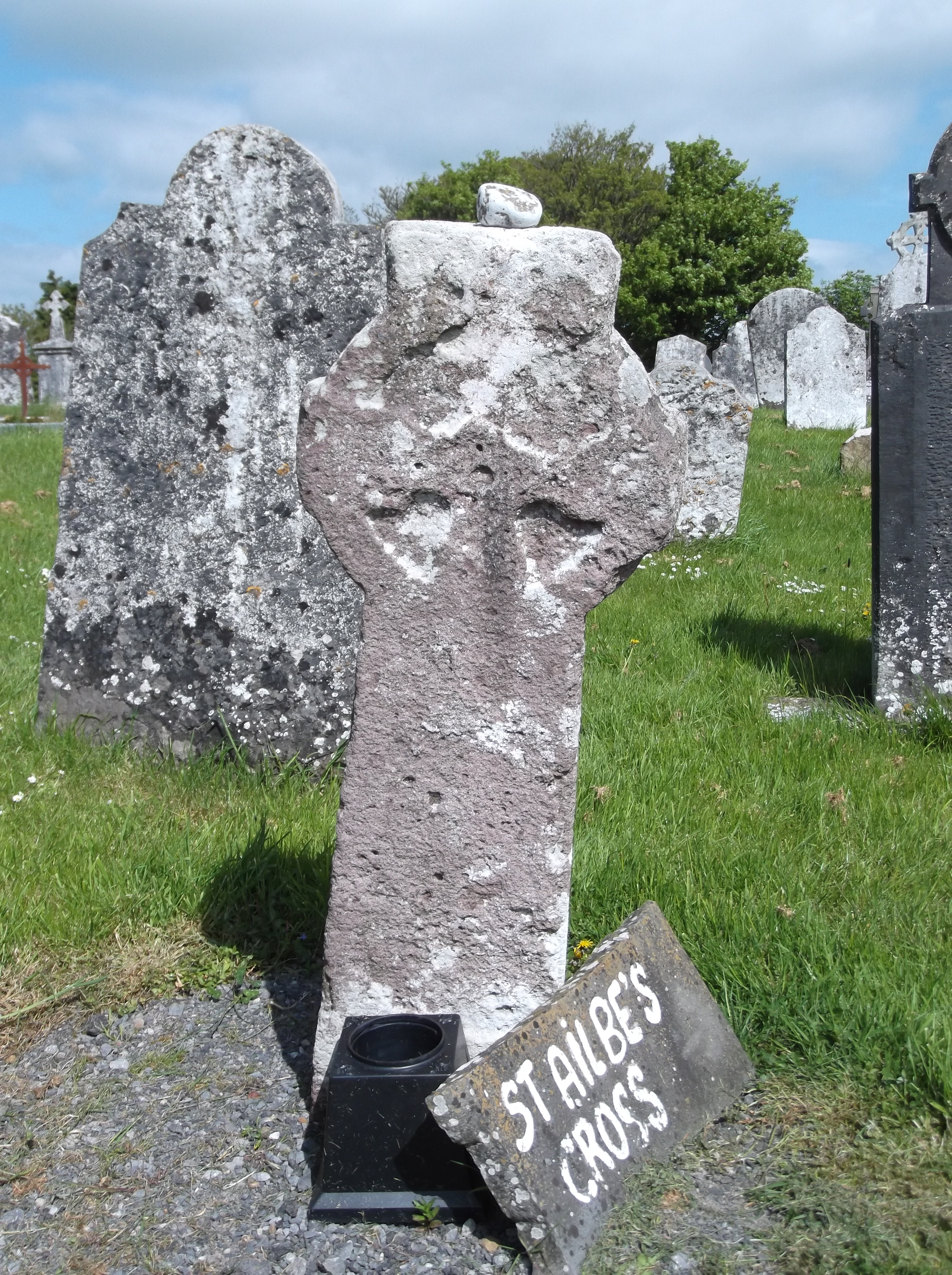
St Ailbe's Cross in Emly.

In Emly, there is a Catholic church dedicated to St Ailbe which dates to the late nineteenth century. An ancient and weathered Celtic cross in its churchyard is known as "St Ailbe's Cross". The early nineteenth-century church of St Ailbe is now used as the village hall. A ninth-century monastic rule, written in Old Irish, bears his name.

Although St Elvis in Wales is now in ruins, there is still a shrine to the parish's namesake at 51°52′12.7″N 5°10′43.2″W, which bears an inscription concerning his name and connection to St David.

== See also ==
- Saint Ailbe of Emly, patron saint archive

== Sources ==
- de Paor, Liam (trans.) (1993). Saint Patrick's World: The Christian Culture of Ireland's Apostolic Age. Dublin: Four Courts Press.
- Gougaud, Louis (1932). Christianity in Celtic Lands.
- Ó Riain, Pádraig (ed. and trans.) (2017). Beatha Ailbhe: The Life of Saint Ailbhe of Cashel and Emly. London: Irish Texts Society.
