= Ciarán of Saigir =

First Irish-born saint

Saint Ciarán of Saigir
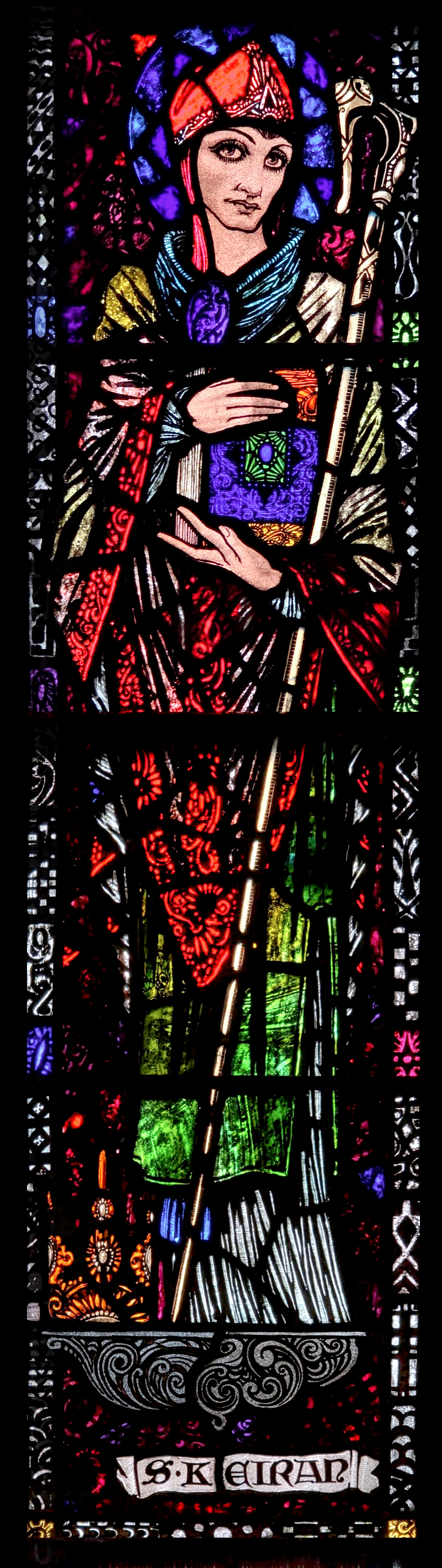
- St. Kieran by Harry Clarke

Bishop of Saighir
- Born: 5th century Cléire, Kingdom of Munster
- Died: c. 530
- Venerated in: Catholic Church; Orthodox Church; Certain Protestant churches
- Canonized: Pre-Congregation
- Major shrine: Saighir
- Succeeded by: Carthage the Elder
- Feast: 5 March
- Patronage: Ossory, Kingdom of Ossory, St. Kieran's College

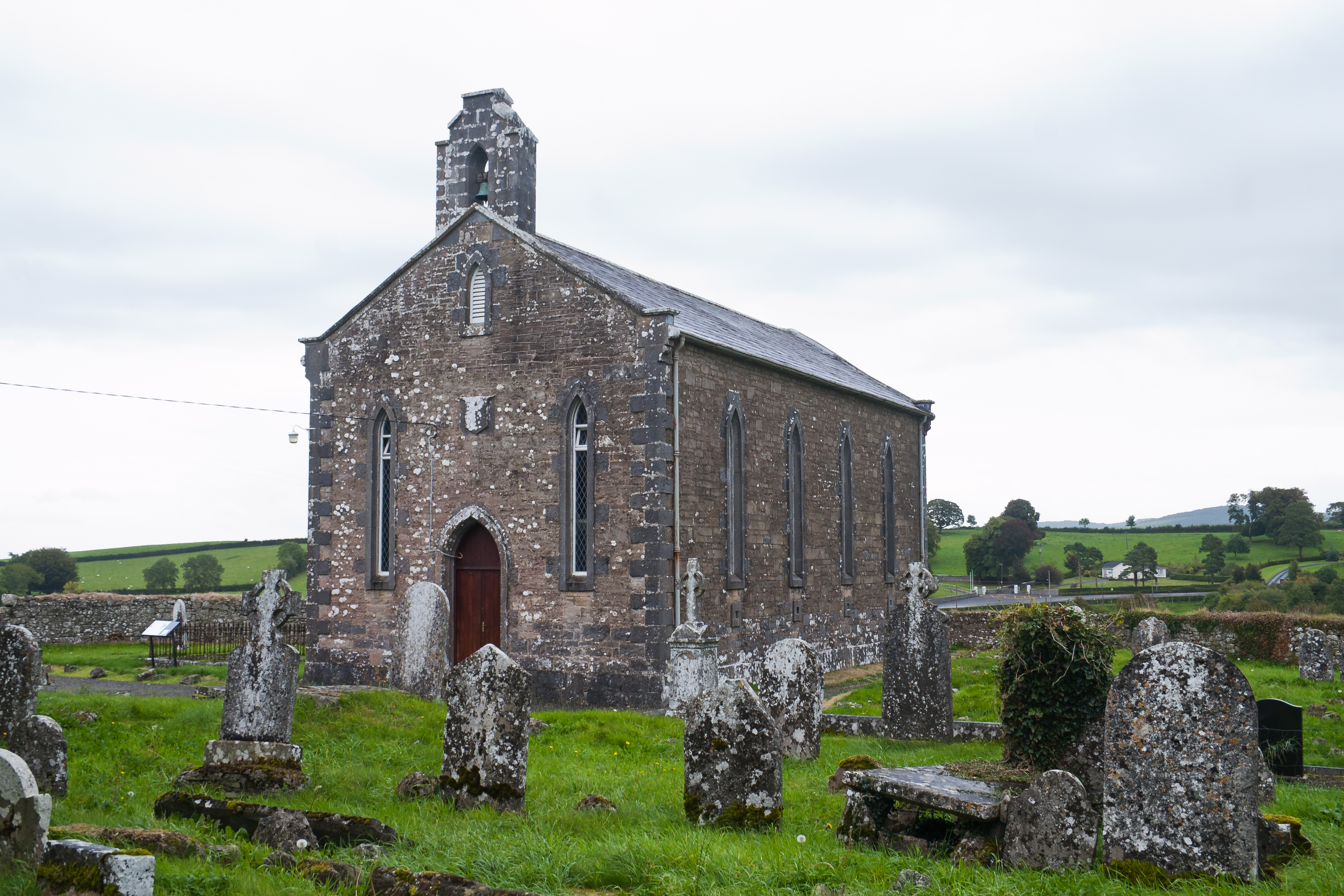
St. Ciarán's Church (CoI)

Ciarán of Saigir (Old Irish pronunciation: [ˈkʲiːa̯ɾaːn … ˈsagʲiɾʲ]; 5th century – c. 530), also known as Ciarán mac Luaigne or Saint Kieran (Welsh: Cieran), was one of the Twelve Apostles of Ireland and is considered the first saint to have been born in Ireland, although the legend that he preceded Saint Patrick is questionable. Ciarán was bishop of Saighir (Seir-Kieran) and remains the patron saint of its successor, the diocese of Ossory.

His feast day is celebrated on 5 March. He is sometimes called Saint Ciarán the Elder (Latin: Kyaranus or Ciaranus Maior) to distinguish him from the other 6th-century Irish Saint Ciarán, who was abbot of Clonmacnoise. He shares the feast date of 5 March with his mother, St. Liadán, and his disciple and episcopal successor, St. Carthach the Elder.

His identity is sometimes equated with that of Saint Piran.

== Sources ==
Various medieval traditions about the saint are recorded in a number of hagiographic works: two Lives in Latin, both of uncertain date, and two Lives in Irish. The shortest Latin Life is preserved in the Codex Salmanticensis, while the longer one is found in the Codex Kilkenniensis. The latter was rendered into Irish and a second Irish Life was produced after the Protestant Reformation. The latter, though the latest of the four, is thought to draw on the oldest traditions when it deals sympathetically with the Osraige. Primarily intended to edify, educate and entertain, it is unclear to what extent they are an accurate representation of events.

== Family background and early career ==
The martyrologies, notably the Félire Óengusso, and medieval Irish genealogies identify Ciarán's father as Lugna (also Laighne), a nobleman of the Dál Birn rulers of Osraige, and his mother as Liadán, of the Corcu Loígde. Before he was conceived Ciarán's mother had a dream that a star fell into her mouth. She related this dream to the druids who were knowledgeable of such things, and they told her that she would bear a son whose fame and virtues would be known as far as the world's end. Cape Clear Island southwest of County Cork is regarded as his birthplace and it is said that a church was built by him on the island.

Ciarán's biography is full of obscurities. It is commonly said, however, that he left Ireland before the arrival of St Patrick. Already a Christian, and of royal Osraige blood, he had determined to study for the Church; hence, he secured an education at Tours and Rome.

== Foundation of Saighir ==
By one account Patrick sent Ciarán to precede him and directed him to build a monastery at the site of a well. When Ciarán asked how he should find this well, Patrick gave him a little bell, that would not ring until he reached the well.

On his return from Rome, he built himself a little cell in the woods of Upper Ossory. He settled as a hermit at Saighir (alternately called Seir Kieran, or just Seir) near to the Slieve Bloom Mountains, but soon disciples were attracted to him and a large monastery grew up round his cell, which became the chosen burial place for the Kings of Osraige. A tradition shared by all four Lives describes Ciarán as a holy man wearing skins, whose first pupils are animals in the forest.

This corresponds to the image of him as a Western John the Baptist, wearing skins and dwelling in the wilderness, seemingly as a forerunner to Saint Patrick as John was to Christ. His mother, Liadan, is said to have gone to Saighir with a group of women who devoted their lives to the service of God and the members of her son's community.

Sier Kieran became the chief church of the Osraighe, a centre for the preaching of the Gospel and a large industrial community noted for its wealth. It was superseded by the later monastic foundation of St Canice at nearby Aghaboe.

== Pre-Patrician Arrival ==
Like the saints Ailbe of Emly, Declán of Ardmore and Abbán, Ciarán is credited with a pre-Patrician career in Munster, though the Lives hardly refer to these putative contemporaries. This tradition may reflect interaction with Christians of south Wales before St Patrick came to Ireland.

Ciarán is said to have met Patrick in Italy and made allegiance to him. Some writers say that when St. Patrick arrived in Ireland, Ciarán was already a bishop, having been ordained while on the continent. It seems more likely, however, that he was one of the twelve men that Patrick, on his arrival, consecrated as helpers. He became the first bishop of Ossory.

There is long-standing academic disagreement in the dating of the life of St. Ciarán of Saighir. Traditional Irish sources (his vitae, the Félire Óengusso, etc.) ascribe his missionary activity as before St Patrick, but assign no dates to his life. If true, he would have likely been born somewhere near the end of the 4th century and evangelised in the 5th, and some writers accept this (Plummer, Hogan, Kenny).

According to W. O'Halloran, the Annals of Inisfallen have Ciarán born at Cape Clear in Cork in 352.

Others such as Baring-Gould, Sharpe, O'Riain, and Sperber push his life forward variously into the 5th and even 6th centuries. Lanigan and Leslie Stephen place him in the 5th century, based on anecdotes that make him a contemporary of Ciarán of Clonmacnoise, Brendan of Birr, and Brendan of Clonfert. Lanigan suggests that Ciarán of Saighir was one of Finnian of Clonard's first students, and indicates that he was likely bishop sometime prior to 544.

== Miracles ==
Legends attribute remarkable miracles to Ciarán. One day when Ciarán was still yet a child he made a beginning of his miracles; for in the air right over him a kite came soaring and, swooping down before his face, lifted a little bird that sat upon her nest. Compassion for the little bird took Ciarán, and he deemed it an ill thing to see it in such plight; thereupon the kite turned back and in front of him deposited the bird half dead, sorely hurt; but Ciarán bade it rise and be whole. The bird arose, and went whole upon its nest again.

One such relates how the Lord Justice of Ireland, Risteárd de Tiúit, went to Athlone, with the intention of sending his brothers to Limerick, Waterford, and Wexford, that he himself might reside in Dublin and Athlone (alternately); but it happened, through the miracles of God, St Peter and St Ciarán, that some of the stones of the castle of Athlone fell upon his head, killing him, his priest and a number of his people.

He is reputed in the Lives as having miraculously performed abortion in a raped nun called Bruinnech. The Catholic News Agency cites Thomas Charles-Edwards, "...[t]hese accounts need to be put in context. In these examples, the saint's intervention is directed towards restoring the honor of the woman concerned. ...The evidence of saints’ lives concerns miracles as conceived by later hagiographers. It is usually bad evidence for what they actually did, better evidence for what later writers could imagine happening." However, Callan's claims are somewhat dubious. They drew criticism from Dr. Paul Byrne, a Dublin-based independent scholar who has lectured in early Irish history at University College Dublin. "There is no credible evidence that any Irish saints were involved in any form of abortion," Byrne said in comments provided to CNA. Maeve Callan suggests that abortion was seen as a lesser sin at the time.

Another story is that he blessed a well so that "it had the taste of wine or honey for everyone who drank it got drunk as well as filled”.

Folklore also relates many charming tales of St Ciarán's influence on wild animals. Tales tell of a fox, badger and wolf who worked with Ciarán and his monks to cut wood and build huts for the brothers. One day the fox stole Ciarán's shoes; upon which Ciarán ordered the badger to retrieve them. The badger found the fox, and bound him from head to tail, returning him to his master; the saint ordered the fox to repent for his sin as a monk would, and to return to his tasks as before.

Scholia in the Martyrology of Oengus states that he foretold of the sanctity of Conall and Fachtna of Rosscarbery. Ciarán's date of death is uncertain but he is thought to have died at an advanced age from natural causes.

== Legacy ==
The ruins of Ciarán's monastery - which were long the burial place of the Kings of Osraige - remain to this day. He is also associated with a monastic site near Errill. Another site exists on the island of Cape Clear, which is said to have been his birthplace and the hermitage of his youth. Church ruins and a well exist here of considerable age. Saint Ciarán is venerated in England, Brittany, Wales, and Scotland, on 5 March. St. Kieran's College (est. 1782) is the oldest Roman Catholic secondary school in Ireland, and is named for the saint.

He is sometimes listed as one of the Twelve Apostles of Ireland, although in the Martyrology of Oengus, Ciarán of Saighir is not enumerated as such, and his association with the students of St. Finnian may be a persistent confusion.

St. Ciarán of Saigir was the subject of New Hagiography's 5 March 2018 release of "Mr. Fox Felt Really Bad"; a reference to the stealing of the saint's leather shoe by one of his first vulpine monastic recruits.

He is traditionally identified with the Saint Piran who is venerated in Cornwall, Wales, and Brittany. although Pádraig Ó Riain considers this "groundless".

Some have suggested that the saint name of Ciaran is a Christianized version of the earlier Gaulish-Celtic god of Cernunnos. The Celtic god has many similar traits mostly to Ciaran of Saighir, both were known as tamers of wild animals and heavily connected to the wild and forests. Ciaran spent his early years as a Christian hermit in forests surrounded by the wild animals of the woods, who were said to have been his first pupils. The animals helped Ciaran construct his first cell in the woods, as a result, the saint always remembered them all as being the first brother monks of his little monastery.

== See also ==
- Carthage the Elder
- Dál Birn
- Diocese of Ossory
- Early Irish Christianity
- History of Roman Catholicism in Ireland
- Kingdom of Ossory
- Saint Cera
- Seir Kieran GAA
