= Whitchurch, Pembrokeshire =

Village and parish in Pembrokeshire, Wales

Coordinates: 51.88°N 5.2°W

Whitchurch: Welsh: Tregroes
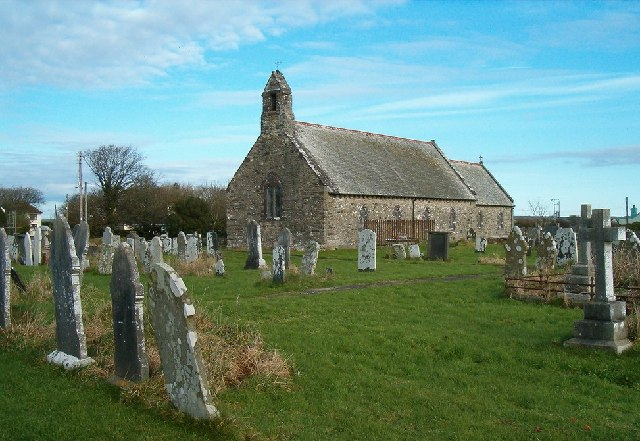
- St David's Church

- Location within Pembrokeshire
- OS grid reference: SM799255
- Community: Solva
- Principal area: Pembrokeshire
- Country: Wales
- Sovereign state: United Kingdom
- Police: Dyfed-Powys
- Fire: Mid and West Wales
- Ambulance: Welsh
- UK Parliament: Mid and South Pembrokeshire

Whitchurch (Welsh: Tregroes, lit. "Town of the Cross") is a small village and parish (Plwy'r Groes, lit. "Parish of the Cross") in north-western Pembrokeshire, West Wales.

== Description ==
The settlement of Whitchurch is 1.2 mi (1.9 km) from the coast and 3 mi (4.8 km) east of St David's, and includes the parish church (also dedicated to Saint David) and a few houses. The largest settlement in the parish, which covers 3,138 acres (1,270 ha), is Solva, whose own church is dedicated to St Aidan. The parishes of Whitchurch and St Elvis make up the community of Solva.

== History ==
By the churchyard gate is a standing stone called Maen Dewi, believed to be the lower part of a large Celtic cross.

Whitchurch was a chapelry in the parish of St David's before becoming a parish in its own right. It is marked on a 1578 parish map held by the British Library. A later, but pre-1850 parish map shows the extensive parish including several smaller settlements, including the village of Solva, in which there were numerous chapels. Much of the land was still unenclosed in the 19th century.

Whitchurch was in the ancient hundred of Dewisland and in the 1830s had a population of 1,028. The population varied from 599 in 1801 to a maximum of 1,252 in 1851, then had fallen to 800 by 1961.

Whitchurch and Solva share a War Memorial, on which the names of 50 parishioners are listed as having lost their lives in two world wars. RAF St Davids was established in 1943, and operated until the 1990s.

There is an unusually large number of listed buildings for such a rural area, many with mediaeval origins, including the Grade II listed parish church, mills, bridges and farm buildings.

== Notable people ==
The farm of Caerforiog, Whitchurch, is claimed as the birthplace of Adam Houghton (or Hoton), a 14th-century Lord Chancellor of England and Bishop of St Davids. In 1856, a small building survived at Caerforiog with an ogee-headed doorway, possibly dating from the 14th century.

Caleb Rees (1883–1970), was born at "Esgairordd", in Whitchurch, Pembrokeshire; he was a Welsh school inspector for over forty years and a writer on educational and ecclesiastical topics.
