= St Elvis, Pembrokeshire =

Parish in Pembrokeshire, Wales

St Elvis
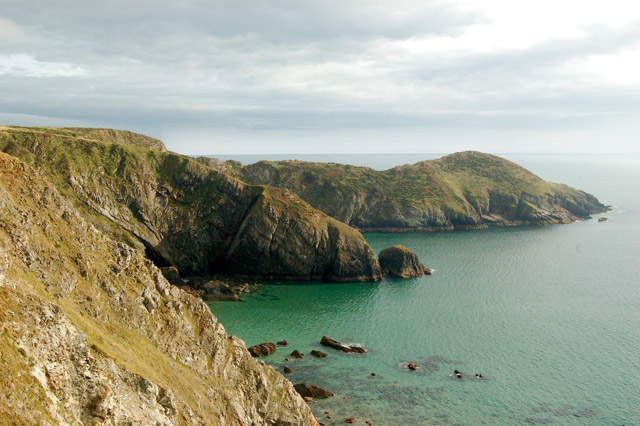
- The Dinas Fawr headlands beside the site of St Elvis

- Location within Pembrokeshire
- OS grid reference: SM811240
- Principal area: Pembrokeshire
- Country: Wales
- Sovereign state: United Kingdom
- Post town: HAVERFORDWEST
- Postcode district: SA62
- Police: Dyfed-Powys
- Fire: Mid and West Wales
- Ambulance: Welsh

St Elvis (Welsh: Llaneilfyw, [ɬanəilvəu]) is a parish in Pembrokeshire, Wales, about 4 miles (6 km) east of St David's. At 200 acres (81 ha) it is one of the smallest parishes in Wales but its rector was previously the superior of the vicar of the church at Solva (today dependent upon nearby Whitchurch instead). The parish of Whitchurch and St Elvis together form the community of Solva.

== Name ==
The name is a Latinized form of the Welsh saint Eilfyw, also well known by his Gaelic name Ailbe. Former forms of the name include Llanelvewe and Llanailfyw. According to Rhyddferch's 11th-century Life of Saint David, Elvis baptized Saint David in AD 454 at Porth Clais in Dyfed. (Note, however, that this dating seems unlikely.)

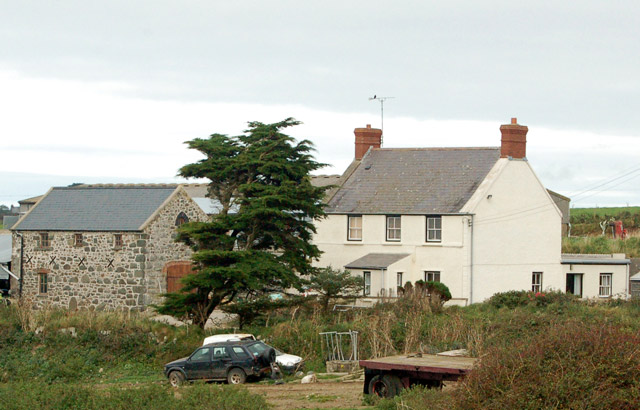
St Elvis farm

== History ==
A 5000-year-old cromlech—including two early British tombs—lies nearby, although they were damaged by a tenant farmer in the 19th century who removed two of the stones.

GENUKI notes church and chapel records dating from the 19th century, with two farms. There is still a St Elvis farm (Vagwr Eilw) and the ruins of the earlier monastery and church, covered with blackthorn. St Elvis's Well is also nearby and continued to produce 360 gallons an hour amid the 1976 drought.

In 2000 Terry Breverton, a lecturer at Cardiff University, while promoting his book, suggested that the rock star Elvis Presley's ancestral roots came from the Celtic prehistoric site of Preseli Hills in Pembrokeshire and may have had links to a chapel at St Elvis.

== Religious sites ==
There is a shrine to St Elvis, located at 51°52′12.7″N 5°10′43.2″W.
