= John P. Devine (politician) =

American lawyer

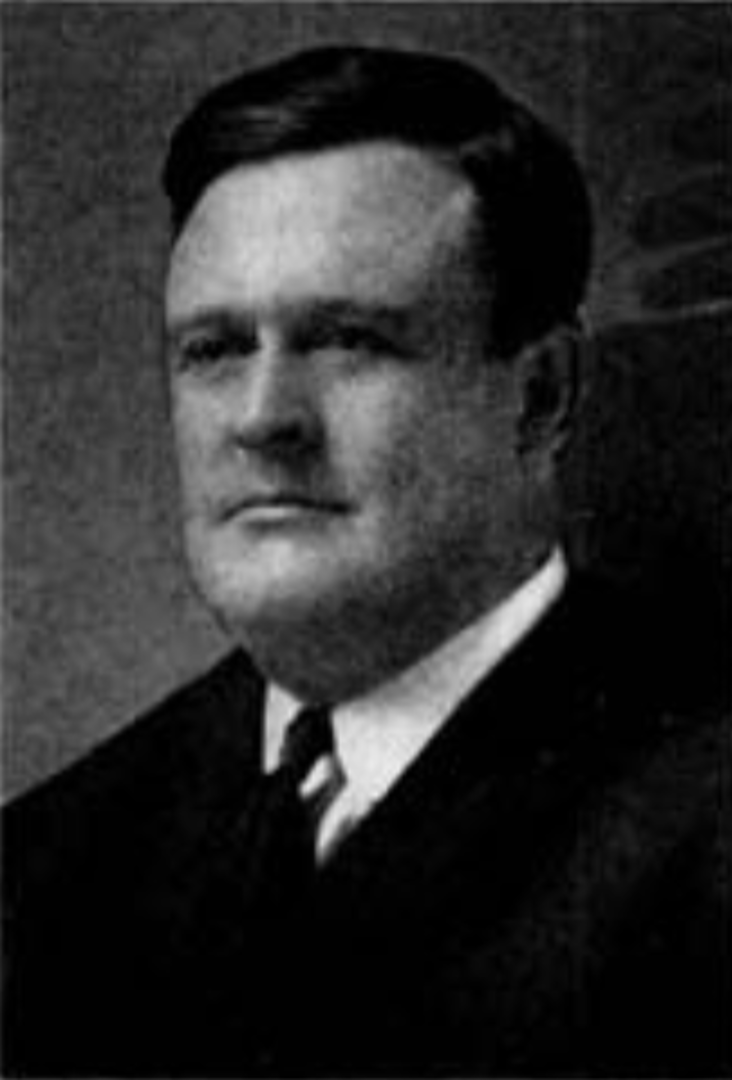
- Devine in 1925 as a State Representative

51st Speaker of the Illinois House of Representatives
- In office January 9, 1935 – January 6, 1937
- Preceded by: Arthur Roe
- Succeeded by: Louie E. Lewis

Personal details
- Born: January 22, 1878 Harmon, Illinois
- Died: October 21, 1955 (aged 77) Dixon, Illinois
- Party: Democratic
- Education: Dixon College
- Occupation: Lawyer, politician

John P. Devine (January 22, 1878 – October 21, 1955) was an American politician.

== Biography ==
Born in Harmon, Illinois, Devine received his law degree from Dixon College and then practiced law in Dixon, Illinois. He was a Democrat. He served in the Illinois House of Representatives from 1913 to 1935 and was Speaker of the Illinois House of Representatives in 1935. He then returned to Dixon, Illinois to practice law. Devine was a referee for the United States District Court for the Northern District of Illinois. He died in 1955 in Dixon, Illinois.
