= Kealy =

- Language: English

Origin
- Language: Irish
- Derivation: Ó Caollaidhe or Ó Caollaí
- Meaning: slim/slender one
- Region of origin: Ireland

Kealy is a surname of Irish origin, anglicised from the Irish-language: Ó Caollaidhe or Ó Caollaí. The O'Kealys were a branch of the Dál Birn lineage and associated with the Kingdom of Osraige. The O'Kealys were rulers of Uí Bearchon in County Kilkenny and Críoch Uí mBuidhe in County Laois, the later of which they were expelled from during the Laois-Offaly Plantation in the mid 16th century. The surname Kealy is most common in County Kilkenny.

Notable people with the surname include:

- Andrew P. Kealy (1861–1917), American politician
- Brendan Kealy (born 1986), Irish Gaelic footballer
- David Kealy (born 1965), Irish footballer
- Emma Kealy (born 1977), Australian politician
- John W. Kealy (1902–1970), New Zealand politician and lawyer
- Jordan Kealy, Canadian politician
- Mike Kealy (1945–1979), British Army officer serving in the Special Air Service
- Thomas J. Kealy (1927–2012), American chemist, co-discoverer of ferrocene
- Alex Kealy, Stand-up comedian
