= St. Kieran's Church =

Medieval church in County Laois, Ireland

- Errill Church
- Séipéal Naomh Chiaráin
- Location within Ireland
- 52.852899°N 7.672005°W
- Location: Errill, County Laois
- Country: Ireland
- Denomination: Catholic Church (Pre-Reformation)

History
- Status: In ruins
- Founded: 6th century AD
- Founder: Saint Ciarán of Saigir

Architecture
- Heritage designation: National Monument
- Years built: Middle Ages

Specifications
- Length: 16.9 metres (18.5 yd)
- Width: 8.8 metres (9.6 yd)

Administration
- Diocese: Ossory

National monument of Ireland
- Official name: Errill
- Reference no.: 113

St. Kieran's Church is a medieval church and National Monument located in Errill, County Laois, Ireland.

== Location ==
St Kieran's Church is located to the south of Errill village, about 5 km (3½ miles) to the west of Rathdowney, on the south bank of the Errill River (a tributary of the River Erkina, which itself feeds into the Nore).

== History ==
The site at Errill dates back to the early Christian period, when a monastery was founded by Saint Ciarán of Saigir (died ca. AD 530). A holy tree and holy well associated with Kieran stand nearby. Only grass-covered wall footing remains of the monastery. The church was built later, in the medieval period. A wayside cross was constructed in the 17th century.

== The building ==
The ruins consist of upstanding walls, measuring 16.9 m x 8.8 m. A doorway and rounded window remains in the south wall. Another window survives also. Masonry has been reused as gravemarkers in the graveyard.
