= Harmon, Illinois =

Village in Lee County, Illinois, US

Harmon
- Village
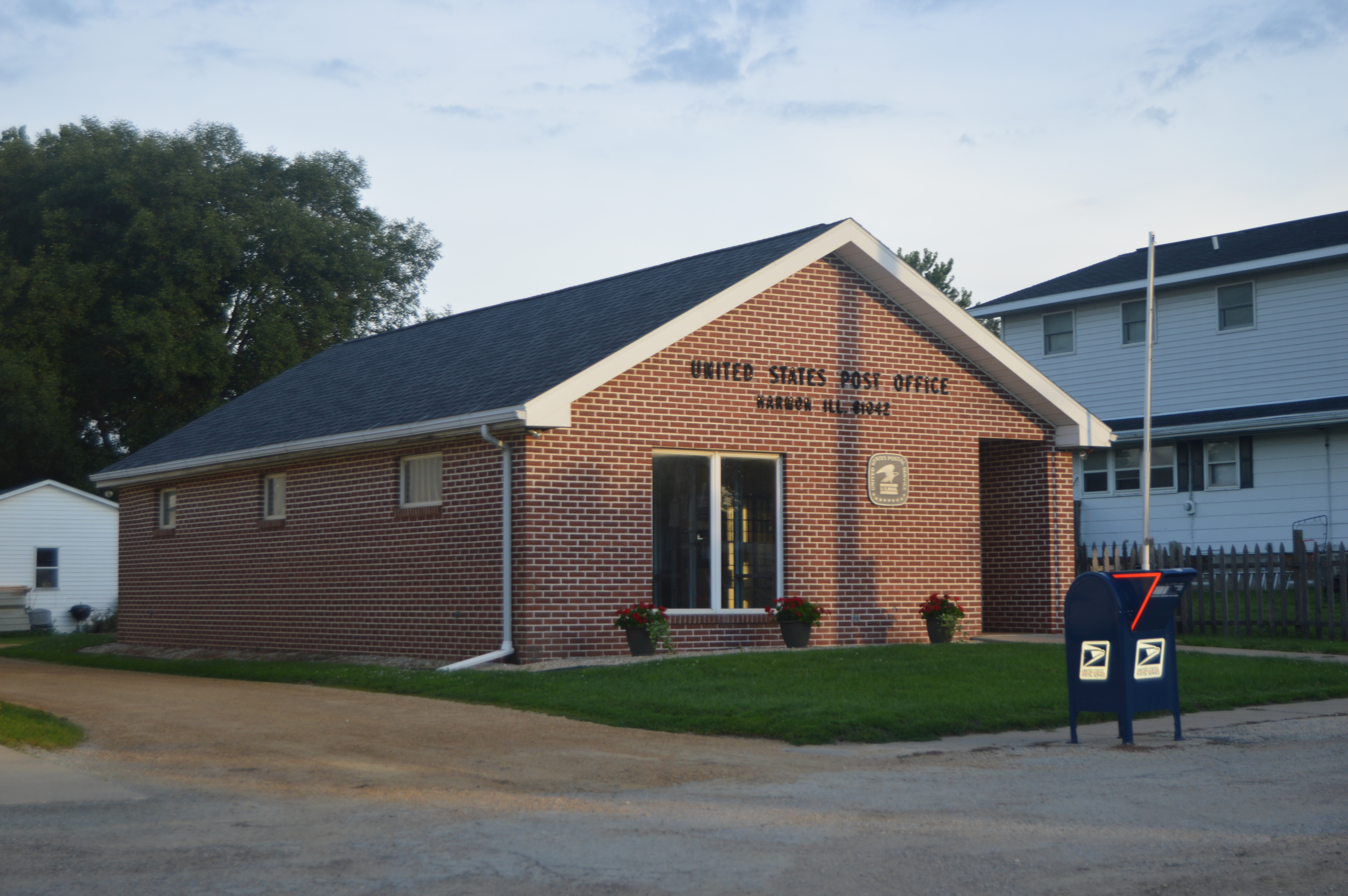
- Village post office

- Location of Harmon in Lee County, Illinois.
- Coordinates: 41°43′20″N 89°33′16″W
- Country: United States
- State: Illinois
- County: Lee

Area
  - Total: 0.27 sq mi (0.69 km^{2})
  - Land: 0.27 sq mi (0.69 km^{2})
  - Water: 0 sq mi (0.00 km^{2})
- Elevation: 679 ft (207 m)

Population (2020)
  - Total: 111
  - Density: 419.7/sq mi (162.04/km^{2})
- Time zone: UTC-6 (CST)
  - Summer (DST): UTC-5 (CDT)
- ZIP code: 61042
- Area codes: 815 & 779
- FIPS code: 17-32967
- GNIS feature ID: 2398249

Harmon is a village in Lee County, Illinois, United States. As of the 2020 census, Harmon had a population of 111.

== Geography ==
Harmon is located at 41°43′14″N 89°33′19″W (41.720660, -89.555298).

According to the 2021 census gazetteer files, Harmon has a total area of 0.15 square miles (0.39 km^{2}), all land.

== Demographics ==
Historical population
Census	Pop.	Note	%±
1880	238		—
1890	132		−44.5%
1910	162		—
1920	202		24.7%
1930	209		3.5%
1940	201		−3.8%
1950	208		3.5%
1960	214		2.9%
1970	205		−4.2%
1980	193		−5.9%
1990	186		−3.6%
2000	149		−19.9%
2010	120		−19.5%
2020	111		−7.5%
U.S. Decennial Census

As of the 2020 census there were 111 people, 60 households, and 32 families residing in the village. The population density was 744.97 inhabitants per square mile (287.63/km^{2}). There were 51 housing units at an average density of 342.28 per square mile (132.16/km^{2}). The racial makeup of the village was 91.89% White, 0.00% African American, 0.00% Native American, 0.00% Asian, 0.00% Pacific Islander, 0.00% from other races, and 8.11% from two or more races. Hispanic or Latino of any race were 3.60% of the population.

There were 60 households, out of which 25.0% had children under the age of 18 living with them, 36.67% were married couples living together, 13.33% had a female householder with no husband present, and 46.67% were non-families. 20.00% of all households were made up of individuals, and 13.33% had someone living alone who was 65 years of age or older. The average household size was 3.44 and the average family size was 2.43.

The village's age distribution consisted of 21.9% under the age of 18, 15.1% from 18 to 24, 19.9% from 25 to 44, 30.2% from 45 to 64, and 13.0% who were 65 years of age or older. The median age was 39.8 years. For every 100 females, there were 131.7 males. For every 100 females age 18 and over, there were 119.2 males.

The median income for a household in the village was $32,500, and the median income for a family was $53,750. Males had a median income of $21,250 versus $21,111 for females. The per capita income for the village was $17,440. About 18.8% of families and 32.9% of the population were below the poverty line, including 15.6% of those under age 18 and 10.5% of those age 65 or over.

== Education ==
It is in the Amboy Community Unit School District 272.

== Notable people ==
- Hubert D. Considine, Illinois state representative and businessman, was born in Harmon.
- John P. Devine, lawyer and Speaker of the Illinois House of Representatives, was born in Harmon.
