= Giolla na Naomh Mac Aodhagáin =

Irish historian (died c. 1443)

Giolla na Naomh Mac Aodhagáin, Irish scribe and historian, died c. 1443.

A member of the Mac Aodhagáin family of bards, Giolla na Naomh was a professor of Irish in Ormond; he may have acted in a legal capacity for the Earl of Ormond.

He was responsible for the compilation of the Fragmentary Annals of Ireland, which he wrote on a vellum manuscript. In 1643, they were copied for Rev. John Lynch of Galway by Dubhaltach Mac Fhirbhisigh. The original manuscript is now lost but a copy survives of Mac Fhirbhisigh's text. The manuscript (MS. 7, c. n. 17) is incomplete and includes five fragments of annals beginning in 573 and ending in 914.

In 1309, a direct ancestor with the same name, Giolla na Naomh Mac Aodhagáin ollav of Connacht in Law and a universal master equally skilled in all arts, was killed in the retinue of Aedh mac Eoghain Ó Conchobair king of Connacht by the Clan Murtagh O'Conor. The Mac Aodhagáin family moved south from Connacht into Ormond after his death.
