= Fragmentary Annals of Ireland =

Medieval-written historical work

The Fragmentary Annals of Ireland or Three Fragments are a Middle Irish combination of chronicles from various Irish annals and narrative history. They were compiled in the kingdom of Osraige, probably in the lifetime of Donnchad mac Gilla Pátraic (died 1039), king of Osraige and king of Leinster. A major narrative within the text is the so-called "Osraige Chronicle" (as proposed by Radner) which greatly focuses on the exploits of the ninth century king of Osraige, Cerball mac Dúnlainge, who was the paternal ancestor of the medieval Mac Giolla Phádraig family.

The Fragmentary Annals were copied in 1643 for the Rev. John Lynch by Dubhaltach Mac Fhirbhisigh from a lost 15th-century vellum manuscript, which belonged to Giolla na Naomh Mac Aodhagáin (Nehemias MacEgan). Mac Aodhagáin, who died around 1443, was a professor of Irish Brehon Law in Ormond. The sole surviving manuscript of the Fragmentary Annals, which is currently held by the Royal Library of Belgium in Brussels, is not in Mac Fhirbhisigh's hand, but in that of an anonymous scribe, who made a fair copy of Mac Fhirbhisigh's text, adding some marginal comments of his own and an index. The manuscript (MS. 7, c. n. 17) is incomplete and includes five fragments of annals beginning in 573 and ending in 914. What has survived joins the synopsis of the hypothetical Chronicle of Ireland.

Little is known of the lost exemplar from which Mac Fhirbhisigh worked. He appears to have modernized the orthography of the original text as he copied it. There are lacunae in places where the exemplar could no longer be read due to its poor condition. Mac Fhirbhisigh's copyist added dates, which he took from the Annals of the Four Masters without troubling to confirm their accuracy or correct them where they were clearly in error.

The first fragment relates mainly to the Northern Uí Néill and may have been compiled in Ulster, but the remaining fragments were evidently compiled in Osraige (Ossory), a kingdom which corresponded approximately to the later County Kilkenny and western County Laois. The original compiler evidently drew upon a variety of sources, some of which (e.g. annals) were probably more accurate and trustworthy than others (e.g. long bardic works). The fragments combine cold annalistic records with romantic tales and extravagant flights of fancy in a manner that is unique among the Irish annals.

Two modern editions of the Fragmentary Annals have been published:

- John O'Donovan (editor & translator) Annals of Ireland: three fragments. (Dublin 1860)
- Joan N. Radner (editor & translator) Fragmentary annals of Ireland (Dublin 1978)

== See also ==
- Irish annals
- Chronicle of Ireland
