= Hubert D. Considine =

American politician and businessman

Hubert Dennis Considine (July 1, 1919–September 23, 1974) was an American politician and businessman.

Considine was born in Harmon, Illinois. He went to the Harmon public schools and graduated from St. Mary's High School in Sterling, Illinois. Considine served as a pilot in the United States Army Air Forces, during World War II, and was commissioned a first lieutenant. Considine was involved with the automobile and farm implement business. He lived in Dixon, Illinois with his wife and family. Considine served in the Illinois House of Representatives from 1947 to 1957 and was a Democrat. Considine died at the People's Hospital La Salle-Peru, Illinois.
