= Cellach mac Fáelchair =

- King of Osraige
- Predecessor: Ailill mac Fáeláin
- Successor: Forbasach mac Ailella
- Died: 735
- Issue: Dúngal mac Cellaig
- House: Dál Birn
- Father: Fáelchar Ua Máele Ódrain

Cellach mac Fáelchair (died 735) or Cellach Raigni was a King of Osraige in modern County Kilkenny. He was the son of Fáelchar Ua Máele Ódrain (died 693), a previous king.

The dynasty that ruled over Osraige in the early Christian period was known as the Dál Birn. His year of accession is unknown, the last king of Osraige to be mentioned in the annals prior to Cellach was Cú Cherca mac Fáeláin (died 712), however the Book of Leinster king lists name two other kings between Cú Cherca and Cellach.

At this time Osraige was part of the Kingdom of Munster and in the 8th century was often involved in conflicts with the men of Leinster, the Laigin. Cellach's father had been slain fighting versus Leinster. In 735 the men of Munster led by their king, Cathal mac Finguine (died 742) fought the Battle of Belach Éile with the men of Leinster. Many Munstermen were slain and among them was Cellach. The location of the battle makes it probable that Cellach of the Osraige was the aggressor and was taking advantage of the rivalry of the Uí Dúnlainge and the Uí Cheinnselaig branches of the Laigin at this time.

His son Dúngal mac Cellaig (died 772) was also King of Osraige but the kingship became dominated by a different line.
