= Cerball mac Dúnlainge =

King of Osraige
- Reign: 842–888
- Predecessor: Dúngal mac Fergaile
- Successor: Riagan mac Dúnlainge
- Died: 888 AD
- Burial: Saighir, County Offaly
- Consort: Maelfelbha, daughter of high king Máel Sechnaill mac Máele Ruanaid
- Issue: Diarmait; Cellach; Bráenán; Rafarta; Gormlaith; Dunghal; Eithne; Cuilde; Mór; Fridgerd
- House: Dál Birn
- Father: Dúngal mac Fergaile

Cerball mac Dúnlainge (patronymic sometimes spelled Dúngaile, Irish: [ˈcaɾˠuːl̪ˠ mˠək ˈd̪ˠuːn̪ˠl̪ˠəɲə]) (died 888) was king of Ossory in south-east Ireland. The kingdom of Ossory (Osraige) occupied roughly the area of modern County Kilkenny and western County Laois and lay between the larger provincial kingdoms of Munster and Leinster.

Cerball came to prominence after the death of Fedelmid mac Crimthainn, King of Munster, in 847. Ossory had been subject for a period to the Eóganachta kings of Munster, but Feidlimid was succeeded by a series of weak kings who had to contend with Viking incursions on the coasts of Munster. As a result, Cerball was in a strong position and is said to have been the second most powerful king in Ireland in his later years. Upon his death, he was succeeded by his brother Riagan mac Dúnlainge.

Kjarvalr Írakonungr (Old Norse: [ˈkjɑrˌwɑlz̠ ˈiːrɑˌkonoŋɡz̠]; Modern Icelandic: Kjarvalur Írakonungur [ˈcʰarˌvaːlʏr ˈiːraˌkʰɔːnuŋkʏr̥]), a figure in the Norse sagas who appears as an ancestor of many prominent Icelandic families, is identified with Cerball.

== Nature of the sources ==
A large body of contemporary and near-contemporary material on early medieval Ireland has survived. From the titles of works mentioned in these sources, it is clear that a great deal of additional material has now been lost. The surviving materials usually exist in the form of much later copies, and it is only from comparison of the various texts that the original documents can be reconstructed.

The Irish annals which document the ninth century are ultimately derived from the now-lost Chronicle of Ireland which was then being compiled in the midlands of Ireland. All annals include material derived from other sources, or added at a later date. None are complete, although the Annals of Ulster and the Annals of Inisfallen cover Cerball's lifetime. The Annals of Clonmacnoise survive only in an eccentric 17th-century English translation, and the Annals of Tigernach for this period are lost, although Dubhaltach Mac Fhirbhisigh's abbreviated copy known as the Chronicon Scotorum supplies much of the missing material. The Annals of the Four Masters are late, and include some material of doubtful origin. While the annals provide a considerable amount of information, they are generally terse, and most focus their attention on the doings of the Uí Néill, sometimes to the extent of omitting inconvenient events.

A source which concentrates on Cerball's career is the Fragmentary Annals of Ireland, so called because only fragments remain of a seemingly longer work, these again copied by Mac Fhirbhisigh in the 17th century from a 15th-century manuscript. The fragment which deals with Cerball's lifetime ends in the early 870s, so that the last fifteen years of his life are missing. Joan Radner, editor and translator of the modern edition of the Fragmentary Annals, argues that these were compiled at the court of Cerball's great-great-grandson Donnchad mac Gilla Pátraic. Although called annals, these are closer to narrative history and are derived from a number of sources. The basic framework is from the Chronicle of Ireland, but to this has been added a variety of material whose source is unknown, perhaps including early sagas, which concerns Cerball. The Fragmentary Annals were intended to magnify Cerball's achievements, and to present his dealings with Vikings and Norse–Gaels in a favourable light.

If the various annals are partisan, the remaining sources which concern Cerball are notably unreliable. Perhaps inspired by the Fragmentary Annals, which offer some positive views of Vikings and may have been popular in the Norse-Gael Dublin of the 11th century, many Icelandic genealogies include Cerball—Kjarvalr Írakonungr—as an ancestor. Lastly, The Prophecy of Berchán, an 11th-century verse history of kings in Ireland and Scotland presented as a prophecy, may include Cerball.

A very large number of genealogies exist, along with geographical and legal texts. Of these last, the Frithfolad Muman, a document purporting to set out the obligations of the Kings of Munster to their allies, clients, and subjects is of interest as it sheds light on the position of Osraige within the provincial kingship of Munster.

== Cerball's Ireland ==
Ireland circa 900

A memory of the kingdom of Osraige survives today in the name and boundaries of the Roman Catholic Diocese of Ossory. The earliest recorded seat of the bishops was at Saighir, later moved to Aghaboe, and this appears to have been the principal church of the kingdom by the eighth century when the life of Saint Cainnech of Aghaboe was composed. The name Osraige—the Deer people—is among the oldest group of Irish tribal names. Although genealogists in the Early Christian period explained such names by recourse to eponymous ancestors, the names are likely those of totemic animals or tribal deities.

Osraige was only one túath among 150 in Ireland. The average túath was small, perhaps 500 square kilometres in area with a population of some three to four thousand. Osraige was atypical, much larger than this, covering perhaps 2000 square kilometres astride the River Barrow in the modern counties of Kilkenny, Laois, and Offaly. In principle, each tuath had its own king and court and bishop, but political power generally rested with the provincial over-kings.

At the time of Cerball's birth Osraige lay within the province and kingdom of Munster, ruled by the Eóganachta from the royal centre of Cashel. Osraige lay at the extreme eastern edge of Munster bordering the neighbouring province of Leinster. For a period in the seventh century, most of southern Osraige was ruled by the Corcu Loígde, rulers of Munster before the coming of the Eóganachta. The Frithfolad Muman text states that the Osraige had once been kings of Munster and makes it clear that they were a privileged and powerful group, but no longer a major force, "the respectable has-beens of Munster politics".

The period of Cerball's life covered much of the first Viking Age, and he is notably mentioned in later Nordic sources. The Icelandic Landnámabók describes Cearbhall (Kjarvalur) as ruler of Dublin and Earl of Orkney and opens with a list of the most prominent rulers in Viking-age Europe, listing this Ossorian king alongside other well-known rulers of that era, specifically Popes Adrian II and John VIII; Byzantine Emperors Leo VI the Wise and his brother Alexander; Harald Fairhair, king of Norway; Eric Anundsson and his son Björn Eriksson rulers of Sweden; Gorm the Old, king of Denmark; and Alfred the Great, king of England. While several kingdoms in Britain – East Anglia, Fortriu, Mercia, and Northumbria – would collapse under the shock of Viking attacks, their impact in Ireland was very much less immediate. In the first half of the ninth century, raiders appear to have come in small groups, increasing in size until larger forces appear, such as that led by the shadowy Turgéis (Turgesius) in the 840s, and those led by Amlaíb and Ímar from the 850s onwards. Vikings would be both enemies and allies for Cerball and other Irish kings. In the long run, the creation of Norse–Gaelic towns by Vikings operating as traders rather than raiders would change the Irish political landscape, but the results of this were seen in the tenth and eleventh centuries rather than the ninth.

=== Máel Sechnaill and the Danes ===
Cerball succeeded his father Dúnlang (or Dúngal) mac Fergaile as king of Osraige in 842. At this time the High King of Ireland was Máel Sechnaill mac Máele Ruanaid who was married to Cerball's sister Land. Cerball in turn was married to a daughter of Máel Sechnaill.

The first report of Cerball is in 846, when Vikings attacked into northern Osraige, destroying a church at Coolcashin (near Galmoy), and plundering an unidentified settlement at Cúl Maine. Here the raiders were besieged for a fortnight by Cerball's army and lost heavily. The following year Cerball defeated an attack by Vikings from the Irish midlands, perhaps from Dublin, led by one Hákon. This battle is said by some sources to have taken place at Carn Brammit, a site which can no longer be identified.

The late Annals of the Four Masters record an invasion of Osraige in 848 by the Uí Ceinnselaig of southern Leinster, led by their king Echtigern mac Guaire. Cerball played a part in Echtgern's removal in 853. The Annals of Ulster report that Echtigern was killed "deceitfully" by Cerball and one Bruatur of Áed, and that Bruatur was killed by his own household a week later.

In 854, the Fragmentary Annals say that Cerball was sent into Munster by his brother-in-law to collect tribute and hostages.

In 855, he is said to have slaughtered a Viking force under a certain Rodolb. In the aftermath of the battle Cerball was captured by other Vikings, but succeeded in escaping. Shortly afterwards Cerball aided a force of Danes led by a chief named Horm in their war with the Norwegians. The Danes may well have settled at what is now Waterford. The Munstermen asked Cerball's help against the Norse, and Cerball with the men of Osraige, Horm's Danes and some of the men of Munster inflicted a heavy defeat on the Norse. His ally Horm was killed raiding in Wales by Rhodri the Great.

The men from two fleets of Norsemen came into Cerball son of Dúnlang's territory for plunder. When messengers came to tell that to Cerball, he was drunk. The noblemen of Osraige were saying to him kindly and calmly, to strengthen him: 'What the Norwegians are doing now, that is, destroying the whole country, is no reason for a man in Osraige to be drunk. But may God protect you all the same, and may you win victory and triumph over your enemies as you often have done, and as you still shall. Shake off your drunkenness now, for drunkenness is the enemy of valor.'

When Cerball heard that, his drunkenness left him and he seized his arms. A third of the night had passed at that time. This is how Cerball came out of his chamber: with a huge royal candle before him, and the light of that candle shone far in every direction. Great terror seized the Norwegians, and they fled to the nearby mountains and to the woods. Those who stayed behind out of valor, moreover, were all killed.

When daybreak came the next morning, Cerball attacked all of them with his troops, and he did not give up after they had been slaughtered until they had been routed, and they had scattered in all directions. Cerball himself fought hard in this battle, and the amount he had drunk the night before hampered him greatly, and he vomited much, and that gave him immense strength; and he urged his people loudly and harshly against the Norwegians, and more than half of the army was killed there, and those who escaped fled to their ships. This defeat took place at Achad mic Erclaige. Cerball turned back afterwards with triumph and great spoils.

— Fragmentary Annals of Ireland, FA277

== Amlaíb and Ímar ==
Cerball next appears to have allied himself with two Norse or Norse-Gael "kings", Amlaíb Conung, "son of the king of Lochlann", and Ímar, called "king of the Norsemen of all Ireland and Britain" at his death in 873. Ímar is sometimes assumed to be the same person as Ivar the Boneless and Amlaíb to be Olaf the White, respectively son of the legendary Danish Viking Ragnar Lodbrok and Olaf Geirstad-Alf of Vestfold descendant of the Yngling dynasty of Norway. These allies were not sufficiently strong to prevent Máel Sechnaill from taking hostages and tribute from Cerball in 858, but Cerball and Ímar campaigned in Leinster that year, and also against the Norse-Gaels in Munster. The following year, together with Amlaíb Conung, they raided Máel Sechnaill's lands in Mide, but soon afterwards Cerball was compelled to submit again to Máel Sechnaill.

In 860 Cerball defeated a force of Norse who were raiding in Osraige, and later in the year he joined Máel Sechnaill on campaign against Áed Finnliath in the north of Ireland.

=== Áed and Flann ===
Máel Sechnaill died in 862 to be succeeded by Áed Finnliath, who married his widow, Cerball's sister Land. Also in 862, Cerball is reported to have defeated a Norwegian fleet under one Rodolb, although it is not clear that this is the same Rodolb who was defeated in 855. In 864 the Fragmentary Annals of Ireland report that the men of Leinster and their Norse allies raided Osraige in revenge for Cerball's raid, and that Eóganachta of Munster took advantage of this to attack him, so that Cerball raided both his neighbours and caused much destruction. The same year he is said to have attacked the neighbouring Déisi.

In 870 Áed Finnliath brought a large army to Leinster and Cerball accompanied him. The army of the y was camped apart from Áed's main force, and was attacked by the Leinstermen. Although Cerball drove them off with heavy loss, Cennétig son of Gáethíne, a kinsman of Cerball, was killed in the battle. With a final notice of an expedition to Connacht and Munster in 871, the Fragmentary Annals are interrupted. In the Annals of Ulster, nothing more is said of Cerball until his death in 888. The next king of Osraige was his brother Riacán.

== Legacy ==
Cerball is remembered in historical sources as a great and heroic king, possessed of victorious and daring exploits with many colourful anecdotes written about him. He is mentioned in all the major Irish annals, bringing the Osraige into military prominence during his reign, securing a very strong marriage alliance with the high king and gaining political independence away from Munster. Irish, Scandinavian and Welsh sources record his existence; several annals in particular contain unique information about him.

=== The Fragmentary Annals ===
Of all the Irish annals, the Fragmentary Annals of Ireland contain the most information about him, being composed in Osraige likely at the commission of his descendant Donnchad mac Gilla Pátraic, and therefore caution must be exercised over it as a source. Cerball is portrayed as an archetype of a Christian king who consistently vanquishes his enemies, especially pagan Vikings; yet is recorded allying with rival bands of Vikings to defeat them during his early career. Those Vikings allied with Cerball are portrayed in a more favorable light than those he defeats, thus mitigating the stigma of a Christian king allying with pagan marauders.

=== Landnámabók ===
The Icelandic Landnámabók describes Cerball (Kjarvalur) as ruler of Dublin and Earl of Orkney and opens with a list of the most prominent rulers in Viking-age Europe, listing this Ossorian king alongside Popes Adrian II and John VIII; Byzantine Emperors Leo VI the Wise and his brother Alexander; Harald Fairhair, king of Norway; Eric Anundsson and his son Björn Eriksson rulers of Sweden; Gorm the Old king of Denmark; and Alfred the Great, king of England.

While it is unsurprising that Cerball's great-great-grandson should have commissioned a work in which his most illustrious ancestor was portrayed in a heroic light, it is less obvious why Cerball in particular should have such a prominent place in the Icelandic sagas and in the genealogies of the founding families of Iceland as recorded by the Landnámabók. The Landnámabók mentions "Kormlöð", "Rafarta, the daughter of Kjarval", "Dufnial, who was the son of Kjarval" and "Friðgerðr, the daughter of Kjarval". Rafarta or Raforta is also mentioned in Njál's saga, Gretti's saga and the Laxdæla saga, and Friðgerðr in the Vinland sagas. The marriage of "Eithne, daughter of King Kjarval of Ireland" and Hlodvir Thorfinnsson, Earl of Orkney is reported in the Orkneyinga saga and Earl Sigurd the Stout, who was killed at the battle of Clontarf is called their son.

Some of these names are Irish: Kormlöð is the common name Gormflaith, Eithne too is clearly Irish as is Dufnial. It is doubtful whether Rafarta or Fridgerd are Irish, and there are clearly difficulties with the supposed number of generations. Insofar as any conclusions have been reached by historians of Ireland, it appears that the supposed descendants of Cerball left for Iceland in the generation before Donnchad mac Gilla Patraic, towards the end of the tenth century. Given the likely date at which the Landnámabók was compiled, this is rather too far in the past for the genealogies to be considered very reliable. Adding to the uncertainty, the genealogies of the Osraige themselves were subject to comprehensive rewriting in Cerball's time and immediately afterwards, attaching them to the Laigin of Leinster.

It has been suggested that the importance of Cerball in Icelandic writings stems from the popularity of the Fragmentary Annals of Ireland among the Norse-Gaels of eleventh century Ireland, who passed these accounts on to the Icelanders, who then attached this famous and warlike king to their ancestry. Whether Cerball was in fact an ancestor of many prominent settler families is, however, of rather less importance than the fact that the Icelanders considered it worth reporting their descent from Cerball mac Dúnlainge, whether real or contrived. As with the adoption of Norse names, sagas and other features, and the creation of the Norse-Gael culture, Cerball's adoption in Iceland is an example of the contacts between Norse and Gaelic society in the Viking Age.

=== Annales Cambriae ===
Cerball's repose is noted in the Annales Cambriae for the year 887, which is noteworthy as he is the only Irish king mentioned therein who wasn't an Uí Néill high king. This indicates his contemporary importance.

=== Other textual sources ===
Cerball appears to be referenced in The Prophecy of Berchán, although not by name.

=== Modern day ===
Cerball is noted by historians to have been a patron of noteworthy building projects in his kingdom, and his reign likely birthed a flourishing of artistically fine stone carving in Osraige. In late February 2017, Kilkenny's new Medieval Mile Museum opened to the public, featuring an exhibit which highlights king Cerball's role as a powerful patron of Osraige's early high cross carving tradition.

== Family tree ==
Cerball is hailed as an illustrious ancestor of several prominent lineages in both Ireland, Scotland and Iceland. He is the direct male ancestor of the kings of Osraige after him, and as such is the direct male-line progenitor of the Mac Giolla Phádraig clan who maintained kingship over Osraige and succeeded in the Barony of Upper Ossory in addition to the Earldom of the same and the Castletown Barons. He is also direct-male ancestor of the prominent clan Ua Braonáin (O'Brennan) of Uí Duach (Idough) in Osraige who were a junior sept stemming from a younger son of Cerball. Icelandic literature also names him as the maternal grandfather of Helgi the Lean, a prominent settler of Iceland from whom many Icelandic families claim descent, including the saga-hero Gunnar of Hlíðarendi.

  Dungal, d. 842.
  |
  |_____________________________________
  |                  |                 |
  |                  |                 |
  Cerball, d. 888. Riacan, d. 894. Land, d. 890. = Mael Sechnaill  = Aed Finlaith   = Gaethine
  |
  |__________________________________________________________________________________________________
  |                   |        |                  |         |         |          |            |
  |                   |        |                  |         |         |          |            |
  Diarmait, d. 928. Cuilde Ceallach, d.908.      Rafarta Dunghal Kormled Frithgertr Ethna
  |                            |                 =Eyvindr   |        =Grimolfr  =Iorirhima   =Hlotvir, Earl of Orkney
  |                            |__________       Bjarnason  |          |                       |
  ?                            |          |                 Dufthakr   |                       |
  |                            |          |                 |         Thorgrimr               Signuth digri, Earl of Orkney, d. 1014.
  |                  Donnchad, d. 976. Cuilen, ____________|
  Ceallach,          |                 d. 933.  |           |
  d. 1003.           |                          |           |
              Gilla Patraic, d. 996.            Vilbadr Askell hnokhan
                     |                          |
                     |                          |__________
          Mac Giolla Phádraig                   |         |
            Kings of Osraige                    |         |
                                                Bjollok Bjolan

== See also ==
- Dál Birn
- Cherball
- Fragmentary Annals of Ireland
- Kingdom of Ossory
- Kings of Osraige
- Fitzpatrick
- Mac Giolla Phádraig

== Notes ==
Regnal titles
Preceded by Dúngal mac Fergaile	King of Osraige; 842–888	Succeeded by Riagan mac Dúnlainge
