= Codex Salmanticensis =

Medieval Irish manuscript

The Codex Salmanticensis (Brussels, Royal Library 7672–4) is a medieval Irish manuscript containing an extensive collection of Irish saints' Lives, now in the Royal Library of Belgium in Brussels. It was culled by the compilers from various sources, some of which can be identified as distinct, regionally focused groups in the text.

One such group is that of the O'Donohue Lives, so-called after one of the manuscript's contributors, Diarmaid Ó Dúnchadha. These works are mostly eighth- and ninth-century Lives of saints whose monasteries lay in central Ireland (around Slieve Bloom), in parts of Munster, Mide and Leinster. They include saints like Ciarán of Saighir, Ailbe of Emly, Ruadán of Lorrha and Cainnech of Aghaboe.

The collection also includes five short Lives of saints associated with northern churches (in Ulster or the Airgíalla): Mo Lua of Drumsnat, Daig of Inniskeen, Mochta of Louth, Éogan of Ardstraw and Mac Nisse of Connor. Their feast days are given in August or the beginning of September. These texts are relatively late, but Charles-Edwards has suggested that they ultimately derive from an earlier, northern Irish work used for reading on the festivals, which he calls the Northern Lectionary.
