= Cú Cherca mac Fáeláin =

- King of Osraige
- Reign: 693–712
- Predecessor: Fáelchar Ua Máele Ódrain
- Successor: Fland mac Congaile; Ailill mac Fáeláin; Cellach mac Fáelchair
- Died: 712
- Issue: Anmchad mac Con Cherca
- House: Dál Birn
- Father: Fáelán mac Crundmaíl

Cú Cherca mac Fáeláin (died 712) was a King of Osraige in modern County Kilkenny. He was the son of Fáelán mac Crundmaíl (died 660), a previous king. The dynasty that ruled over Osraige in the early Christian period was known as the Dál Birn. He ruled from 693 to 712. The Irish annals mention only his death. His son Anmchad mac Con Cherca (died circa 761) was also King of Osraige.
