= Óengus Osrithe =

Óengus Osrithe son of Criomthann Mór (son of Iar mac Sétnai) and his wife Cindnit, daughter of Dáire mac Degad and Morand, was the semi-legendary first king and eponymous ancestor of the Osraige people of Ireland. His supposed floruit lies in the late first or early second century AD.

== Legacy ==
As the founder of the kingdom, it has been regarded that his descendants took their name from him; but scholars have more recently suggested that perhaps the tribal name "Osraige" which means "people of the deer" may pre-date him and instead became his appellation. He wedded Side, daughter of the druid Delbath, brother of Mogh Ruth, and is buried in the tumulus in Kilcullen, Co. Kilkenny. His son and heir was Loegaire Birn Buadach, whose ruling descendants bore the tribal name "Dál Birn".

== Texts ==
He appears in a number of surviving tribal genealogies, notably in MS Rawlinson B 502. He is named with his father, mother and maternal grandfather in the Banshenchas: "Oengus Ossory son of Cremthand, his mother was blameless Cindnit daughter of Daire Dord son of Dedad. There was a king of bloody struggles."
