= Kings of Osraige =

Rulers of a medieval Irish kingdom

Map of Osraige (circa 900)

The kings of Osraige (alternately spelled Osraighe and Anglicised as Ossory) reigned over the medieval Irish kingdom of Osraige from the first or second century AD until the late twelfth century. Osraige was a semi-provincial kingdom in south-east Ireland which disappeared following the Norman Invasion of Ireland. A number of important royal Ossorian genealogies are preserved, particularly MS Rawlinson B502, which traces the medieval Mac Giolla Phádraig dynasty back through Óengus Osrithe, who supposedly flourished in the first or second century. and one in the Book of Leinster (also known as "Lebor na Nuachongbála"). Recent analysis of ninth and tenth century regnal succession in Osraige has suggested that in peaceful times, kingship passed primarily from eldest to youngest brother, before crossing generations and passing to sons and nephews.

== History ==
=== Early kings of Osraige ===
The following kings are listed in all major genealogies, but originate from an early period in Irish protohistory, and likely stem from oral tradition.

- Óengus Osrithe (ca. 100 AD), semi-legendary founder of the kingdom of Osraige.
- Loegaire Birn Buadach, a quo Dál Birn.
- Amhalgadh
- Echach Lámdóit
- Buan
- Niadh Corb
- Cairbre Caomh (not named in the Book of Leinster)
- Conall
- Rumaind Duach
- Laignich Fáelad
- Bicne Cáech
- ...

=== Kings of Osraige to 1103 ===
The following is a synchronism of the kings of Osraige from historic times until the death Gilla Patraic Ruadh in 1103, after which the kingdom experienced some political fracturing.

- Colmán Mór (died 574) son of Bicne Cáech
- Feradach Finn mac Duach (died 581 or 583), of the Corcu Loígde
- Colmán mac Feradaig (died 603)
- Rónán Rígflaith – (died 624) son of Colmán Mór
- Scannlan Mór mac Cinn Fáelad (died 644)
- Crundmáol – (died 656) son of Rónán Ríghfhlaith
- Fáelán mac Crundmaíl (died 660)
- Tuaim Snámha (died 678)
- Fáelchar Ua Máele Ódrain (died 693)
- Cú Cherca mac Fáeláin (died 712)
- Fland mac Congaile
- Ailill mac Fáeláin
- Cellach mac Fáelchair (died 735)
- Forbasach mac Ailella (died 740)
- Anmchad mac Con Cherca (died circa 761)
- Tóim Snáma mac Flainn (died 770)
- Dúngal mac Cellaig (died 772)
- Fáelán mac Forbasaig (died 786)
- Máel Dúin mac Cummascaig
- Fergal mac Anmchada (died 802)
- Dúngal mac Fergaile (802–842)
- Cerball mac Dúnlainge (842–888) One of Osraige's most outstanding kings, he reigned during a turbulent period of Irish history and amidst Viking invasions, lead Osraige on a path to prominence in Ireland's politics, even becoming militarily dominant over Leath Moga. Leading his army, he is recorded as having slaughtered 1,200 Danes at Carn-Brammin (Bramblestown), in Co. Kilkenny in 845 AD, with many other victories besides. In 847 AD it is proposed that he had "Saint Canice's" Round Tower built.
- Riacan mac Dúnlainge (888–894)
- Diarmait mac Cerbaill (894–905) (deposed)
- Cellach mac Cerbaill (905–908)
- Diarmait mac Cerbaill (908–928) (reinstated)
- Cuilen mac Cellaig (928–933)
- Donnchad mac Cellaig (934–976)
- Gilla Pátraic mac Donnchada (976–996)
- Cellach mac Diarmata (996–1003) Killed by his cousin, Donnchadh son of Giolla Pádraig.
- Donnchad mac Gilla Pátraic (1003–1039) (Also king of Leinster from 1033 to 1039) The Annals of Tigernach call Donnchad the "champion of Ireland".
- Gilla Patráic mac Donnchada (1039–1055)
- Muirchertach mac Gilla Pátraic (????–1041)
- Domnall mac Gilla Pátraic (1055 – after 1072)
- Donnchad mac Domnaill (after 1072–1090)
- Gilla Pátraic Ruad (1090–1103)

=== Kings of Osraige from 1103 to the Norman Invasion ===
Upon the death of king Gilla Patráic Ruadh in 1103, two smaller portions of the kingdom broke away from the central polity of Osraige; the area of Mag Lacha in the far north of Osraige became independently ruled by the Ua Caellaide (Kelly or Kealy) clan, and Desceart Osraige ("South Osraige") in the very southern area of Osraige, ruled intermittently by rival members of the Mac Giolla Phádraig (Fitzpatrick) clan.

- Cerball (1103-c.1113)
- Domnall mac Donnchada Mac Gilla Patráic (????–1113)
- Finn Ua Caellaide (????-????) (ruled Clarmallagh independently from the rest of Osraige)
- Donnchad Balc mac Gilla Patráic Ruaid (after 1119–1123) Probably the same Donnchad who accompanied the great fleet led by Toirdhealbhach Ó Conchobhair, king of Ireland on a predatory excursion, along with king of Leinster Éanna son of Murchadh, to consume the food supplies of Munster.
- Donnchad Dub (c. 1121 – c. 1121)
- Murchad Mac Murchada (c. 1123–1126)
- Conchobar mac Cerbaill (1123 – c. 1126)
- Gilla Patráic mac Domnaill Mac Gilla Patráic (c. 1126–1146) Killed by his distant relatives, the Uí Braonáin clan.
- Cerball mac Domnaill Mac Gilla Patraic (1146–1163)
- Murchad Ua Caellaide (????–????)
- Donnchad mac Gilla Patráic Mac Gilla Patráic (after 1151–1162)
- Domnall Mac Gilla Patráic (1162/63–1165)
- Donchadh Ua Donoghoe Mac Gilla Patráic (1162–1185) Blinded Éanna Mac Murchadha, crown-prince of Leinster.
- Diarmait Ua Caellaide (1170–1172) (lord of Clarmallagh, the northernmost part of Osraige)
- Maelseachlainn Mac Gilla Patráic (1185–1194)

=== Kings of Osraige from the Normans to the Tudors ===
The kingdom of Osraige did not fully disappear after the arrival of Norman mercenaries in Ireland, though it was greatly reduced in size. The lineage of Osraige's Lords remained in power in the northern third of their original territory, having been pushed back through the arrival of William Marshal who sought to consolidate his wife's huge claim to Leinster, including Osraige. The lords who ruled this area were sometimes also known in the annals as ‘Princes of Osraige’, ‘Kings of Upper Osraige’ (or ‘North Osraige’), or ‘Kings of Slieve Bloom’; it was a period when the concept of Irish ‘Kingship’ was being replaced with ‘Lordship’. They generally maintained their independence from the Crown or any shire until the final submission of Barnaby McGillaPatrick in 1537 and his subsequent conversion to the title of 1st Baron Upper Osraige in 1541, however, from the mid 1400s to the early 1500s they were at times in alliance with the House of Ormond as well as the House of Kildare. Fitzpatrick historians such as Carrigan and Shearman could not, in their day, access all available records, and their interpretations of succession are often confusing and ambiguous. The following list may include powerful members of different lines of the family, who may or may not necessarily have been inaugurated as the Mac Gilla Pátraic per se, but who were likely recognized nonetheless as the de facto ruler or potential heir, and noteworthy enough for reference by the annalists and in key records such as Liber Ruber, the Ormond Deeds and the Kildare Rental.

- Donnell Clannagh Mac Gilla Patráic (fl. 1212–1219) Edmund Campion hailed him as a "peerless warrior".
- Donnagh mac Anmchadh mac Donnogh Mac Gilla Pátraic (d. 1249) Hailed by the annalists as an outstanding captain and relentless foe of the English, he is recorded as often reconnoitering the English forces while wearing a variety of disguises.
- Jeffrey mac Donnell Clannagh Mac Gilla Patráic (d.1269) "King of Slieve Bloom".
- Eochaghan Mac Gilla Patráic(?) (d. 1281)
- Mollachlyn Mac Gilla Patráic(?) (fl. 1286) Paid the Crown £6 for peace in 1286, together with his brother Finn.
- Donnogh Mac Gilla Patráic (d. 1324) Donnogh Mac Gilla Patráic,"Lord of Ossory" was summoned by Edward II to campaign with him in Scotland.
- Donnell Duff Mac Gilla Patráic(?) (d. 1325) Slain by his own relatives.
- Donough mac Jeffrey Mac Gilla Patráic (d. 1329–30)
- Scanlan Mac Gilla Patráic (fl. 1333–6)
- Carroll Mac Gilla Patráic (d. 1345)
- Diarmaid Mac Gilla Pátraic (fl. 1346) Launched an attack on the English garrison at Aghaboe; the nearby Abbey of which was burned as collateral damage in 1346.
- Maelechlainn mac Jeffrey Mac Gilla Patráic (d. 1367)
- Finghin (Fineen) Mac Gilla Pátraic (d. 1383/86) Founded the Friary at the Abbey of Aghaboe for the Dominican Order in 1382.
- Mac Gilla Pátraic (d. 1383/96) ‘Lord of Osraige’.
- Finghin Óg (‘The Younger’) Mac Gilla Pátraic ‘Lord of Osraige’ (c.1396–c.1417). In 1394 was among a number of Irish who submitted to Richard II. Married Art Óg mac Murchadha Caomhánach’s daughter Sadhbh.
- Donnchadh Mór Riabhach ‘The Great, The Swarthy’ Mac Gilla Pátraic ‘Lord of Osraige’ (c. 1417–c. 1448) he is largely overlooked by Carrigan and Shearman. Referred to as ‘Donatus magnus’ in the Ormond Deeds and ‘Chief’ in Annála Connacht. He was the father of three sons all slain by the Butlers in 1443: Finghin, Diarmaid and Maeleachlainn Ruadh.
- Finghin Mac Gilla Pátraic (d. 1443) Styled ‘Kinglet’ by Shearman. He and his brother Diarmaid were murdered in Kilkenny at the behest of MacRichard Butler.
- Finghin Mór Mac Gilla Pátraic ‘Lord of Osraige’ (ca. 1448–1468). His wife was the daughter of Edmund Butler. Died of the plague.
- Seághan (John) mac Finghin Mór Mac Gilla Patráic (d. 1468) Said by Carrigan to be buried with his wife Katherine, along with his son Brian and his wife Noirin O'More in ‘Kilpatrick's’ mortuary chapel at the Priory of Fertagh, underneath a stone altar table carved with effigies of Seán and his wife Katherine O’Malloy in high relief. The Annals of the Four Masters provide his pedigree as, ‘son of John, son of Fineen, son of Fineen, son of Fineen, son of Donnell’.
- Tadhg (Teague) Dubh (‘the Black’) mac Finghin Óg Mac Gilla Pátraic (d. 1487) Tanist of Osraige. Once a cleric in training he was rebuked by Pope Nicholas V for being among those, including the ‘White Earl’, as ‘more cruel than Pharaoh’.
- Séafra (Geoffrey) mac Finghin Óg Mac Gilla Pátraic Styled ‘King of Osraige’ and ‘Lord of Osraige’ he was ‘Chief of his nation’ from 1468–1489; brother of Seán he likely lived to an old age since he was blind when he died.
- Brian na Luirech (‘of the mail coats’) Mac Gilla Pátraic (d. 1511), is said by Carrigan to be the son of Seághan (John) Mac Gilla Pátraic and Katherine O'Molloy; his wife being Noirin O'More, daughter of Uaithne O'More, and sister of Melaghlin O'More, Lords of Laois. Carrigan also claimed Brian constructed the sarcophagus tomb carvings in the mortuary chapel at Fertagh, but this is problematic given Carrigan’s claim Seághan died in 1468; the tomb is dated authoritatively as 1510–1540. Carrigan also claimed Brian descended from the line of Finghin Mór but without providing any primary reference. Rather, Carrigan miscited noteworthy historians, such as Keating and Mac Fhirbhisigh, and ignored the authoritative Annals of Ireland as well as An Leabhar Muimhneach. The authoritative sources referred to all have Brian (c.1478–1575) as the son of Seághan. It has been suggested that Carrigan may have confused Brian na Luirech with another clann chieftain, Brian mac Toirealach mac Donnchah Mór Mac Giolla Phádraig
- William Mac Giolla Phádraig, a much overlooked cleric and clann chieftain in the early 16th century.
- Brian mac Toirealach mac Donnchah Mór Mac Giolla Phádraig, clan spokesman in 1518.
- Brian Mac Gilla Pátraic (c.1478–1575) The last Lord of Osraige; he became the first great Irish lord to adopt the Tudor policy of ‘surrender and re-grant’, and thereby became Barnaby Fitzpatrick, 1st Baron Upper Ossory. From him spring the Barons and Earls of Upper Ossory and Gowran, and Barons Castletown. He had at least five wives and was the father of many sons, including Brian the 2nd Baron Upper Ossory, and Florence Fitzpatrick, 3rd Baron Upper Ossory.

== See also ==
- Dál Birn
- Mac Giolla Phádraig
- Fitzpatrick (name)
- Kingdom of Osraige
- Irish kings
- Irish royal families
