= Donnchad mac Gilla Pátraic =

- King of Ossory, King of Leinster
- Predecessor: Cellach mac Diarmata
- Successor: Gilla Patráic mac Donnchada
- Died: 1039
- Dynasty: Dál Birn > Mac Giolla Phádraig

Donnchad mac Gilla Pátraic (Donagh MacGillapatrick) (died 1039), was King of Osraige and King of Leinster.

== Life and reign ==
His father was Gilla Pátraic mac Donnchada. He took the throne of Osraige prior to 1027 and was active militarily. He blinded his brother Tadc, thus eliminating him from succession. King Donnchad inflicted a slaughter on the Dál gCais and Eóganachta, led by Donnchad mac Briain in a predatory incursion into Osraige. Brian's son launched a second expedition into Osraige again in 1031, in which he was again defeated by Mac Gilla Pátraic. Mac Briain was successful in his third attack on Osraige in 1034.

He took the throne of Leinster in 1033 and held the Fair of Carman, a prerogative of the kings of Leinster.

In 1039, Donnchadh led a combined force of Ossorians and the Leinstermen, raiding and burning as far as Knowth and Drogheda. The Annals of Tigernach eulogize him as "overking of Leinster and Ossory, champion of Ireland".

== Legacy ==
A daughter of Gilla Pátraic was Aífe, mother of Diarmait mac Máel na mBó, King of Leinster (died 1072). Aside from being the ancestor of later Fitzpatricks, he is considered the ancestor and namesake of the (O')Dunphys of Ossory, also called (O')Donoghoes.
