= Lóegaire Birn Búadach =

Second King of Osraige

Lóegaire Birn Búadach (pronunciation) (fl. 1st or 2nd century AD) was the second king of Osraige after the death of his father, Óengus Osrithe. His epithet "Búadach" means "Victorious". His name became the appellation of his later descendants the Dál Birn who ruled Osraige until the Norman Invasion of Ireland, and even remained landed gentry in Upper Ossory until the death of Bernard FitzPatrick, 2nd Baron Castletown in 1937.

He is not to be confused with Lóegaire Búadach from the Ulster Cycle legends.
