= Dál Birn =

Tribal epithet for the descendants of the second king of Osraige

Dál Birn ("portion" of Birn) is a tribal epithet found in Irish sources which refers to the descendants of Loegaire Birn Buadach, the hereditary ruling lineage of the kingdom of Osraige in Ireland.

== Lineage ==
This illustrious lineage produced Osraige's native kings and lords- all claimed to be commonly descended on the paternal line from the second-century king Loegaire Birn Buadach (Loegaire Birn "the Victorious"), son of Óengus Osrithe and gave rise to a number of related individuals and later, clans which remained intact and identifiable into the modern era. Yet, the controversial scholar, T. F. O'Rahilly, considered Loegaire Bern Buadach, the mythical ancestor Dál Birn, was the 'same personage as the Loegaire Buadach of the Ulidian tradition' and, therefore, were not Laigin. The term Dál Birn was in use long before the advent of surnames in Ireland, yet because of long-standing oral and written traditions in Ireland, it continued to be used as a mark of hereditary distinction in sources composed through the twelfth century after the common advent of surnames.

For a two-hundred year period beginning the late fifth century, the native Dál Birn kings were temporarily displaced by an allied Corcu Loígde dynasty which ruled Osraige until finally being overthrown. A number of the Corcu Loígde kings are recorded as being periodically slain by the native inhabitants of Osraige until the re-establishment of the Dál Birn. Dál Birn descendants remained in control of parts of Osraige, even after the Norman Invasion of Ireland, with the continuation of the Mac Giolla Phádraig lordship in Upper Ossory, and O'Brennan control of Idough.

This senior Dál Birn lineage historically remained the most visible and in possession of an original portion of Osraige until the death of Bernard FitzPatrick, 2nd Baron Castletown, in 1937.

== Sources ==
The term or its equivalent is found in a number of early and high medieval Irish sources, including Codex Salmanticensis and Codex Kilkenniensis in the vitae of St. Ciarán of Saighir; the Félire Óengusso, and in Bodleian Library, MS Rawlinson B 502.

== Dál Birn descendants ==
=== Lineages ===
In addition to all the native Ossorian kings (not counting the Corcu Loígde), a number of other notable family names descend from Dál Birn:

- Mac Giolla Phádraig of Osraige, which in the mid-sixteenth century Normanized their surname to Fitzpatrick. From these spring the Barons and Earls of Upper Ossory, Gowran, and Castletown.
- Ua Braonáin (or Ó Braonáin) of Idough, descended from Braonáin, a younger son of Cerball mac Dúnlainge, Anglicized to O'Brennan.

=== Individuals ===
- St. Ciarán of Saigir
- St. Nem of Aran
