= Killamery =

Village in County Kilkenny, Ireland

Killamery Cill Lamraí
- Village
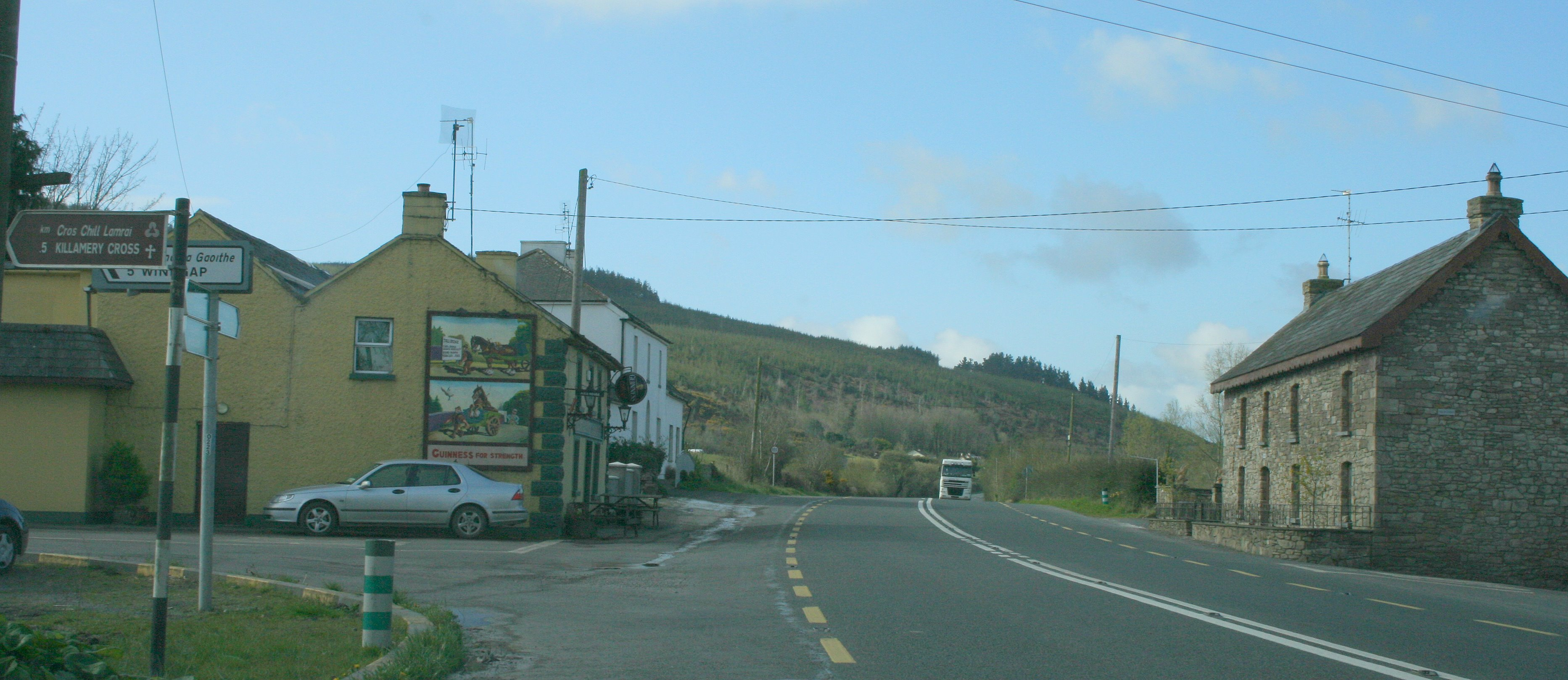
- The N76 through Killamery

- Location in Ireland
- Coordinates: 52°28′37″N 7°26′51″W
- Country: Ireland
- Province: Leinster
- County: County Kilkenny
- Time zone: UTC+0 (WET)
  - Summer (DST): UTC-1 (IST (WEST))
- Irish grid reference: S375362

Killamery (Irish: Cill Lamraí) is a village in County Kilkenny, Ireland. Located near the County Tipperary border, it is in a townland and civil parish of the same name. Killamery lies on the N76 national secondary road, halfway between Kilkenny to the northeast and Clonmel to the southwest.

== History ==
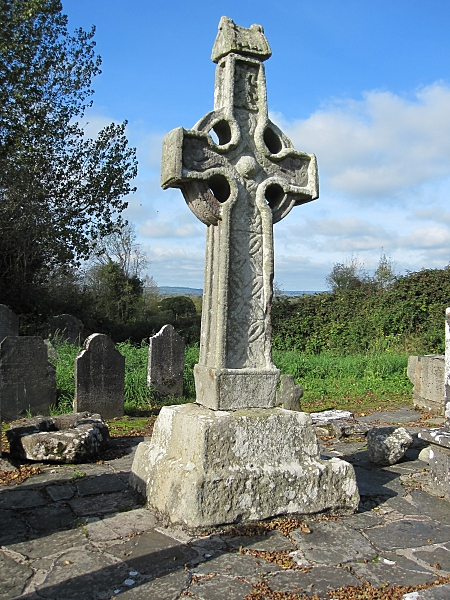
Killamery High Cross

Killamery was the site of a 7th-century monastery associated with the abbacy of Saint Gobhan, who died 639 and was buried in the grounds of St. Fintan of Clonenagh's Abbey, County Laois. Killamery High Cross is part of the Ossory group of High crosses. This "west Ossory group" also includes the Celtic crosses at Ahenny, Kilkieran and Tibberaghny. In addition to two bullauns and a holy well, the remains of a motte are also located nearby.

The Church of Ireland church in Killamery, St. Nicholas's Church, is included on the Record of Protected Structures maintained by Kilkenny County Council. It was built in 1815 and is now in ruin.

Killamery Hill was known in Old Irish as Dromm Derg (modern Irish: Drom Dearg) meaning "red ridge", and is mentioned in a number of Fenian Cycle poems by this name.

== Amenities ==
The area is served by JJ Kavanagh and Sons bus route number 717 (Dublin Airport to Clonmel), via a bus stop which is near "The Auld House" pub. As of 2022, the pub was for sale.

== See also ==
- List of abbeys and priories in Ireland (County Kilkenny)
