= Kilkieran High Crosses =

- Ardchrosa Chill Chiaráin (Irish)
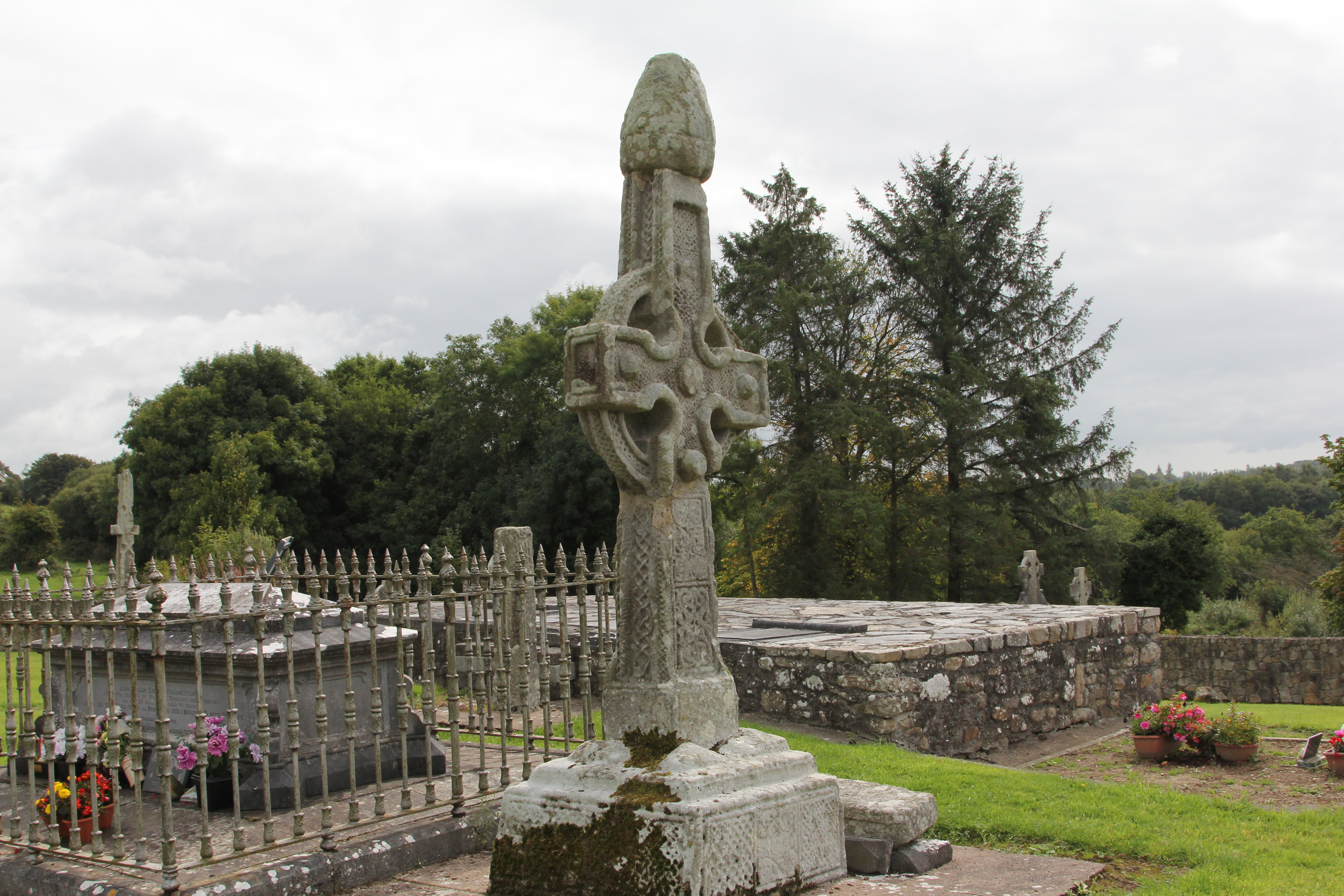
- West cross

- Location within Ireland
- 52.397809°N 7.380761°W
- Type: High crosses
- Location: Castletown, Skough, County Kilkenny, Ireland

History
- Built: 9th century AD

Site notes
- Area: Lingaun Valley

National monument of Ireland
- Official name: Kilkieran High Crosses
- Reference no.: 79

Kilkieran High Crosses are a group of high crosses which form a National Monument in County Kilkenny, Ireland.

== Location ==
Kilkieran High Crosses are located on the grounds of the former monastery, about 2 km (1.2 mi) south of Ahenny. Nearby in County Tipperary are the Ahenny high crosses.

== History ==
Kilkieran was formerly a monastery dedicated to Ciarán of Saighir. The high crosses at Kilkieran were erected in the 9th century, and form part of the West Ossory group, including the Killamery High Cross, Ahenny and Kilree. Local legend claims that the tall North Cross was once destroyed in an act of iconoclasm, but was painstakingly reconstructed in the mid-19th century by blind local stonemason Paddy Laurence, who had lost his sight while working on the Palace of Westminster in London.

== Crosses ==
The crosses are made of sandstone; there are three of them and the fragments of a fourth.

=== West Cross ===
The west (decorated) cross is 3.55 metres (11.6 ft) high with a conical cap and is similar to those at Ahenny. Carvings include eight horsemen, chrysanthemums, Celtic interlace and a mitre-like crown.

=== North Cross ===
The North (Tall) Cross is 3.5 metres (11 ft) tall and is unusually shaped: tall and slender, with short arms and no ring and a circular base, with hatched mouldings on the west face.

=== Plain Cross ===
The Plain (East) Cross is 2.8 metres (9.2 ft) tall and undecorated, except for mouldings and a central boss that mimic metalwork, and a heavy mitre-like crown.

=== Other artefacts ===
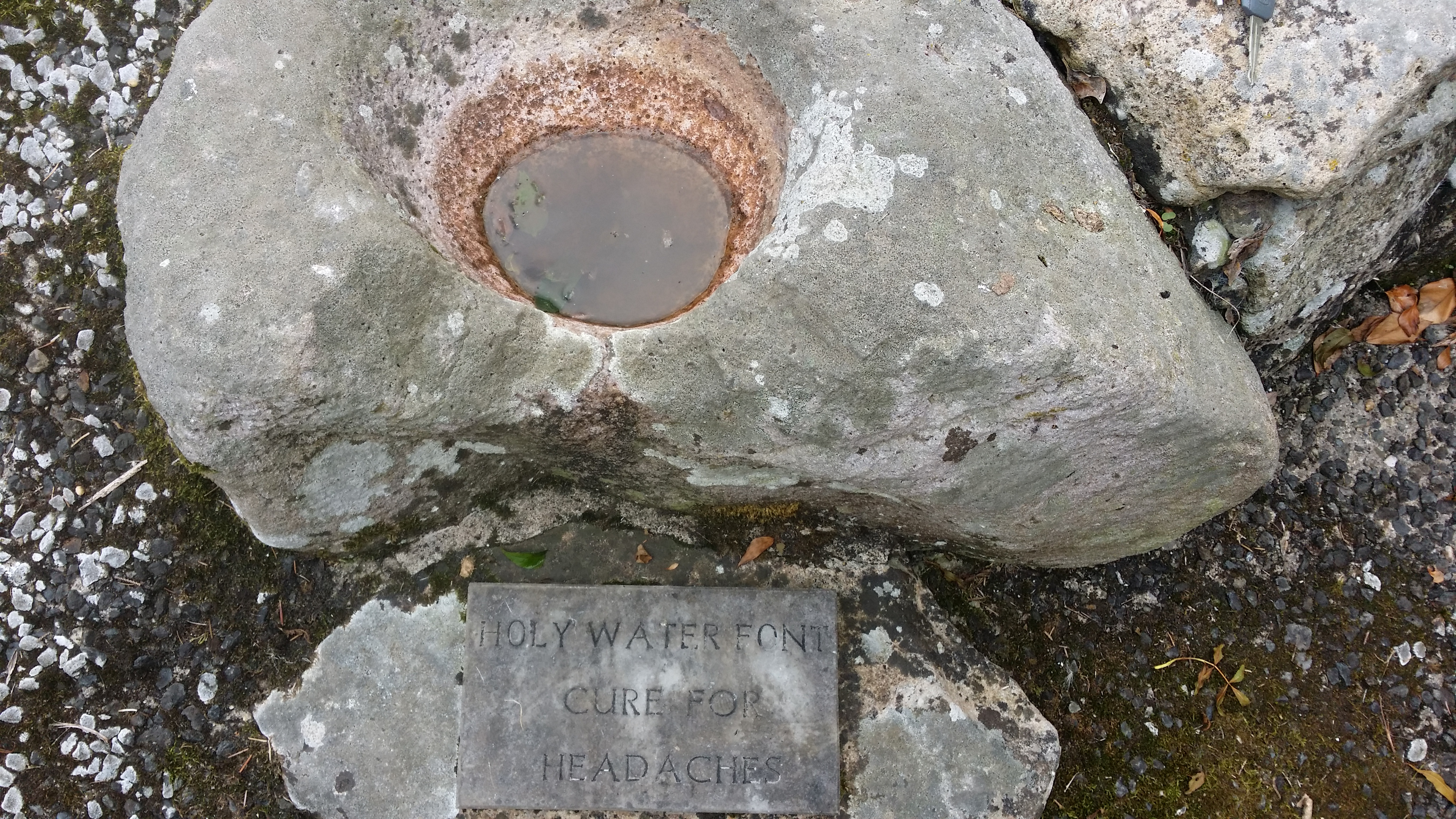
The holy water font was locally held to cure headaches.

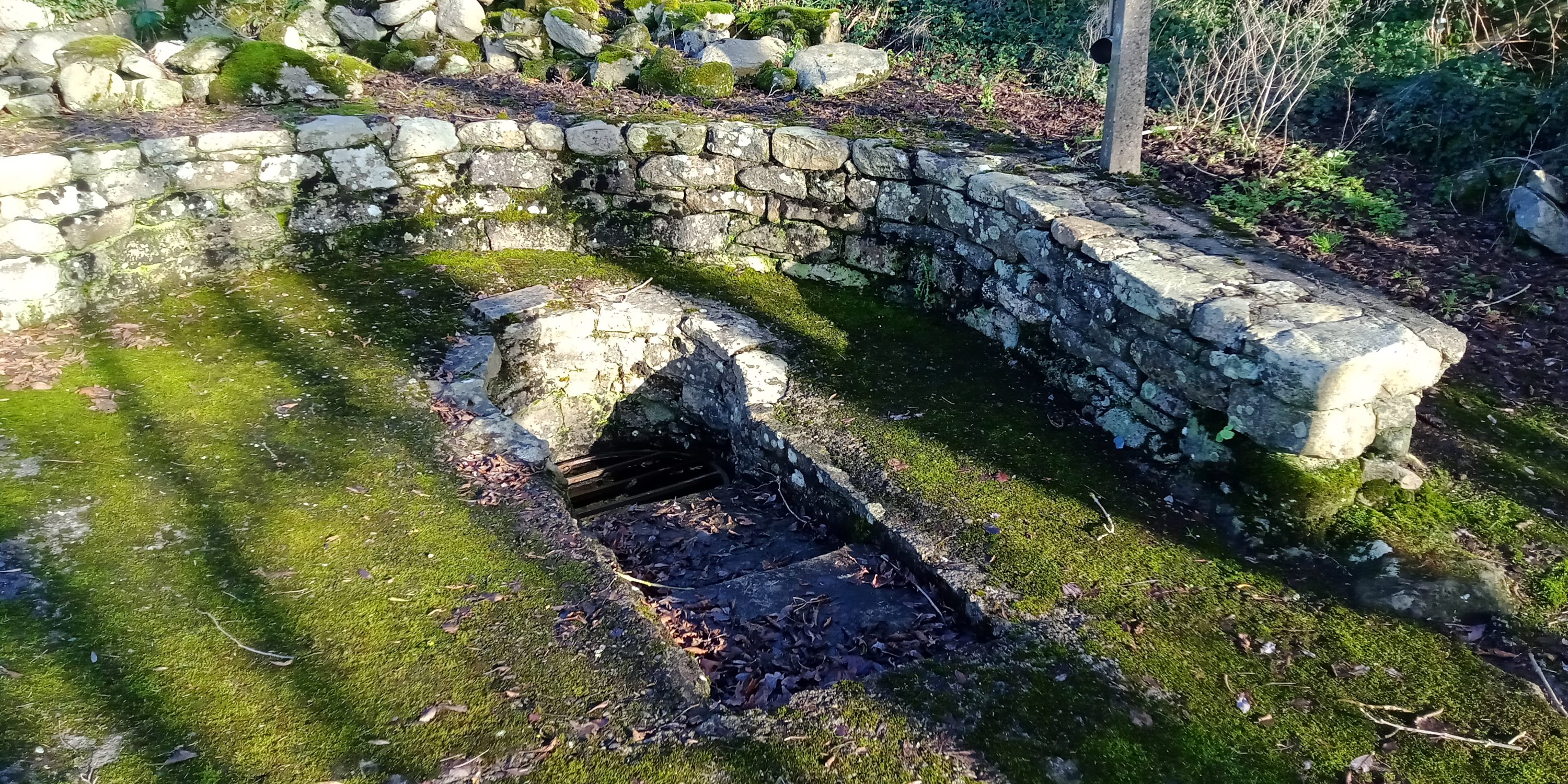
Holy well near Kilkieran High crosses

A phallic-shaped standing stone is near the wall, near St. Ciarán's holy well, which is near a bullaun and a holy water font.
