= Ahenny =

Village in County Tipperary, Ireland

Ahenny Áth Eine
- Village
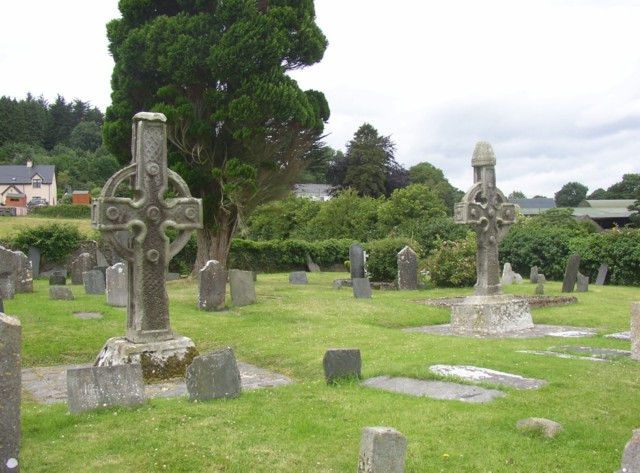
- Ahenny High Crosses-Kilclispeen Graveyard

- Location in Ireland
- Coordinates: 52°24′44″N 7°23′38″W
- Country: Ireland
- Province: Munster
- County: County Tipperary
- Time zone: UTC+0
  - Summer (DST): UTC-1

Ahenny (Irish: Áth Eine, meaning 'ford of Eine') is a small village and townland in County Tipperary, Ireland. It is notable for its ancient Irish high crosses. Close to the village is the early Christian foundation of Kilclispeen monastery and in the adjoining graveyard stand two celebrated Irish High Crosses: the Ahenny High Crosses.

== History ==
Ahenny is situated close to the border dividing counties Tipperary and Kilkenny and nestles on the slopes of Carrigadoon Hill overlooking the valley of the river Lingaun. Scattered remnants of a once thriving slate industry spanning the Tipperary-Kilkenny border-lands, act as reminders of modern Ahenny's roots.

A number of megalithic tombs dot the landscape surrounding Ahenny, which was located in the ancient Kingdom of Ossory. Two kilometres east on Killmacoliver Hill is the Baunfree megalithic tomb, while two kilometres north, the passage tomb of Knockroe (the Coshel) sits on a hill summit. The Knockroe passage tomb shares similarities with Newgrange, Knowth and Loughcrew and is one of the most decorated tombs outside of the Boyne valley group.

Ten kilometres to the west is Slievenamon Hill, again with a Neolithic summit cairn. The river Lingaun rises on Slievenamon and flows east for some ten kilometres before turning south to flow through a valley between Carrigadoon and Kilmacoliver hills. This bend occurs some six kilometres north of Ahenny and it marks the boundary of Leinster from Munster, and the boundary between County Tipperary and County Kilkenny. It also lies at the intersection of three ecclesiastic dioceses: Ossory, Waterford and Cashel.

== Ahenny high crosses ==
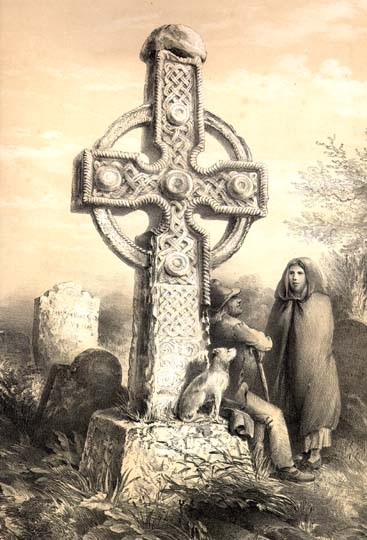
The Kilclispeen cross: an illustration from the 1857 book Illustrations of Some of the Most Interesting Sculptured Crosses of Ancient Ireland

The Ossory group of high crosses are amongst the earliest (8th/9th century) examples of Celtic high crosses to be found in Ireland, with those in west Ossory considered the oldest.

The west Ossory group of Celtic crosses includes Ahenny and Kilkieran – two kilometres south-east., Eight kilometres further south is Tibberaghny. Killamery High Cross eight kilometres north of Ahenny completes this close group: although Kilree High Cross sixteen miles north-east of Ahenny is often included.

=== Cross iconography ===
The Ahenny high crosses (national monument #124) are early examples of Irish high crosses which still bear resemblance to their wooden predecessors. Celtic knotwork and bosses imitate in stone what a carved wooden cross would have looked like. One of the Ahenny crosses also bears a fine image of an Irish chariot, which along with other high crosses, was used as the main inspiration of a modern reconstruction. Nearby in County Kilkenny are the Kilkieran High Crosses.
