= Preaching cross =

Type of cross

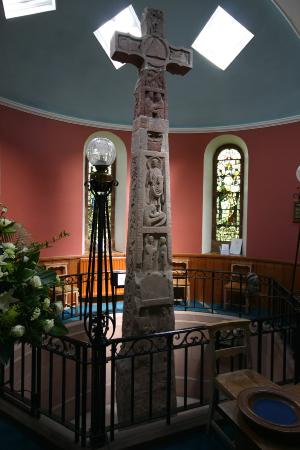
The Ruthwell Cross

A preaching cross is a Christian cross sometimes surmounting a pulpit, which is erected outdoors to designate a preaching place.

In Great Britain and Ireland, many free-standing upright crosses – or high crosses – were erected. Some of these crosses bear figurative or decorative carvings, or inscriptions in runes. There are surviving free-standing crosses in Cornwall and Wales, in the island of Iona and in the Hebrides, as well as those in Ireland. Other stone crosses are found in Lancashire, Cumbria and the Scottish Borders, some of these in the Anglo-Saxon cross making tradition, like the famous Ruthwell Cross. Whether these were especially associated with preaching is uncertain. Later market crosses were generally not, although all sorts of public announcements, no doubt sometimes including preaching, took place beside them.

== See also ==
- Khatchkars
- Celtic knot
- High cross
- Hill of Crosses
- Iconography
- Pulpit
