= High cross =

Any free-standing Christian cross made of stone – often richly decorated

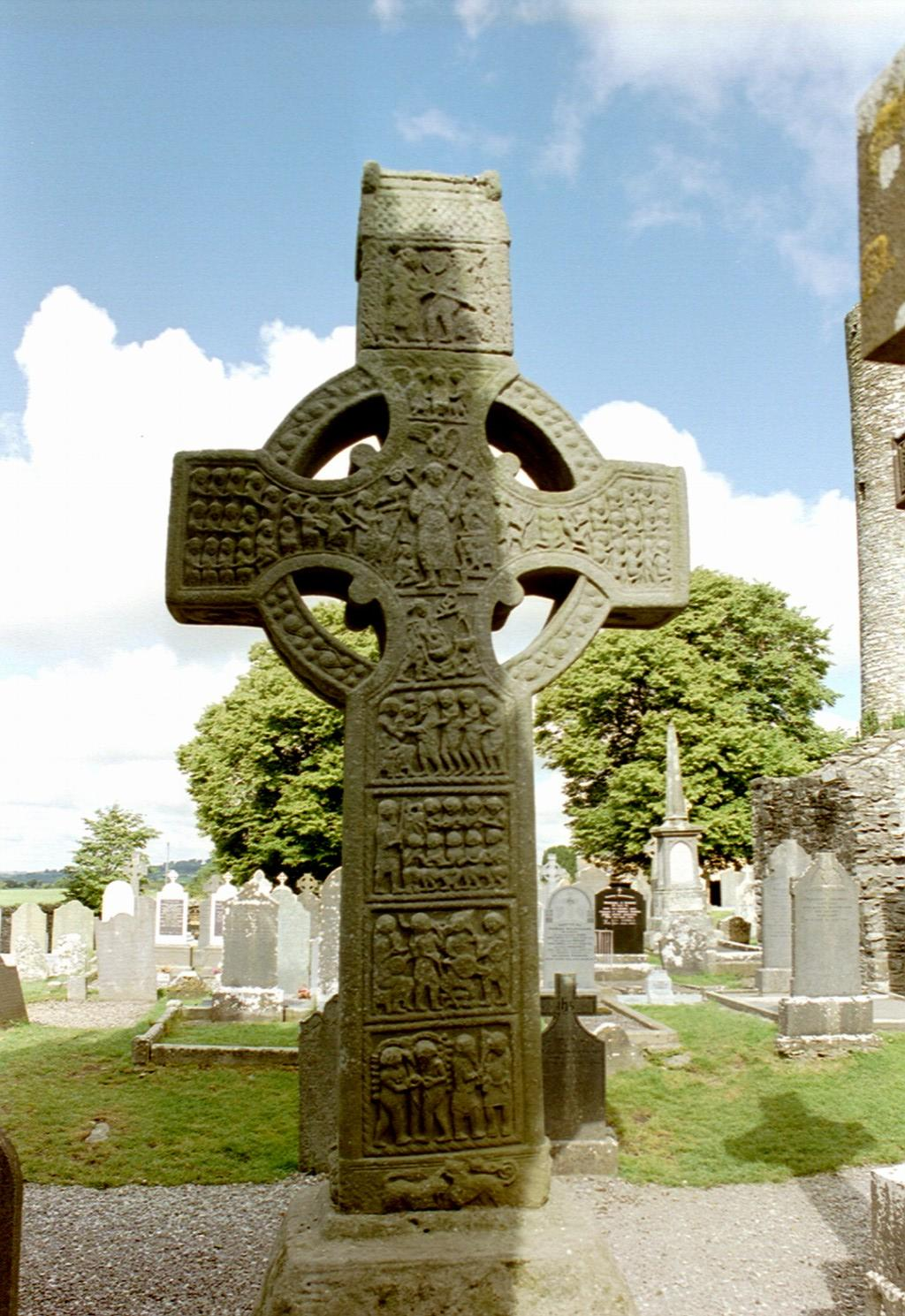
Muiredach's High Cross, Monasterboice, 9th or 10th century

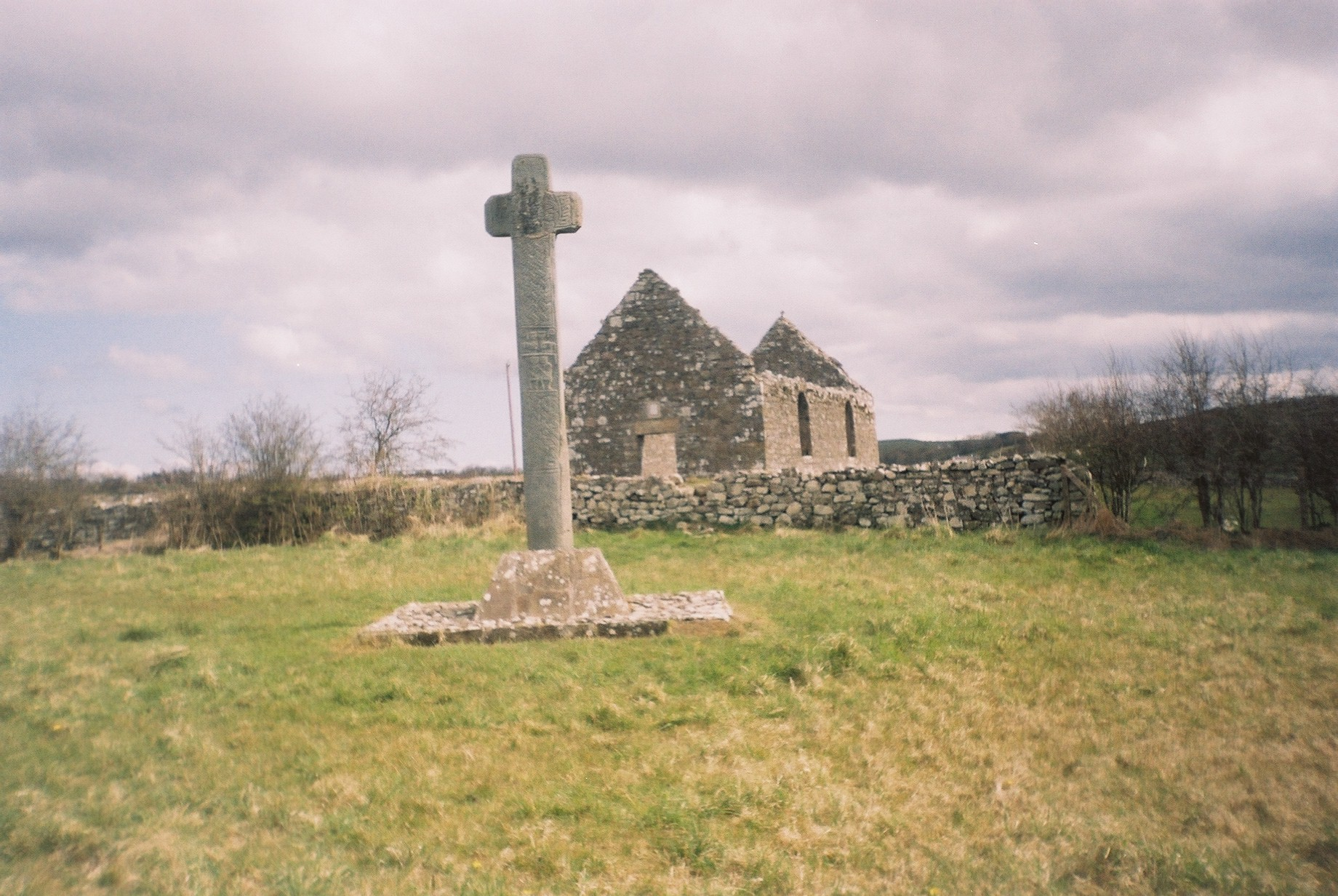
A simpler example, Culdaff, County Donegal, Ireland

A high cross, or standing cross (Irish: cros ard / ardchros, Scottish Gaelic: crois àrd / àrd-chrois, Welsh: croes uchel / croes eglwysig), is a free-standing Christian cross made of stone, often richly decorated. There was a unique early medieval tradition in Ireland and Great Britain of raising large sculpted stone crosses, usually outdoors. These probably developed from earlier traditions using wood, perhaps with metalwork attachments, and earlier pagan Celtic memorial stones; the Pictish stones of Scotland may also have influenced the form. The earliest surviving examples seem to come from the territory of the Anglo-Saxon kingdom of Northumbria, which had been converted to Christianity by Irish missionaries; it remains unclear whether the form first developed in Ireland or Britain.

Their relief decoration is a mixture of religious figures and sections of decoration, such as knotwork, interlace and, in Britain, vine-scrolls, all in the styles also found in insular art in other media, such as illuminated manuscripts and metalwork. They were probably normally painted, perhaps over a modelled layer of plaster; with the loss of paint and the effects of weathering the reliefs, in particular scenes crowded with small figures, are often now rather indistinct and hard to read.

The earlier crosses were typically up to about two metres or eight feet high, but in Ireland examples up to three times higher appear later, retaining thick massive proportions, giving large surface areas for carving. The tallest of the Irish crosses is the so-called Tall Cross at Monasterboice, County Louth. It stands at seven metres or twenty-two feet high. Anglo-Saxon examples mostly remained slender in comparison, but could be large; except in earlier Northumbrian examples their decoration is mostly ornamental rather than figures. The crosses often, though not always, feature a stone ring around the intersection, forming a Celtic cross; this seems to be an innovation of Celtic Christianity, perhaps at Iona. Although the earliest example of this form has been found on fifth-seventh century Coptic textile. The term "high cross" is mainly used in Ireland and Scotland, but the tradition across Great Britain and Ireland is essentially a single phenomenon, though there are certainly strong regional variations.

Some crosses were erected just outside churches and monasteries; others at sites that may have marked boundaries or crossroads, or preceded churches. Whether they were used as "preaching crosses" at early dates is unclear, and many crosses have been moved to their present locations. They do not seem to have been used as grave-markers in the early medieval period. In the 19th century Celtic Revival Celtic crosses, with decoration in a form of insular style, became very popular as gravestones and memorials, and are now found in many parts of the world. Unlike the Irish originals, the decoration usually does not include figures.

== Ireland and Great Britain ==
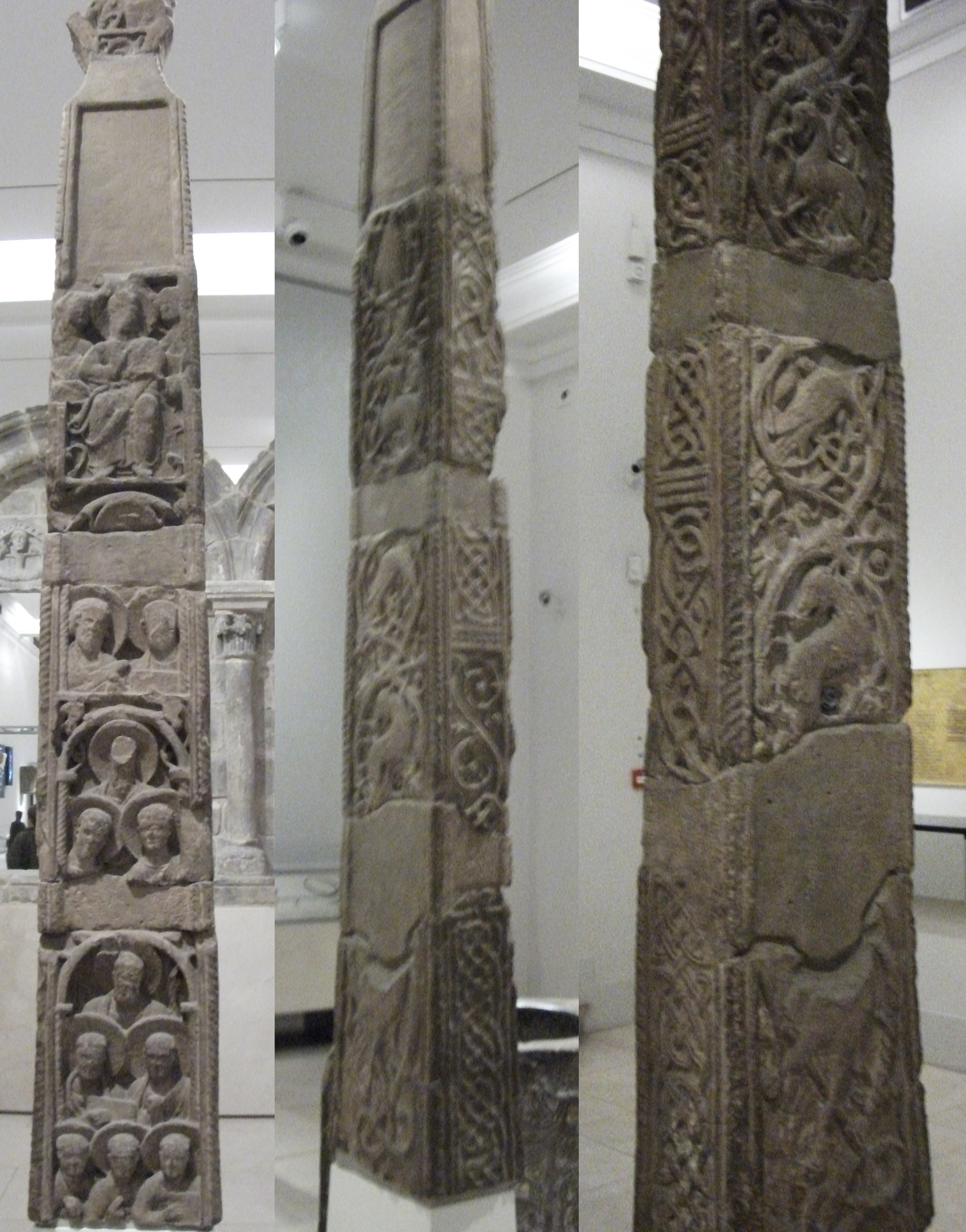
Three views of the Northumbrian Easby Cross of 800–820

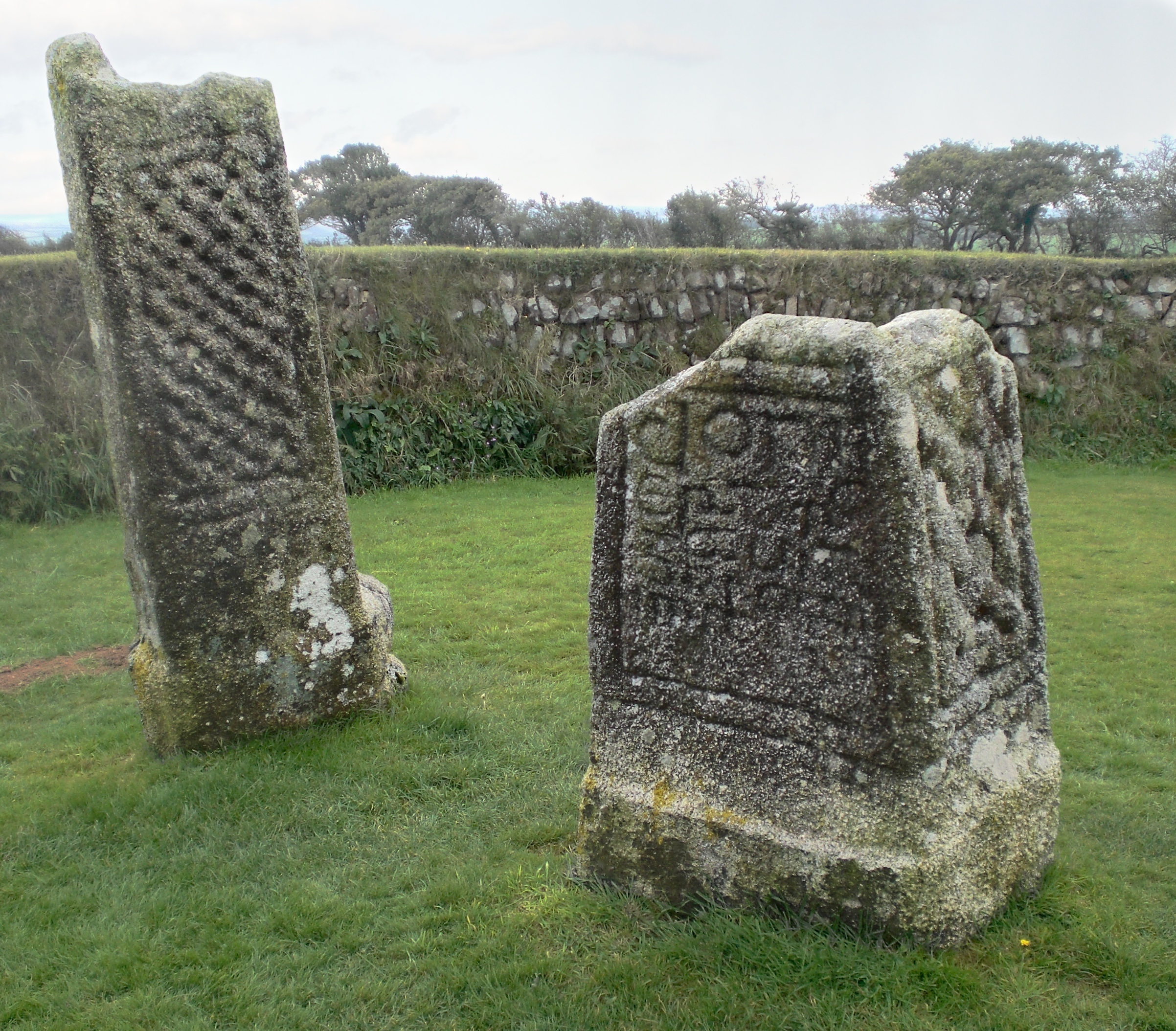
King Doniert's Stone in East Cornwall, ninth century

High crosses are the primary surviving monumental works of Insular art, and the largest number in Britain survive from areas that remained under Celtic Christianity until relatively late. No examples, or traces, of the putative earlier forms in wood or with metal attachments have survived; the decorative repertoire of early crosses certainly borrows from that of metalwork, but the same is true of Insular illuminated manuscripts. Saint Adomnán, Abbot of Iona who died in 704, mentions similar free standing ringed wooden crosses, later replaced by stone versions. Perhaps the earliest surviving free-standing stone crosses are the Carndonagh stones in Carndonagh, Donegal, which appear to be erected by missionaries from Iona. fleeing the Viking raiders, "giving Iona a critical role in the formation of ringed crosses". The round bosses seen on early crosses probably derive from Pictish stones. High crosses may exist from the 7th century in Northumbria, which then included much of south-east Scotland, and Ireland, though Irish dates are being moved later. However the dates assigned to most of the early crosses surviving in good condition, whether at Ruthwell and Bewcastle, the Western Ossory group in Ireland, Iona or the Kildalton Cross on Islay, have all shown a tendency to converge on the period around or slightly before 800, despite the differences between the Northumbrian and Celtic types. The high cross later spread to the rest of the British Isles, including the Celtic areas of Wales, Devon, Brittany and Cornwall, where ogham inscriptions also indicate an Irish presence, and some examples can be found on Continental Europe, particularly where the style was taken by Insular missionaries.

Most Irish High crosses have the distinctive shape of the ringed Celtic cross, and they are generally larger and more massive, and feature more figural decoration than those elsewhere. They have probably more often survived as well; most recorded crosses in Britain were destroyed or damaged by iconoclasm after the Reformation, and typically only sections of the shaft remain. The ring initially served to strengthen the head and the arms of the high cross, but it soon became a decorative feature as well.

The high crosses were status symbols, either for a monastery or for a sponsor or patron, and possibly preaching crosses, and may have had other functions. Some have inscriptions recording the donor who commissioned them, like Muiredach's High Cross and the Bewcastle Cross. The earliest 8th- or 9th-century Irish crosses had only ornament, including interlace and round bosses, but from the 9th and 10th century, figurative images appear, sometimes just a figure of Christ crucified in the centre, but in the largest 10th century examples large numbers of figures over much of the surface. A fine example from this time period can be found on the shores of Lough Neagh in the Irish province of Ulster at Ardboe, County Tyrone. This cross stands around 18 feet tall and consists of 22 panels of biblical events. Some late Irish examples have fewer figures (often Christ accompanied by a local bishop or abbot), approaching life-size, and carved in very high relief. The Irish tradition largely died out after the 12th century, until the 19th-century Celtic Revival, when the Celtic cross form saw a lasting revival for gravestones and memorials, usually just using ornamental decoration and inscriptions. These are now found across the world, often in contexts without any specific link to the Insular Celts or Britain.

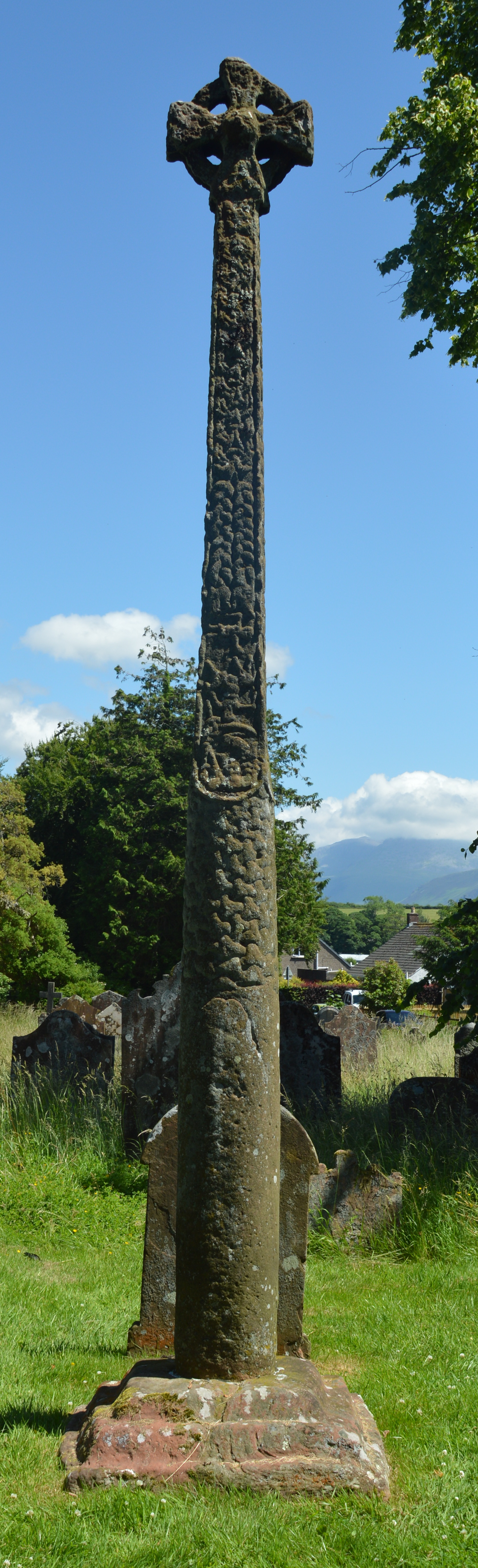
Gosforth, Cumbria

Anglo-Saxon crosses were typically more slender, and often nearly square in section, though when, as with the Ruthwell Cross and Bewcastle Cross, they were geographically close to areas of the Celtic Church, they seem to have been larger, perhaps to meet local expectations, and the two 9th century Mercian Sandbach Crosses are the largest up to that period from anywhere. The heads tend to be smaller and usually not Celtic crosses, although the majority of cross-heads have not survived at all. Carved figures in these large examples are much larger and carved in deeper relief than the Irish equivalents with similar dates – only some very late Irish crosses show equally large figures. Anglo-Saxon decoration often combines panels of vine-leaf scrolls with others of interlace, although the placement and effect from a distance is similar to Celtic examples. Smaller examples may have only had such decoration, and inscriptions, which are much more common on Anglo-Saxon than Irish crosses.

After the Viking invasions, the settled Norse population of the Danelaw adopted the form, and a number of crosses combine Christian imagery with pagan Norse myths, which the Church seems to have tolerated, and adopted at least as metaphors for the period when conversion was bedding down. The Gosforth Cross, a very rare almost-complete cross in England, is an example. By the 10th century such Anglo-Norse crosses were the bulk of the production in England, as the high cross seems to have been abandoned further south, although the simple and practical Dartmoor crosses, no doubt an essential aid to navigating Dartmoor, appear to have continued to be made for centuries after. Given the tough granite used, decoration is mostly slight and they are hard to date confidently. Market crosses, many once dating to the early medieval period, have continued to be erected and replaced until modern times.

In Pictish Scotland the cross-slab, a flat stone with a cross in relief or incised on an essentially rectangular stone, developed as a hybrid form of the Pictish stone and the high cross. The cross is normally only on one side of the stone and the remaining areas of the stone may be covered with interlace or other decoration. These are usually distinguished from true high crosses.

== Scandinavia ==
The tradition of raising high crosses appeared at a time when Norse settlers appeared in the British Isles and met a Christian culture. A fragmentary cross has been discovered in Granhammar in Vintrosa parish in Närke, Sweden and testify to the English mission in the central Swedish provinces. The Swedish cross was very similar to a cross in Leek, Staffordshire, and may have been made by an English immigrant. In Norway the British tradition was more widely accepted and some 60 stone crosses are known from the country, but only four of them can be safely dated to the Viking Age thanks to runic inscriptions on the crosses. Many of the crosses have probably been raised on pagan grave fields when the family was baptised. Later, they were moved to cemeteries. The high cross tradition also probably helped increase the popularity of raising runestones (often with engraved crosses) in Sweden.

== Notable examples ==
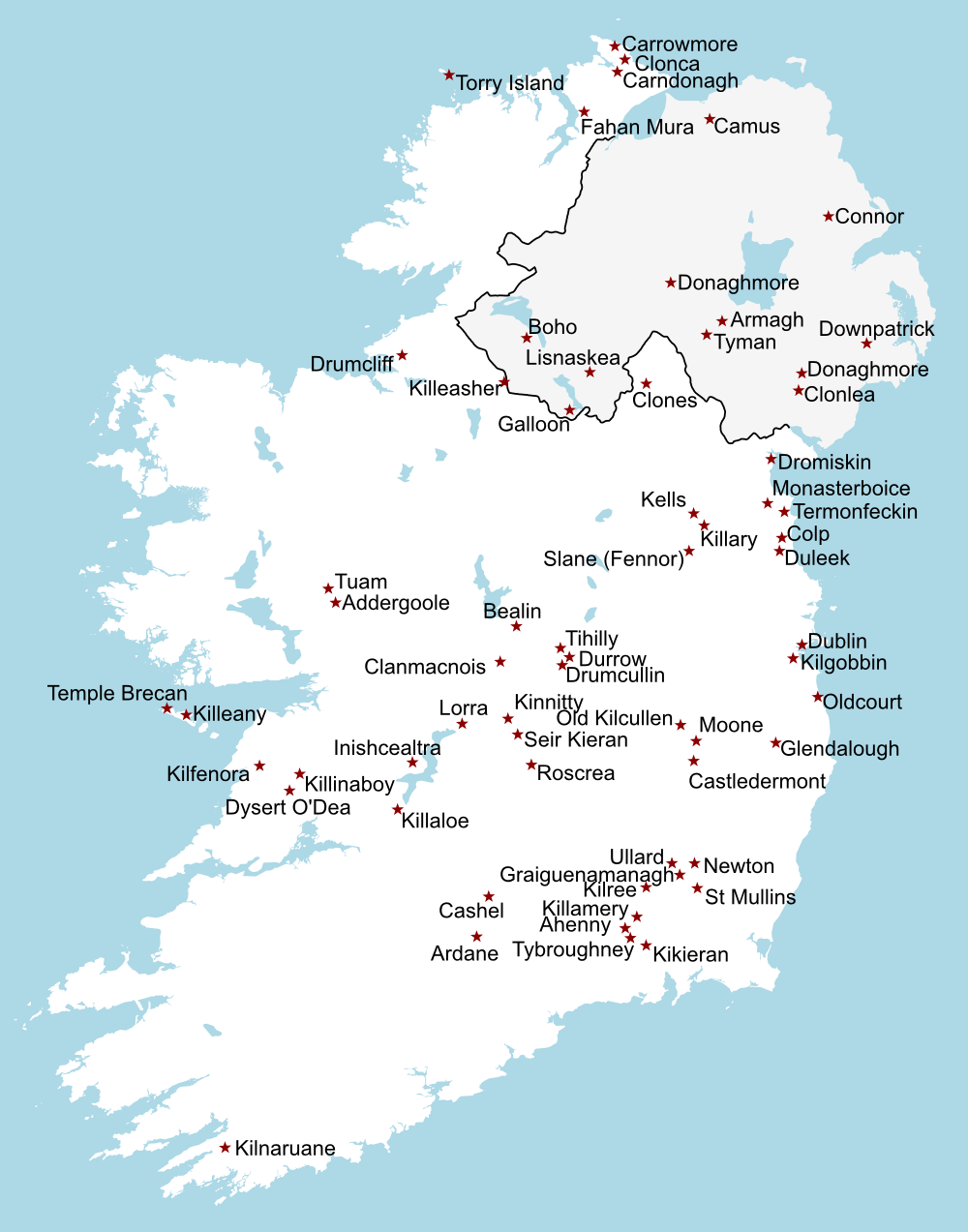
Distribution of high crosses in Ireland

Amongst the most famous are:

- Muiredach's Cross and West Cross at Monasterboice, County Louth
- The Clonmacnoise crosses: Cross of the Scriptures (the original 9th century cross is housed in a museum, but a copy stands on the original site), and the North and South Crosses.
- The Nether (or Lower) Cross, a 9th-century granite cross with ornate carving, in the graveyard of St. Canice's Church, established by St. Canice, Finglas village, Dublin. The Cross was taken from its original location in the grounds of St. Canice's Abbey and buried to prevent damage by Cromwellian forces in 1649. It was found 160 years later intact and moved to its present location.
- The Anglo-Saxon Ruthwell Cross from Scotland, 8th century, with relatively large figures.
- The Anglo-Saxon Bewcastle Cross Northumbrian
- The Anglo-Saxon Irton Cross, Cumbria showing affinity to the style of Bewcastle
- The Pictish/Early Medieval Dupplin Cross in Strathearn, Scotland
- The Pictish/Early Medieval Camus Cross in Angus, Scotland

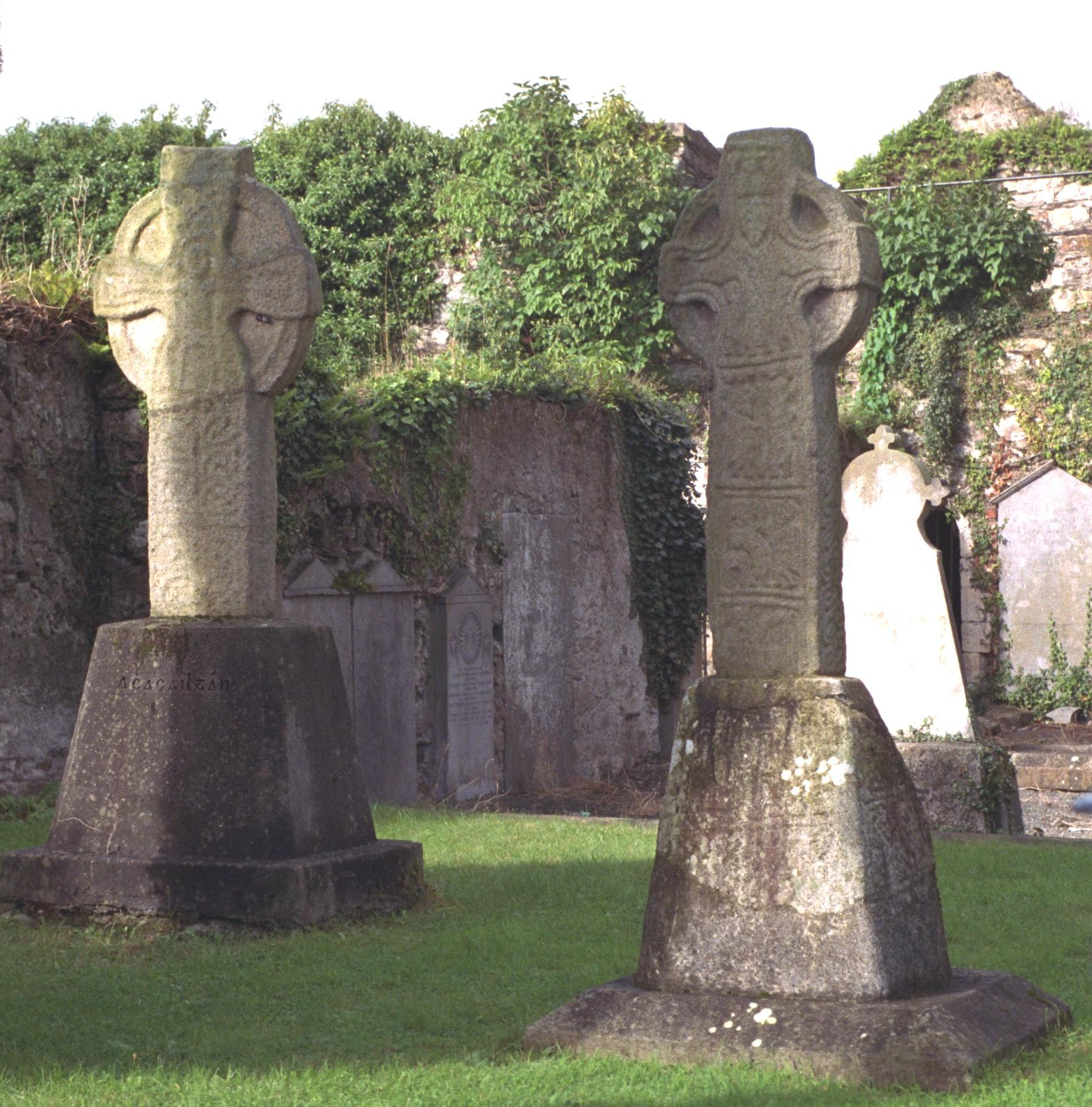
Graiguenamanach crosses, County Kilkenny, east side

- Classic examples of 9th-century Pictish cross-slabs: Aberlemno 2 and 3 at Aberlemno, Angus
- The 8th century Kildalton Cross from the Hebrides
- Iona Abbey has two crosses, with others on the island.
- Saint Tola's High Cross. A 12th-century cross at Dysert O'Dea near O'Dea Castle showing Christ and a bishop carved in high relief on the east side, with geometric motifs and animal ornament on the other sides. On the west side of the base are shown the Temptation, with Adam and Eve beneath the tree of knowledge, while on the north side is some ceremony with several figures holding croziers. This is a particularly finely preserved twelfth-century example, that does not use the circle of the Celtic cross.
- The Ahenny High Crosses. The two sandstone Ahenny crosses date from the 8th to 9th centuries and are among the earliest of the ringed high crosses. Ahenny, County Tipperary, near the Kilkenny border, and the Monastic site of Kilclispeen, or the church of St. Crispen
- Ardboe High Cross, a 10th-century cross near Cookstown, eroded, showing 22 panels with scenes from the Old and New Testaments.
- St. Kevin's Cross, Glendalough, a 12th-century cross, well preserved, made of granite.
- South Cross, Kells, County Meath, the best preserved of several 10th century crosses in the town.
- Doorty Cross, Kilfenora, County Clare; 12th century, has a bishop and two other clerics carved on it.
- Kilree High Cross, 9th century high cross said to be the burial place of Niall Caille, located 4 km southeast of Kells Priory, County Kilkenny.
- Kilkieran High Crosses, three crosses near Ahenny, County Tipperary: Plain Cross (unadorned), West Cross (with much ornamentation), Long Shaft Cross (has a long shaft with decoration).
- The two Moone High Crosses, in County Kildare near Moone. The large cross is believed to have been carved between 900 and 1000 AD. It is highly decorated and 5.33 m. high

== Modern period ==
From the 19th century, many large modern versions have been erected for various functions, and smaller Celtic crosses have become popular for individual grave monuments, usually featuring only abstract ornament, usually interlace.

In 1887, the Rev. William Slater Calverley commissioned a replica life-sized copy of Gosforth cross and had it erected in the churchyard at Aspatria, Cumbria.[3]

In the early 21st century, Irish sculptor Brendan McGloin was commissioned by the Ancient Order of Hibernians, Portland to handcraft a full size replica of the Clonmacnoise Cross of the Scriptures. The 13-foot, 5 tonne sandstone cross was completed in 2007 and shipped from Donegal to Portland, Oregon, where it will stand as a Famine memorial. In 2016, a high cross was erected outside Wakefield Cathedral, West Yorkshire, England, carved from stone quarried in Holmfirth and carved by Celia Kilner. This was based on the remains of a Saxon high cross, dated 930 A.D.

== Gallery ==
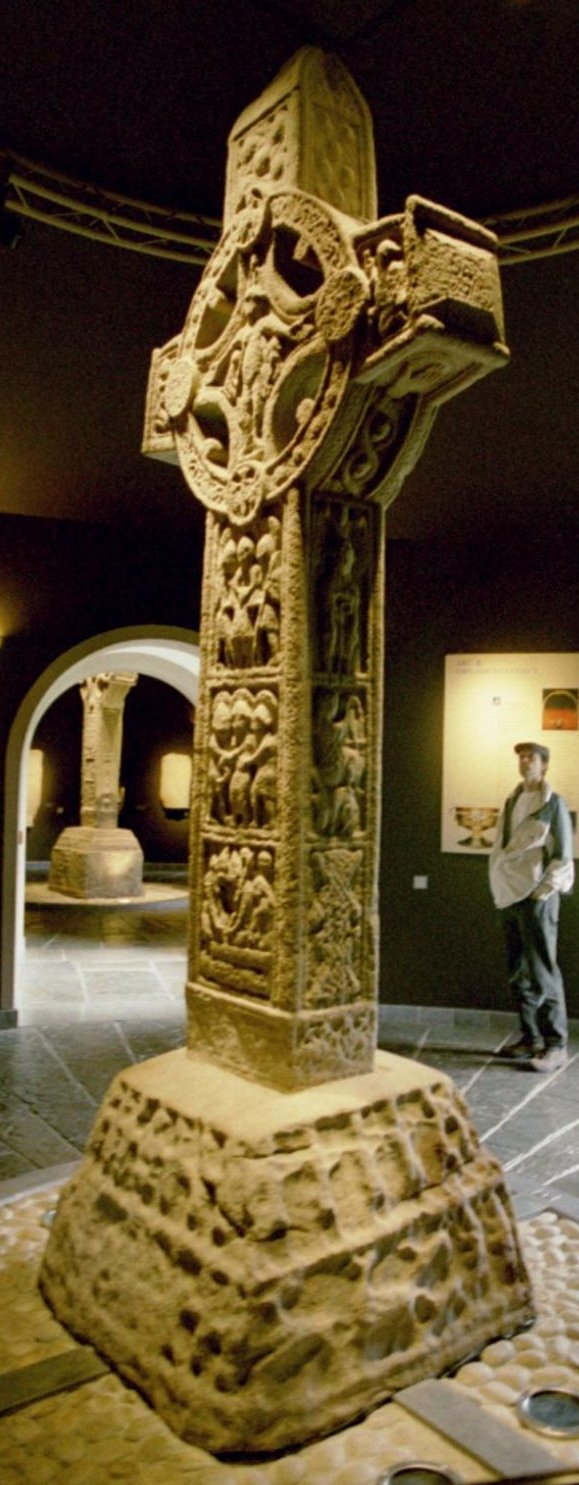
Cross of the Scriptures (Clonmacnoise, Ireland)

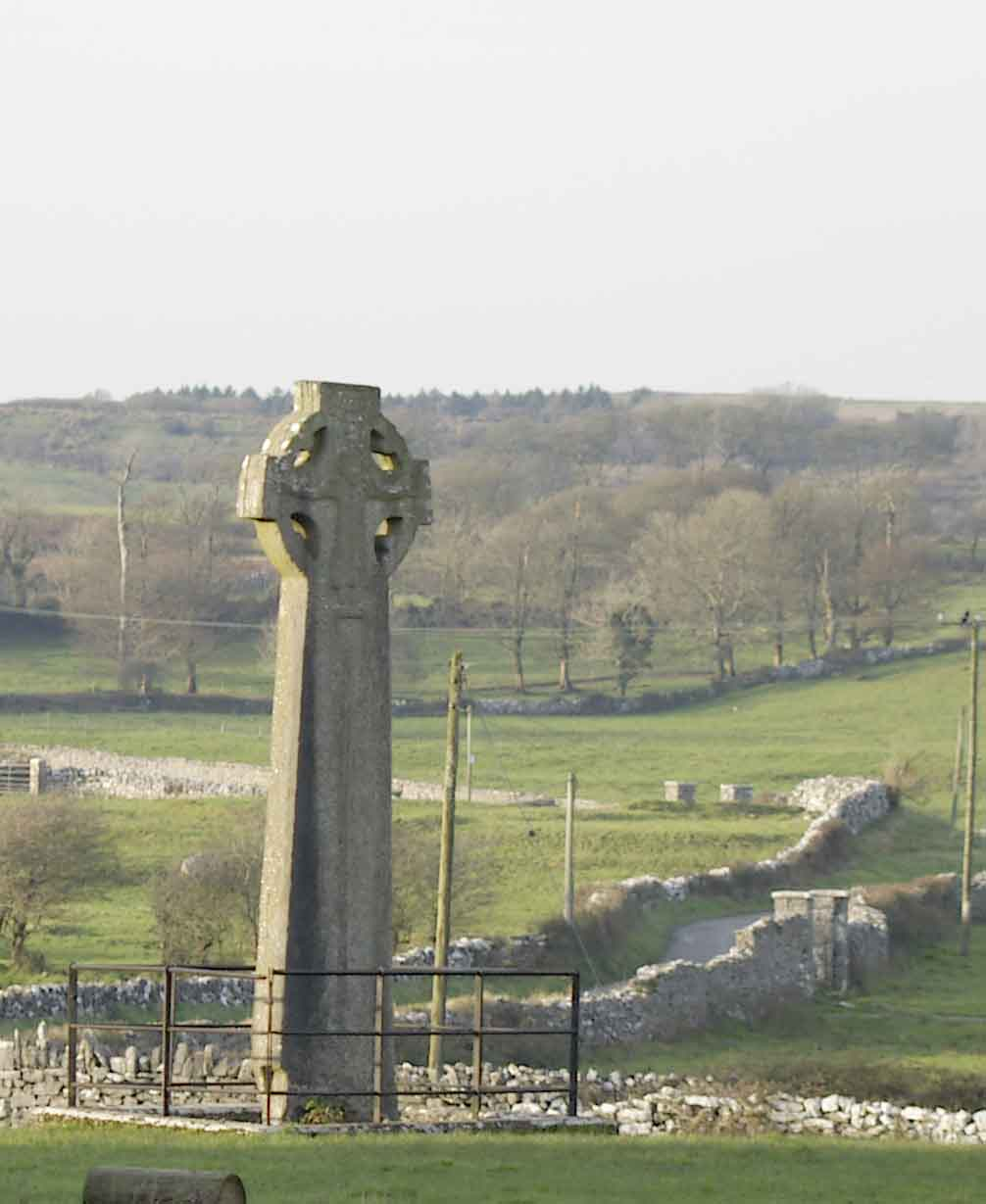
West cross (Kilfenora, Ireland)

Kildalton Cross (Islay, Scotland)

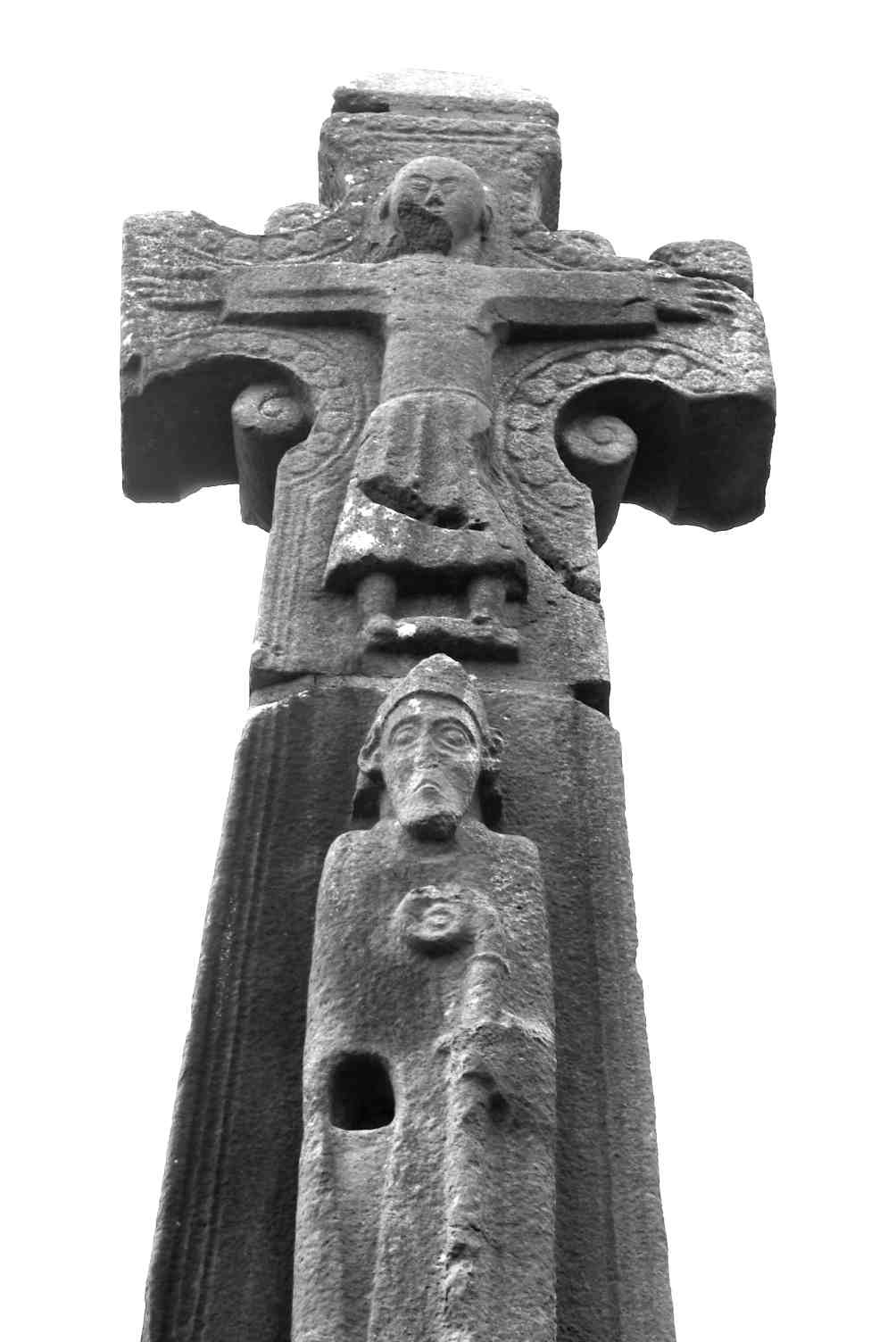
Saint Tola's Cross (Dysert O Dea, Ireland)

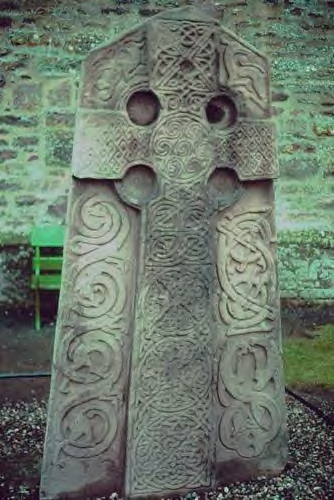
Kirkyard Stone, Class II Pictish cross-slab, Aberlemno, Scotland

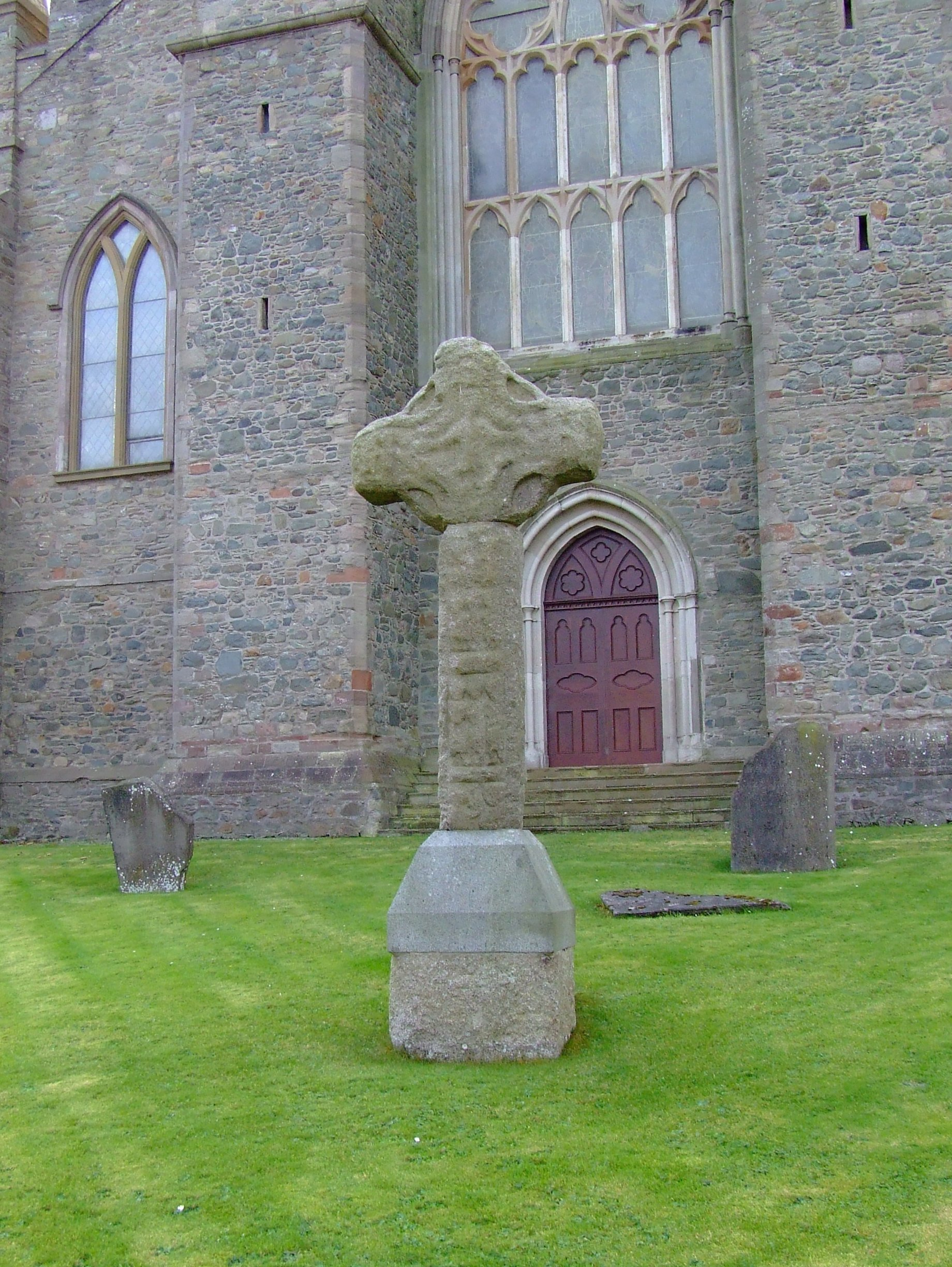
Downpatrick Cross (Downpatrick, Northern Ireland)

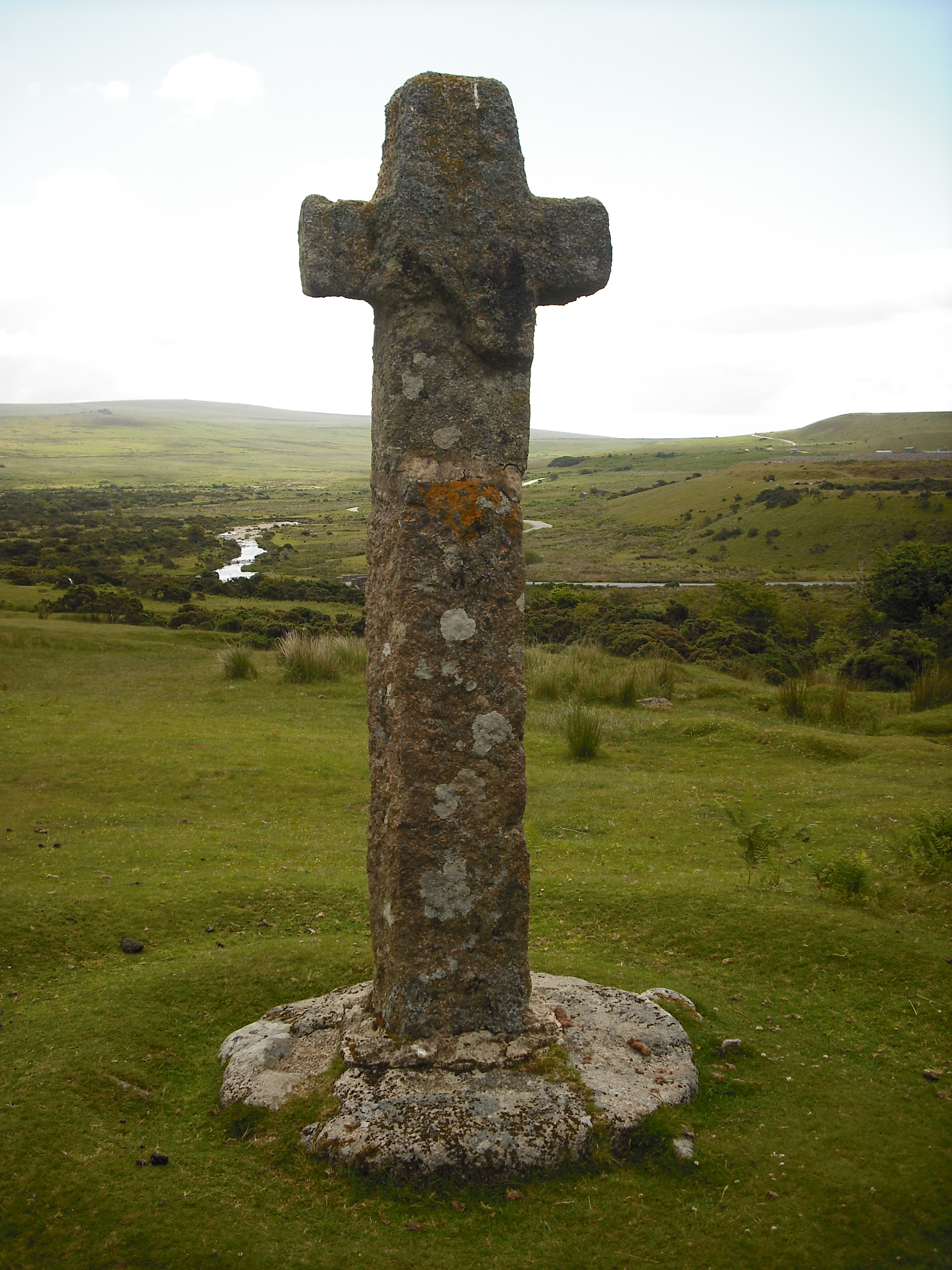
Cadover Cross, one of the Dartmoor crosses (Dartmoor, England)

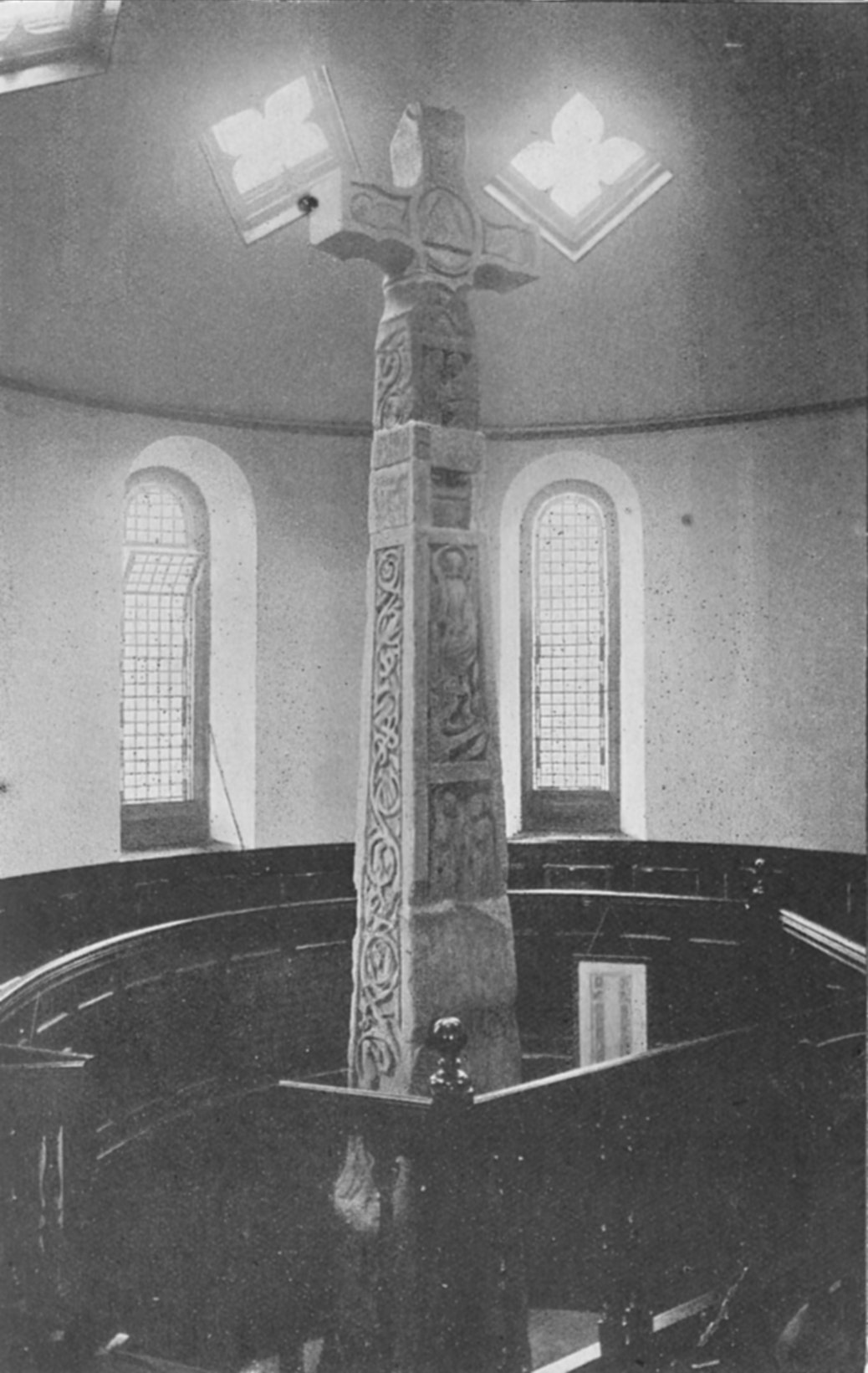
Ruthwell Cross (Ruthwell, Scotland)

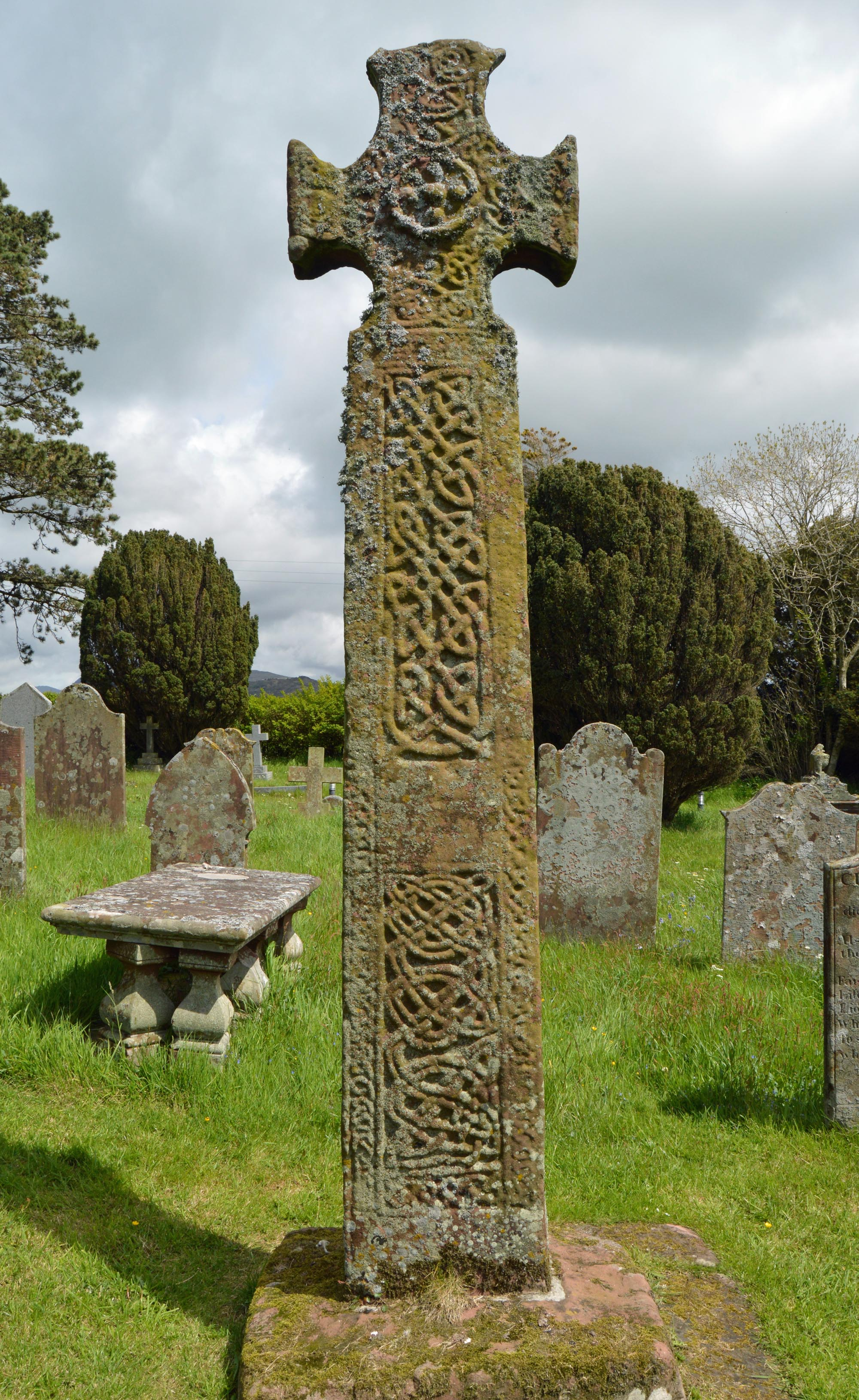
Irton, Cumbria

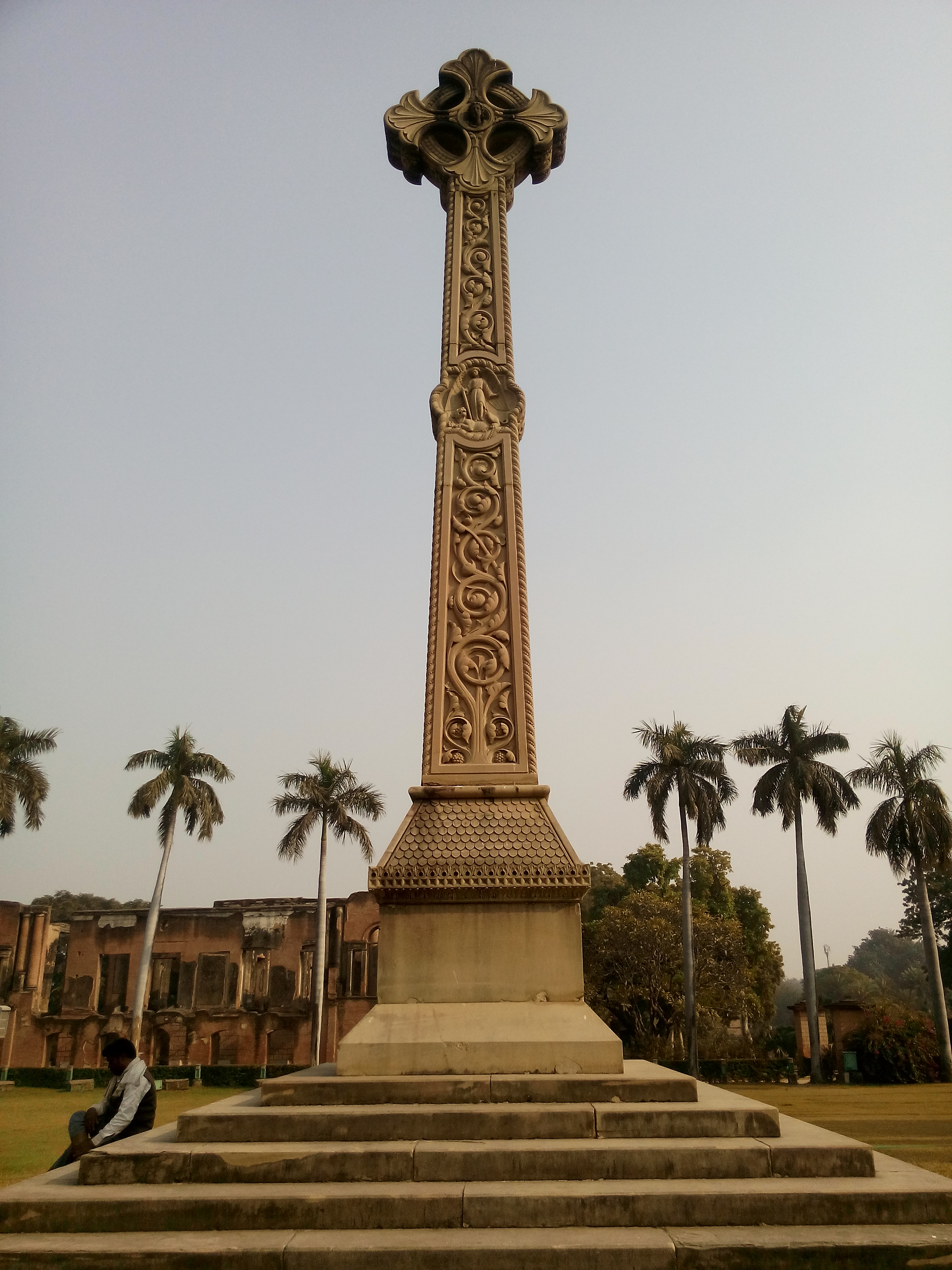
Sir Henry Lawrence Memorial in The Residency, Lucknow

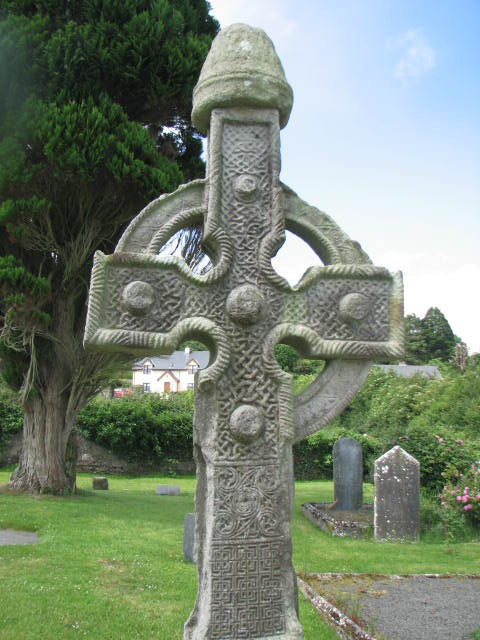
Ahenny high cross, North

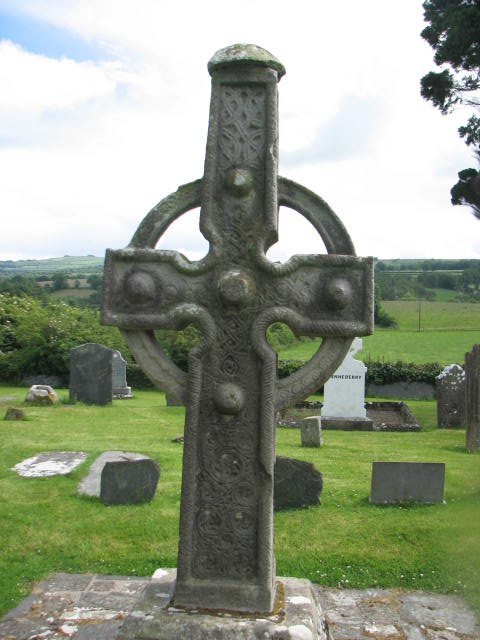
Ahenny high cross

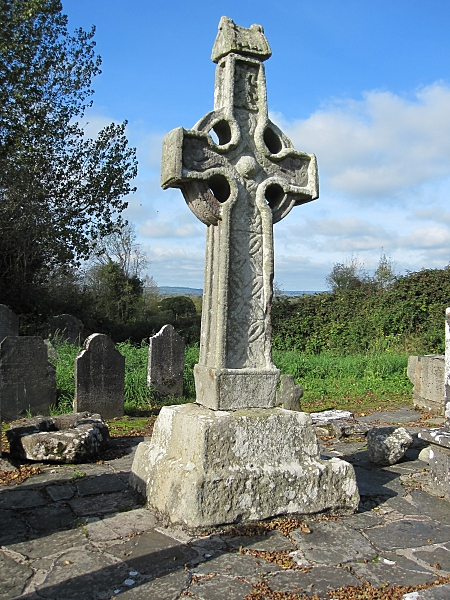
Killamery High Cross

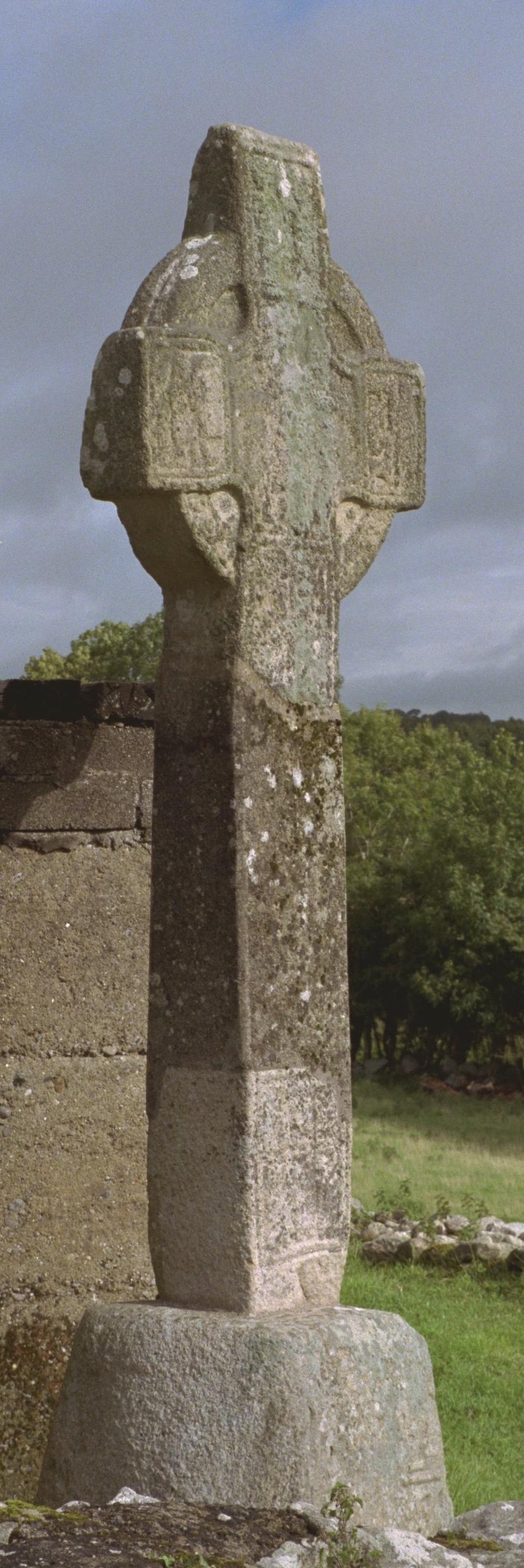
Ullard high cross

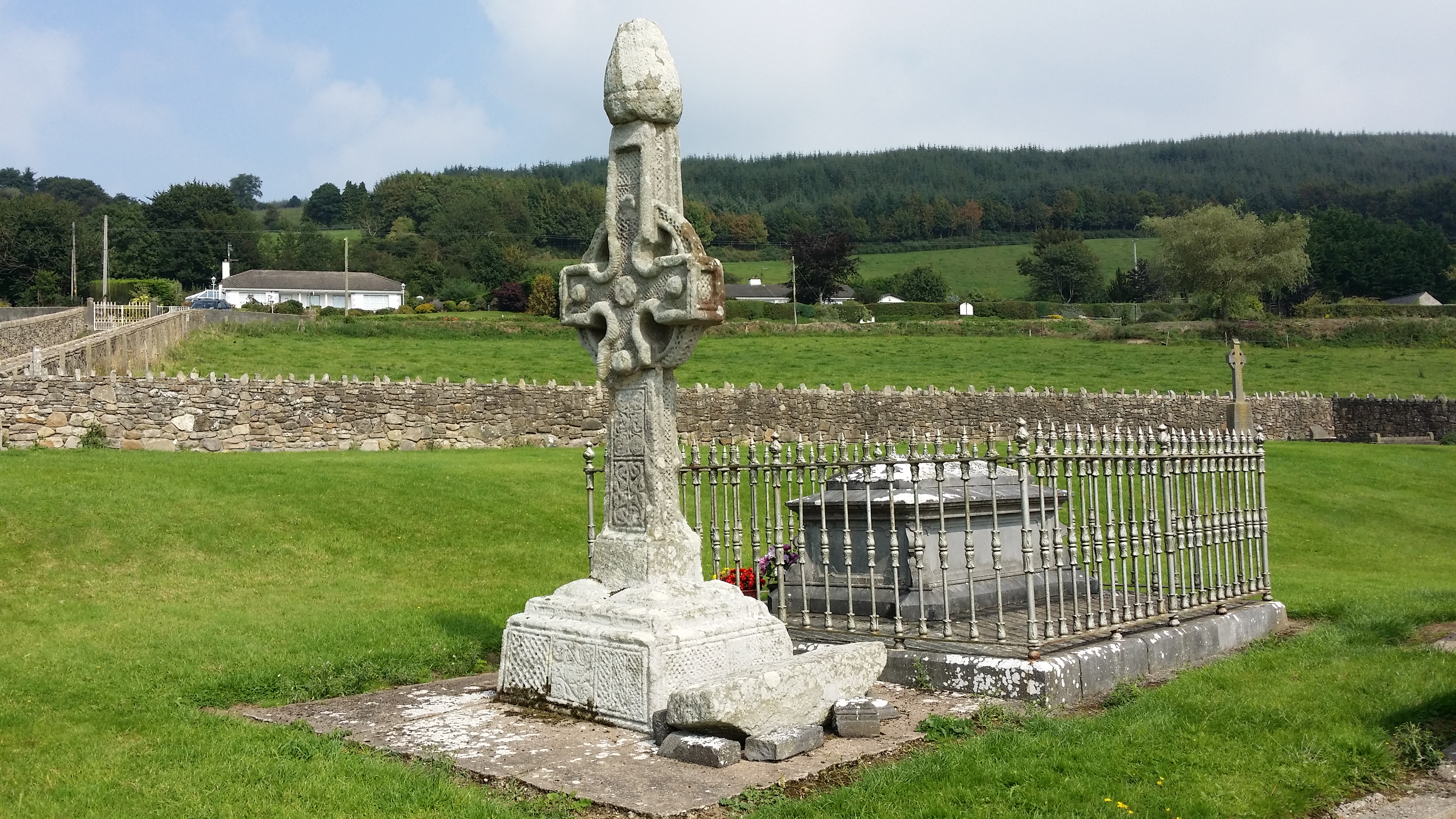
Kilkieran High Crosses

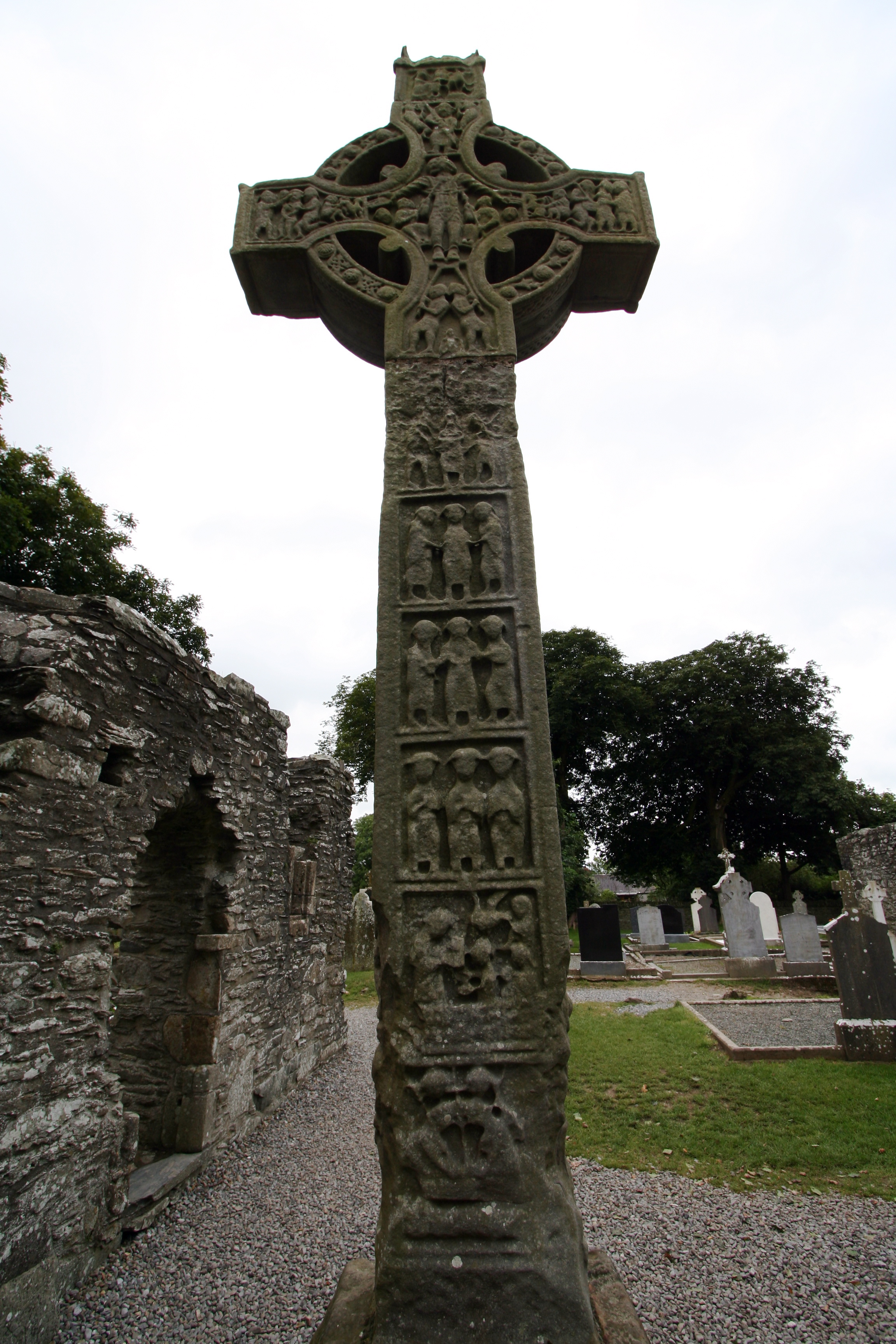
A high cross at Monasterboice in Ireland

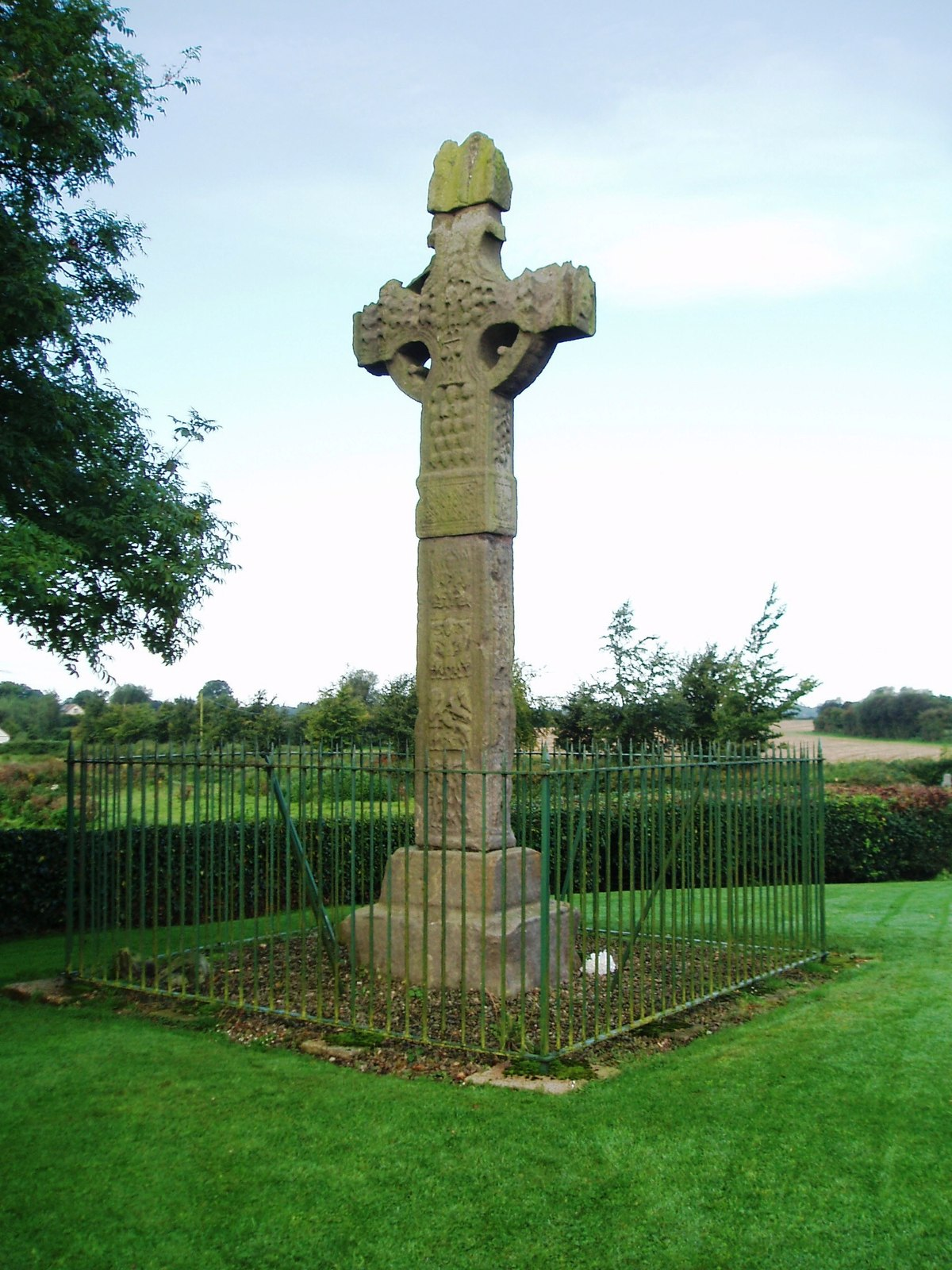
Ardboe High Cross

== See also ==
- Atrial cross – post-Conquest Mexico
- Khachkar – Armenian cross-stones
- Image stone – Pagan Scandinavian memorials
- Manx Runestones – hybrid Christian Viking Age relief slabs
- Celtic knot – decorative element common on High crosses
- Calvary (monument)
- Wayside cross
