= Killamery High Cross =

Irish monument

- Ardchros Chill Lamraí (Irish)
- The Maelsechnaill Cross; The Snake-Dragon Cross
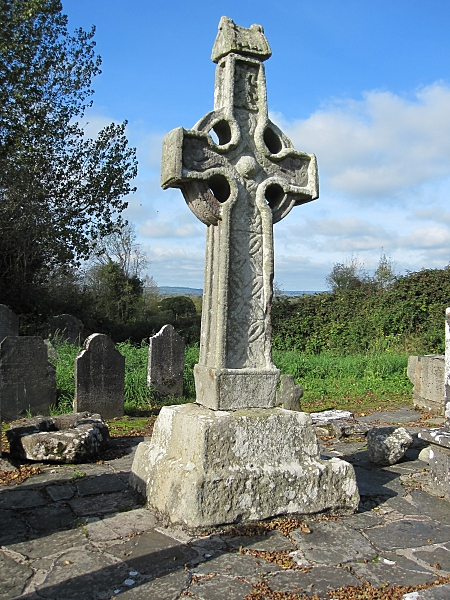

- Location within Ireland
- 52.475437°N 7.446012°W
- Type: High cross
- Location: Killamery, County Kilkenny, Ireland

History
- Built: 9th century AD

Site notes
- Height: 3.65 metres (12.0 ft)
- Area: Anner Valley

National monument of Ireland
- Official name: Killamery Cross
- Reference no.: 75

Killamery Cross is a 9th-century high cross and National Monument in Killamery, County Kilkenny, Ireland. It is located in the north of Killamery graveyard.

== History ==
A monastery was established at Killamery by St Gobhan, a disciple of Saint Fursey, in AD 632. The Killamery High cross is part of the western Ossory group of crosses, used as a model for many of the small high crosses sold across the world as an Irish symbol.

Locals formerly touched the cross's capstone to cure headaches.

== Description ==
The cross stands 3.65 metres (12.0 ft) high. It is richly sculptured on the shaft with marigold flowers carved on it. There is a boss in the middle of the wheel-head that is surrounded by interlacing snakes and, above the boss, an open-mouthed dragon, giving it the name of the Snake-Dragon Cross.

The western face has a sun swastika at the centre and also depicts Adam and Eve, a stag hunt and a chariot procession. On top of the cross is a gabled cap-stone. Noah and John the Baptist are depicted. On the base an inscription reads OR DO MAELSECHNAILL, "a prayer for Máel Sechnaill", who was high king of Ireland in 846–862.

=== Other artefacts ===
There is also a cross-slab of an earlier date the inscription OROIT AR ANMAIN N-AEDAIN, "Pray for the soul of Áedáin". Two bullaun stones can also be seen. There is also a holy well, St Goban's Well.
