= Hoy (surname) =

Hoy is a Scottish and Irish surname. The Irish origin of the name is derived from "Ó hEochaidh". Other surnames developed from "Ó hEochaidh" include: McKeogh, Kehoe, Hoey, Haughey, Haugh and Hough. Hoy is sometimes considered to be a variant of Haughey, and it is very common in Ulster. The first recording of the surname in Ireland is of one Elizabeth, daughter of Leuise and Martha Hoy, on 8 February 1646, at Holy Trinity (Christchurch), Cork.

People named Hoy include:

- Agnete Hoy (1914–2000), English potter
- Alexandra Hoy, Canadian jurist
- Andrew Hoy (born 1959), Australian equestrian
- Bettina Hoy (born 1962), German equestrian
- Bobby Hoy (born 1950), English former footballer
- Campbell Hoy (1893–1985), British flying ace
- Charles M. Hoy (1897–1923) American museum collector, active in Australia and China
- Chris Hoy (born 1976), Scottish track cyclist
- Col Hoy, Australian cricket umpire
- Cyrus Hoy (1926–2010), American English scholar
- Dummy Hoy (1862–1961), American Major League Baseball player
- Elizabeth Hoy, Irish author
- Ernest Charles Hoy (1895–1982), Canadian First World War flying ace and aviation pioneer
- Frank Hoy (1934–2005), Irish-born Scottish professional wrestler
- Garry Hoy, Canadian lawyer
- Henry Hoy (1855–1910) British locomotive engineer
- James Hoy, Baron Hoy (1909–1976), Scottish politician
- James Barlow Hoy (1794–1843), Irish-born politician
- Jen Hoy (born 1991), American soccer player
- Linda Hoy, British children's author
- Marie Hoy, Australian musician
- Marjorie Hoy (1941–2020), American entomologist and geneticist
- Mick Hoy (footballer), Irish footballer
- Mick Hoy (musician), Irish musician
- Pat Hoy (born 1950), Canadian politician
- Peter Hoy (born 1966), Canadian baseball player
- Phil Hoy (politician) (born 1937), American politician
- Phil Hoy (rugby union) (born 1987), English rugby union player
- Renate Hoy (1930–2024), German actress
- Robert Hoy (1927–2010), American actor
- Roger Hoy (1946–2018), English footballer
- Ron Hoy (1932–2016), Australian rules footballer
- Shirley Hoy, Canadian bureaucrat
- Thomas Hoy (botanist) (c. 1750–1822)
- Thomas Hoy (poet) (1659–1718), English poet and physician
- William Hoy (disambiguation)

== See also ==
- Cameron Van Hoy (born 1985), American actor
- Nikolaus van Hoy (1631–1679), Flemish Baroque painter
- Høy, another surname
