= Haughey =

- Haughey family coat of arms
- Pronunciation: /ˈhɔːhi/, /ˈhaʊi/
- Language: Gaelic

Origin
- Meaning: A mounted knight, a horseman (descendant of Eochaidh)
- Region of origin: Ireland

Other names
- Variant forms: McCaughey, McGaughey, McKeogh, Keogh, Kehoe, Haffey, Hoey, Hoy, Hughey

Haughey (Irish: Ó hEochaidh) is an Irish surname of noble origins. Spelling variations include: Hoey, McCaughey and McKeogh, among others.

The Haugheys are descendants of the ancient Dál Fiatach dynasty, rulers of Ulaid. According to Irish tradition the Dál Fiatach descend from Fiatach Finn mac Dáire, an alleged King of Ulster and High King of Ireland in the 1st century AD. In addition to a number of Scottish clans, as well as the British royal family (through the House of Dunkeld), their lineage extends to the Darini/Dáirine.

Notable bearers of the surname include:

- Charles Haughey, Taoiseach (Prime Minister) of Ireland
- Chris Haughey, baseball player
- Clare Haughey, MSP
- Denis Haughey, minister and MEP
- Edward Haughey, Baron Ballyedmond
- Mary Haughey, Baroness Ballyedmond
- Matthew Haughey, American programmer, web designer, and blogger
- Maureen Haughey, wife of Charles
- Pádraig Haughey, Irish Gaelic footballer
- Seán Haughey, Irish politician
- Siobhán Haughey, Hong Kong swimmer
- Thomas Haughey, American politician
- Tom Haughey, rugby player
- William Haughey, Baron Haughey
- Seán Ó hEochaidh

== See also ==
- Haughey (TV series), a series broadcast by RTÉ in 2005 about Charles Haughey
- Haughey's Fort
- Hoey
- McCaughey
- Kings of Ulster
- Dál Fiatach
- Ulaid
- Irish nobility
- Eochaid
