= Keogh =

List for surname of Irish origins

- Pronunciation: /kjoʊ/ KYOH /ˈkiːoʊ/ KEE-oh
- Language: Gaelic

Origin
- Meaning: 'son of Eochaidh'
- Region of origin: Ireland

Other names
- Variant forms: Mac Eochaidh, MacEochaidh, Keough, Keugh, K'Eogh, Kehoe

Keogh (usually pronounced /kjoʊ/ KYOH) is an Irish surname. It is a reduced Anglicized form of the Gaelic Mac Eochaidh or MacEochaidh, 'son of Eochaidh'. The personal name Eochaidh is in turn based upon the Gaelic word for horse (Old Irish ech).

Notable people with the surname include:

- Sir Alfred Keogh, British Army medical doctor
- Andrew Keogh (librarian), British-born American librarian
- Andy Keogh, Irish football player
- Barbara Keogh, British actress
- Sir Bruce Keogh, British professor of cardiac surgery
- Donna Keogh, British missing person
- Doreen Keogh (1926–2017), Irish-born actress
- Eamonn J. Keogh, Irish-born American computer scientist
- Edward Keogh, American politician
- Esmond Venner Keogh, Australian Army officer and medical scientist
- Estelle Venner Keogh, Australian nurse who served in World War I
- Eugene James Keogh, American politician
- Eustace Graham Keogh, Australian Army officer and military historian
- Fenton Keogh, Australian celebrity chef
- Helen Keogh, Irish politician
- Henry Keogh, Australian murderer
- James Keogh (disambiguation), several people
- James Gabriel Keogh (Vance Joy) Australian singer, songwriter and musician.
- John Keogh (disambiguation), several people
- Keira Keogh, Irish politician
- Kerrie Ann Keogh, singer performing as Kerri Ann
- Lesbia Venner Keogh, birth name of Australian poet, novelist and political activist Lesbia Harford (1891–1927)
- Liam Keogh, Scottish football player
- Matt Keough, American baseball player
- Michael Keogh (disambiguation), several people
- Myles Keogh, Irish soldier and American Civil War military officer
- Nina Keogh, Canadian puppet builder
- Patrick Keogh, New Zealand rugby player
- Peter Keogh (1929–2016), Irish journalist and sports administrator
- Richard Keogh, Irish football player
- Simon Keogh, Irish rugby player
- Theodora Keogh, American novelist
- Thomas Keogh, Irish bishop
- Tom Keogh (1922–1980), American fashion illustrator, graphic artist, and set and costume designer
- Trevor Keogh, Australian football player
- William Keogh, Irish politician and judge

== See also ==
- Kehoe (surname)
- Keoghan (surname)
- Keohane (disambiguation)
- Keough (surname)
- McKeogh
- McKeough (disambiguation)
