= Kehoe (disambiguation) =

Kehoe is an Irish clan name.

Kehoe may also refer to:

- Kehoe Field, American athletic venues
- Kehoe Cup, an Irish hurling competition

== See also ==
- Senator Kehoe (disambiguation)
- Keogh (disambiguation)
- Keoghan (surname)
- Keohane (disambiguation)
- Keough (disambiguation)
- McKeogh
- McKeough (disambiguation)
