= Keough =

Keough may refer to:

- Keough (surname)

== Fictional characters ==
- Joe Keough, in a novel by Robert J. Randisi
- Keough, in film Dark_Blue
- Keough/Haze, in anime Ragnarok the Animation
- "Robby" Keough, in film Outbreak

== Education ==
- Bishop Keough Regional High School
- Keough Hall, Notre Dame
- Keough School of Global Affairs, Notre Dame
- Seton Keough High School

== Other ==
- Keough Award

== See also ==
- Kehoe (disambiguation)
- Keogh (disambiguation)
- Keoghan (surname)
- Keohane (disambiguation)
- McKeogh
- McKeough (disambiguation)
