= Kehoe =

Kehoe, originally spelled MacKehoe (from Irish Mac Eochaidh 'son of Eochaidh', a personal name based on each 'horse'), is an Irish surname that stems from several distinct septs in Ireland.

The most notable branch were from southeastern Ireland in the province of Leinster and are descended from Brandub mac Echach, King of Leinster, in the 6th century AD. This branch were the Chief Filí of Leinster up until the 17th century and inaugurated the Kings of Leinster upon their stone called Leac Mhic Eochadha ("Eochaidh's flagstone").

Another unrelated and separate branch, descends from King Domnall Mór Ua Cellaigh of the O'Kellys of Uí Maine, who died in 1221.

Many of their descendants have emigrated to America and have spread throughout that part of the world. The name is spelled in a variety of ways, however the most common are Kehoe, Keogh and Keough. In Ireland the Kehoe version is used most often in and around County Wexford while Keogh is more common throughout the rest of the country.

== People named Kehoe ==
- Agnes Kehoe (1874–1959), American politician
- Alice Beck Kehoe (born 1934), American anthropologist
- Andrew Kehoe (1872–1927), American mass murderer and school bomber
- Bob Kehoe (1928–2017), American footballer
- Brendan Kehoe (1970–2011), Author and software developer
- Brian Kehoe (born 1982), American male fashion model
- Bryan Kehoe, American musician, member of M.I.R.V., Les Claypool's Fearless Flying Frog Brigade, Duo de Twang
- Chevie Kehoe (born 1973), American white supremacist convicted of 3 murders and other violent felonies
- Christine Kehoe (born 1950), politician from California
- Frank Kehoe, American diver and water polo player
- Harry Kehoe (born 1990), Irish hurler
- Jack Kehoe (1934–2020), American actor
- James J. Kehoe (1863–1909), New York state senator 1905–1906
- James N. Kehoe (1862–1945), American politician
- James W. Kehoe (1925–1998), American lawyer and judge
- Jennifer Kehoe (born 1983), British skier and army officer
- Jim Kehoe (1918–2010), American university administrator
- John Kehoe - multiple people
- Justin Kehoe (born 1980), Irish professional golfer
- Kevin Kehoe (hurler) (born 1991), Irish hurler
- Kevin Kehoe (politician), American politician
- L. Paul Kehoe (born 1938), New York politician and judge
- Michael Kehoe (1899–1977), 16th president of the Gaelic Athletic Association
- Mike Kehoe (born 1962), 58th governor of Missouri
- Nicholas Kehoe (1943–2022), U.S. Air Force lieutenant general
- Patrick Kehoe, Irish politician
- Paudie Kehoe (born 1990), Irish hurler
- Paul Kehoe (born 1973), Irish politician
- Robert A. Kehoe (1893–1992), toxicologist and apologist for the use of lead as an additive in gasoline
- Richie Kehoe (born 1986), Irish hurler
- Rick Kehoe (born 1951), Canadian hockey player
- Sally Kehoe (born 1986), Australian rower
- Scott Kehoe (born 1964), American football player
- Tim Kehoe (1970–2014), American author and inventor
- Timothy Kehoe (born 1953), American macroeconomist
- Toddy Kehoe (1918–2024), Canadian politician, philanthropist and disability rights activist
- Walter Kehoe (1870–1938), US Congressman from Florida

== See also ==
- Keogh (surname)
- Keoghan (surname)
- Keohane (disambiguation)
- Keough (surname)
- McKeogh
- McKeough (disambiguation)
