= Hoey =

- Hoey family coat of arms
- Language: Gaeilge

Origin
- Meaning: "descendant of Eochaidh (pronounced Owey or Hoy)"
- Region of origin: Ireland

Other names
- Variant forms: Haughey, McCaughey

Hoey is an Irish surname. Spelling variations include: O'Hoey, Haughey, McCaughey, Hoy and McKeogh, among others. The original Irish spelling is Ó hEochaidh.

The Hoeys are descendants of the ancient Dál Fiatach dynasty, rulers of the Ulaid and former kings of Ulster. They trace their descent from Fiatach Finn mac Dáire, a King of Ulster and High King of Ireland in the 1st Century AD.

Hoey is also a surname found in Cambodia and Indonesia, particularly for people of Chinese descent.

== Notable people with Hoey as a surname ==
- Allen Hoey (1952–2010), American poet, novelist, and literary critic
- Aoife Hoey (born 1983), Irish bobsledder
- Charles Ferguson Hoey (1914–1944), Canadian recipient of the Victoria Cross
- Clyde R. Hoey (1877–1954), American politician in North Carolina
- Colleen A. Hoey, American diplomat
- Dennis Hoey (1893–1960), British film and stage actor
- Evelyn Hoey (1910–1935), American singer and actor
- Frances Sarah Hoey (1830–1908), Irish novelist
- Fred Hoey (1884–1949), American baseball broadcaster in Boston
- Fred Hoey (baseball manager) (1865–1933), American baseball manager in New York City
- Gary Hoey (born 1960), American guitarist, singer and songwriter
- Iris Hoey (1885–1979), British actress
- James Hoey (disambiguation), several people
- Josephine Hoey (1822–1896), Anglo-American stage actress
- Kate Hoey (born 1946), Northern Irish politician
- Kelly Hoey, American author
- Lori Hoey, English footballer
- Margaret Gardner Hoey (1875–1942), American political hostess
- Marty Hoey (1951–1982), American mountaineer
- Michael Hoey (disambiguation), several people
- Nicole Hoey, New Zealand television producer
- Rico Hoey (born 1995), American-Filipino professional golfer
- Rob Hoey (born 1980), English musician, actor, writer and comedian
- Robert Hoey (1883–1965), Canadian politician in Manitoba
- Una Raymond-Hoey (born 1996), Irish cricketer
- Rachel (Hoey) Hatton (born 1968), American Author

== See also ==
- Hoey, Saskatchewan, a hamlet in Canada
- Haughey
- Kings of Ulster
- Dál Fiatach
- Ulaid
