= Keogh (disambiguation) =

Keogh is an Irish surname.

Keogh may also refer to:

- Fort Keogh, a U.S. Department of Agriculture livestock and range research station
- Keogh plan, a type of pension plan for self-employed people in the U.S.

== See also ==
- Kehoe (disambiguation)
- Keoghan (surname)
- Keohane (disambiguation)
- Keough (disambiguation)
- McKeogh
- McKeough (disambiguation)
