= Kevin Kehoe =

Kevin Kehoe may refer to:

- Kevin Kehoe (hurler)
- Kevin Kehoe (politician)
