= Phil Hoy =

Phil Hoy may refer to:

- Phil Hoy (politician) (1937-2025), former Democratic member of the Indiana House of Representatives
- Phil Hoy (rugby union) (born 1987), English rugby union player
