= 2014 Haughey Air AgustaWestland AW139 crash =

Aircraft crash in 2014

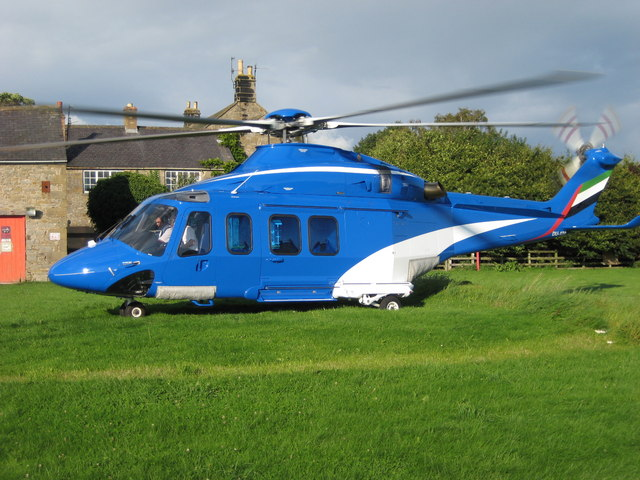
- An AgustaWestland AW139 similar to the accident aircraft

Accident
- Date: 13 March 2014
- Summary: Pilot error, spatial disorientation
- Site: Gillingham, Norfolk, United Kingdom; 52°28′40″N 1°32′38″E

Aircraft
- Aircraft type: AgustaWestland AW139
- Operator: Haughey Air
- Registration: G-LBAL
- Flight origin: Gillingham, Norfolk
- Stopover: Coventry Airport
- Destination: Rostrevor, County Down, United Kingdom
- Occupants: 4
- Passengers: 2
- Crew: 2
- Fatalities: 4
- Survivors: 0

On 13 March 2014, an AgustaWestland AW139 helicopter of Haughey Air crashed shortly after taking off at night in fog from Gillingham, Norfolk, United Kingdom, killing all four people on board. Among the victims was Edward Haughey, Baron Ballyedmond.

The subsequent investigation concluded that the flight crew may have been subject to somatogravic illusion due to the lack of external visual cues, inducing them to manoeuvre the aircraft into the ground instead of climbing away.

== Accident ==
The aircraft crashed at about 19:26 hrs UTC, shortly after taking off from Gillingham Hall, Gillingham, Norfolk, for Rostrevor, County Down, via Coventry Airport. An eyewitness to the accident stated that the helicopter came down at a 45° angle. The front of the aircraft was severely damaged in the crash. The location was at Ordnance Survey Grid Reference TM407925. At the time of the accident, weather conditions were foggy. All four people on board were killed; both crew and both passengers. Lord Ballyedmond was one of the passengers. The bodies of the victims were removed from the wreckage during the afternoon of 14 March.

The Norfolk Constabulary asked the Police Service of Northern Ireland for assistance with their investigations into the accident. Norbrook Laboratories, owned by Lord Ballyedmond, was also assisting the police with their enquiries. The site was formally handed over to Air Accident Investigation Branch (AAIB) investigators on 14 March. The Norfolk police stated that they were satisfied that there were no suspicious circumstances surrounding the accident. On 15 March, investigators dismantled the remains of the rotor blades and removed the tail of the aircraft in preparation for the removal of the wreck. The fuselage of the helicopter was loaded onto a lorry that day. It was taken to the AAIBs headquarters at Farnborough, Hampshire on 16 March. The AAIBs field investigators were assisted by personnel from the Norfolk Fire and Rescue Service, Royal Air Force and Royal Navy. Following the accident, the police closed a number of roads around the crash site. The last road closure was lifted at 09:25 on 17 March.

== Aircraft ==
The accident aircraft was an AgustaWestland AW139, msn 31421, registration G-LBAL. The aircraft was built in Italy in 2012 and registered in the United Kingdom to Haughey Air on 18 September 2012. Haughey Air was owned by Edward Haughey, Baron Ballyedmond. It was the sole aircraft purchased from AgustaWestland by Haughey Air. Lord Ballyedmond had initiated legal proceedings in September 2013 against AgustaWestland over safety concerns relating to oil leaks and rotor blade issues, as well as problems with the aircraft's communication and navigation systems.

== Investigation ==
The Air Accidents Investigation Branch (AAIB) opened an investigation into the accident. AgustaWestland assisted the AAIB in their enquiries. The aircraft's data recorders were recovered from the wreckage on 15 March 2014. A Special Bulletin published by the AAIB on 4 April revealed that there had been no mechanical failure with the helicopter and that it had not contacted any object between taking off and the crash site. The final report into the accident was originally scheduled to be published around March 2015. It was published on 8 October 2015. The investigation found that there was no mechanical failure with the aircraft. The crew were found not to have used checklists when operating the helicopter. The cause of the accident was pilot error, with spatial disorientation due to somatogravic illusion a major factor.

An inquest into the deaths of the four victims was opened on 20 March at Norwich Coroner's Court. After hearing that all four people died from head and chest injuries sustained in the accident, the inquest was adjourned until 24 July. The inquests concluded in January 2016, with verdicts of accidental death being returned against all four victims. During the inquest, the Coroner demanded that the AAIB release to her the recordings from the Cockpit Voice Recorder, imposing two fines of £100 each on the Chief Inspector of Accidents at the AAIB. The matter was referred to the High Court, where it was stated that only the High Court had the power to demand such disclosure of evidence. The fines were overturned.
