= Coogan =

Coogan is a surname of Irish origin; it comes from the Irish Mac Cogadháin originating in Kilkenny and may refer to:

== People ==
- Amanda Coogan
- Brian Coogan, American musician
- Dan Coogan (1875–1942), American baseball player and coach
- Fintan Coogan (disambiguation)
- Gwynneth Coogan
- Jackie Coogan (1914–1984), American actor
- James J. Coogan
- Keith Coogan, American actor
- Kevin Coogan (1952–2020), American journalist and author
- Mark Coogan, American coach and retired track athlete.
- Michael D. Coogan, American biblical scholar
- Pat Coogan (born 2002), American football player
- Richard Coogan, American actor
- Robert Coogan (1924–1978), American actor
- Robert P. Coogan (1922–2015), American naval officer
- Robert Coogan (priest) (1929–2025), Australian Anglican priest
- Scot Coogan, American musician
- Steve Coogan (born 1965), English actor
- Tim Pat Coogan

== Bar ==
- Coogan's

== See also ==
- Coogan’s (disambiguation)
- California Child Actor's Bill, known as the Coogan Act
- Cogan
- Geoghan and variants (Geoghean, Gaughen, Googan, et al.)
- Keoghan
