= Eochaid =

Eochaid or Eochaidh (earlier Eochu or Eocho, sometimes anglicised as Eochy, Achaius or Haughey) is a popular medieval Irish and Scottish Gaelic name deriving from Old Irish ech "horse", borne by a variety of historical and legendary figures.

== Variations ==
Old Irish	Modern Irish	Hiberno-English	Scottish Gaelic	Scottish English
Eochaid	Eochaidh	Eochy	Eachann	Hector

== List ==
- Eochaid mac Eirc, mythological king of the Fir Bolg in the 16th or 20th century BC
- Eochaid Ollathair, also known as The Dagda, mythical king of the Tuatha Dé Danann, said to have ruled Ireland in the 15th or 18th century BC
- Eochaid Faebar Glas, legendary High King of Ireland of the 13th or 15th century BC
- Eochaid Étgudach, legendary High King of Ireland of the 12th or 15th century BC
- Eochaid Mumho, legendary High King of Ireland of the 12th or 15th century BC
- Eochaid Apthach, legendary High King of Ireland of the 9th or 10th century BC
- Eochaid Uaircheas, legendary High King of Ireland of the 8th or 9th century BC
- Eochaid Fiadmuine, legendary High King of Ireland of the 8th or 9th century BC
- Eochaid mac Ailella, legendary High King of Ireland of the 6th or 8th century BC
- Eochaid Ailtleathan, legendary High King of Ireland of the 3rd or 5th century BC
- Eochu Feidlech, legendary High King of Ireland of the 1st or 2nd century BC
- Eochaid Airem, legendary High King of Ireland of the 1st or 2nd century BC
- Eochaid Gonnat, legendary High King of Ireland of the 3rd century AD
- Eochaid Mugmedon, semi-historical High King of Ireland of the 4th century AD
- Eochaid Iarlaithe (died 666), king of the Cruthin or Dál nAraidi in Ireland
- Eochaid Buide, historical king of Dál Riata in the 7th century AD
- Eochaid mac Domangairt, historical king of Dál Riata in the 7th century AD
- Eochaid mac Echdach, historical king of Dál Riata in the 8th century AD
- Eochaid mac Áeda Find, spurious king of Dál Riata in the 8th century AD
- Eochaid, son of Rhun, historical king of Strathclyde (or perhaps of the Picts) in the 9th century AD
- Eochaid Muinremuir, father of Erc of Dalriada and grandfather of Fergus Mór
- Dallan Forgaill, Eochaid Dallan Forgall, Saint and Poet 530 - 598

Two legendary Irish High Kings were called Rothechtaid, which appears to mean "Eochaid's wheels"

== Fiction ==
- The name Eochaid was used by Rutland Boughton for the king in his opera The Immortal Hour in 1914.
- In Dungeons & Dragons 4th edition, in Dragon Magazine #381 Eochaid was used as an example patron for a fey pact warlock. It is described as a mixture of a fey humanoid and animal shapes, while the art shows a humanoid with fur and horns, green twines forming the arms, trees forming its legs and the roots forming its toes.
- In the 2022 video game Elden Ring, "Eochaid" is a mentioned location and former home of the character "Elemer of the Briar". A collectable weapon "Regalia of Eochaid" also hails from the fictitious domain.
