= Lugaid Lámderg =

High King of Ireland

Lugaid Lámderg ("red hand"), son of Eochaid Uaircheas, was, according to medieval Irish legend and historical tradition, a High King of Ireland. The Lebor Gabála Érenn says he reigned jointly with Conaing Bececlach, ruling the southern half of the island while Conaing ruled the north, after he killed the previous southern ruler, Conaing's brother Eochu Fíadmuine, while Keating and the Four Masters say he deposed Conaing when he killed Eochu and ruled the whole island. He ruled for seven years, after which Conaing killed him and became High King of the whole island. The Lebor Gabála synchronises Lugaid's reign with those of Artaxerxes I (465–424 BC) and Darius II (423–404) of Persia. The chronology of Keating's Foras Feasa ar Éirinn dates his career to 616–609 BC, that of the Annals of the Four Masters to 839–832 BC.

Preceded by Eochu Fíadmuine and Conaing Bececlach	High King of Ireland; LGE 5th century BC; FFE 616–609 BC; AFM 839–832 BC; With: Conaing Bececlach	Succeeded by Conaing Bececlach
