= Penny Severns =

American politician

Member of the Illinois Senate from the 51st district
- In office 1987–1998
- Preceded by: James H. Rupp
- Succeeded by: Kevin Kehoe

Personal details
- Born: January 21, 1952 Decatur, Illinois
- Died: February 21, 1998 (aged 46) Decatur, Illinois
- Party: Democratic
- Domestic partner: Terry Mutchler (1993-1998)
- Education: Southern Illinois University
- Profession: Politician

Penny Severns (1952–1998) was a member of the Illinois Senate who represented the 51st Senate District from 1987 until her death in February 1998.

== Early life ==
Severns was born January 21, 1952, in Decatur, Illinois. After graduating from high school, she attended Southern Illinois University at Carbondale. While in college, at the age of 20, she was an alternate delegate to the 1972 Democratic National Convention, the then-youngest person elected to serve in that role. In 1974, she graduated with a bachelor's degree in political science and international relations.

Beginning in 1977, Severns served for two years as a special assistant to the administrator of the Agency for International Development. In this capacity she traveled to Nepal, India and Thailand, where she audited the United States' mission in those countries. She also represented the agency during the negotiations of the Camp David Accords. While in Washington, Severns also was a resident associate at the Smithsonian Institution. After leaving the State Department Severns took a job with Decatur-based Archer Daniels Midland.

In 1980 she ran for Congress against Edward Rell Madigan, but lost in a year that heavily favored the Republican Party. In her second attempt for public office, she won a seat on the Decatur City Council with the largest number of votes in the city's history at that time.

In 1983, Severns became the Democratic Party of Illinois's Central Committeewoman from Illinois's 20th congressional district, serving alongside Central Committeeman Vince Demuzio. In 1996, she was succeeded by Ellen Sinclair of Salem, Illinois.

== Illinois Senate ==
In 1986, she ran for Illinois Senate against 10-year incumbent James H. Rupp and won in one of the few upset races in the Illinois General Assembly that year. Though Rupp was the favorite, a combination of a media savvy candidate, a well-planned campaign strategy, keeping the focus on chosen issues and targeting of rural areas that Rupp had neglected were keys to the success of her campaign.

In the Senate, she was minority caucus whip. She also served as minority spokesperson of the Revenue Committee and on the Executive Committee and Legislative Audit Commission, all three of which were first-tier assignments. She rose to become the senior Democrat on another key committee, Appropriations, and was the first woman to be appointed a chief budget negotiator. She was viewed as an advocate for working families, breast cancer awareness and helping in the preservation of the Frank Lloyd Wright-designed Dana–Thomas House in Springfield. In 1989, Severns was selected from a nationwide group of legislators to participate as a fellow at Harvard University's Kennedy School of Government. Her work there earned her a position studying public policy with the National Conference of State Legislatures.

In late 1993, Severns announced that she was going to run for the Democratic nomination for Illinois Comptroller, but later switched to running for Lieutenant Governor of Illinois. After the primary election, she was paired with Dawn Clark Netsch, which is the first and only time in Illinois history two women were the top of the ticket. During the campaign, Severns was diagnosed with breast cancer. Ultimately, Netsch and Severns lost to Jim Edgar and Bob Kustra.

== Death and legacy ==
After the election her health continued to deteriorate, with the cancer spreading to her lungs and her skull. Despite this, she chose to run for Secretary of State in 1998. However, she was removed from the ballot after one of her opponents, Orland Park Chief of Police Tim McCarthy, challenged her petitions for not having the sufficient number of signatures. This narrowed the race to McCarthy and eventual nominee Jesse White, who went on to win the general election. Roughly a week after her removal from the ballot, Severns died of cancer. Former Macon County Board Chairman Kevin Kehoe was appointed her successor but lost election to a full term later that year to state Rep. Duane Noland of Blue Mound.

The Illinois Secretary of State's Summer Family Literacy program and the Penny Severns Breast and Cervical Cancer Research Fund are named in her honor. The portion of Interstate 72 between Springfield and Decatur is named in her honor. Her alma mater, Southern Illinois University, established four scholarships in her honor funded through a combination of state and private funding. Three of the scholarships went to students to cover one year of costs while a fourth scholarship was awarded to a Macon County resident.

At the time of her death, Severns was in a relationship with journalist Terry Mutchler; however, they kept the relationship secret. Mutchler was later the executive director of the Pennsylvania Office of Open Records. In November 2014 a book Mutchler wrote about her relationship with Severns, titled Under This Beautiful Dome, was published.

Party political offices
Preceded by James B. Burns	Democratic nominee for Lieutenant Governor of Illinois; 1994	Succeeded by Mary Lou Kearns
