= Conaing =

Conaing is an Irish language male name, it is derived from the Old English language word cyning, king, and is first attested in the 7th century. It might refer to:

- Conaing Bececlach, a legendary High King of Ireland
- Conaing mac Áedáin (died 622), a dynast in Dál Riata
- Conaing Cuirre (died 662), a king of Uisnech
- The Uí Chonaing, Kings of Knowth
