= McCahey =

McCahey is an Anglicized form of Irish Gaelic surname "Mac Eachaidh". Notable people with the surname include:

- Brendan McCahey (born 1976), Irish singer-songwriter
- Joe McCahey (1888–1917), American jockey
- Mike McCahey (born 1954), American fencer

== See also ==
- McGaughey
- McCaughey
