= Haffey =

Haffey is a surname. Notable people with the surname include:

- Chris Haffey (born 1985), American aggressive inline roller skater
- Frank Haffey (born 1938), Scottish footballer
- James Haffey (1857–1910), American politician

== See also ==
- Hafey
