= Keough (surname) =

Keough is a surname from Ireland. Notable with the name include:

- Donald Keough (1926–2015), American business manager
- Francis Patrick Keough (1890–1961), American religious leader
- Harry Keough (1927–2012), American soccer player
- Jake Keough (born 1987), American cyclist
- Jeana Keough (born 1955), American model and actress
- Joe Keough (1946–2019), American baseball right fielder
- Klancie Keough (born 1982), Australian musician
- Lavina Keough (born [?]), All-American Girls Professional Baseball League player
- Luke Keough (born 1991), American cyclist
- Mark Keough (born 1953), American religious leader and politician
- Marty Keough (born 1934), American baseball outfielder
- Matt Keough (1955–2020), American baseball pitcher
- Riley Keough (born 1989), American actress and model
- Shawn Keough (born 1959), American politician

== See also ==
- Kehoe (surname)
- Keogh (surname)
- Keoghan (surname)
- Keohane (disambiguation)
- McKeogh
- McKeough (disambiguation)
