= Coogan's (disambiguation) =

Coogan’s may refer to:

- Coogan’s, a defunct pub in the Washington Heights neighborhood of Upper Manhattan in New York City
- Coogan's Bluff, a promontory in the above neighborhood
- Coogan's Bluff (film), named in reference to the above promontory
- Coogan's Run, a 1995 UK TV series

== See also ==
- Coogan (disambiguation)
