= Cogan =

Cogan is a surname of Gaelic origin (not to be confused with the surname Kogan of Russian-Jewish origin). Notable people with the surname include:

- Alma Cogan (1932–1966), English singer
- Andrew Cogan, 17th-century agent of the English East India Company
- Barry Cogan (footballer) (born 1984)
- Barry Cogan (politician) (born 1936)
- Brian Cogan (born 1954)
- Charles Cogan (1928–2017), American academic and intelligence officer
- David G. Cogan (1908–1993), American ophthalmologist
- Dean Cogan (1826–1872), Irish priest and writer
- Fanny Cogan (1866–1929), American actress
- Frank Cogan (born 1944), Irish Gaelic footballer
- Henri Cogan (1924–2003), French actor and stuntman
- Henry Cogan, Canadian politician
- Kevin Cogan (born 1956), American Formula 1 driver
- Maggie Cogan (born 1943), American horse and carriage driver
- Patrick Cogan (1903–1977), Irish politician
- Philip Cogan (1750–1833), Irish composer
- Pierre Cogan (1914–2013), French cyclist
- Robert Cogan (1930–2021), American composer and music theorist
- Samantha Cogan (born 1997), Canadian ice hockey player for PWHL Toronto
- Sara Cogan, English actress
- Thomas Cogan (1736–1818), English physician and writer
- Tony Cogan (born 1976), American baseball player
- William H. F. Cogan (1823–1894), Irish politician
- William N. Cogan (1856–1943), American dentist, naval officer, and dean of Georgetown University School of Dentistry

== See also ==
- Cogan, Vale of Glamorgan, A suburb of Penarth in South Wales
  - Cogan railway station, serving Cogan, Vale of Glamorgan.
- Cogan House Township, Pennsylvania, a township in Lycoming County
  - Cogan House Covered Bridge in the township
- Cogan syndrome, a rare disorder
- Coogan
- Geoghan
- Keoghan
