= Delaware Valley Regional Planning Commission =

Regional planning agency in Pennsylvania

Agency overview
- Formed: 1965
- Jurisdiction: Philadelphia metropolitan area
- Headquarters: 190 N Independence Mall West, 8th Floor, Philadelphia, Pennsylvania 19106, U.S.
- Agency executive: Ariella Maron, Executive Director
- Website: www.dvrpc.org

Map
- A map of the nine counties in southeastern Pennsylvania and South Jersey covered by DVRPC

The Delaware Valley Regional Planning Commission (DVRPC) is the metropolitan planning organization for the Philadelphia metropolitan area. Created in 1965 by an interstate compact, DVRPC is responsible for transportation and regional planning in the greater Philadelphia area.

== History ==
=== 20th century ===
==== Regional Planning Federation of the Philadelphia Tri-State District ====
In 1928, the Regional Planning Federation of the Philadelphia Tri-State District, was formed as the first planning commission for the Delaware Valley region. The Federation issued its first regional plan in 1932 and was disbanded in 1941.

In 1955, Philadelphia's Urban Traffic and Transportation Board produced Plan and Program 1955. The Penn Jersey Transportation Study followed this agency, which was organized to resume regional planning and eventually evolved into the Delaware Valley Regional Planning Commission (DVRPC).

In 1967, the Delaware Valley Regional Planning Commission was established under the "Delaware Valley Urban Compact" to provide continuing, comprehensive, coordinated regional planning for the Delaware Valley Urban Area and to provide a variety of services designed to address regional issues and needs. The structure, authority, purpose, and administrative procedures of DVRPC were defined by the legislatures of both states via the compact.

The role of the DVRPC is to gather elected officials and government planners to improve transportation, promote smart growth initiatives, and protect the environment. The commission was first instituted as a regional planning agency in 1965 under a contract between Pennsylvania and New Jersey.

==== Regional Citizens Committee ====
In the mid-1970s, the Regional Citizens Committee (RCC) was formed as a result of a federal mandate; it was initially structured into three committees focusing on transportation, housing, and the environment.

In 1980, the three committees were merged into one, and since that time, the RCC has functioned as an advisory committee to the Board. In 1984, the RCC Chair was given a seat at the Board table in an advisory capacity.

The RCC was structured to fulfill three goals:

- To identify those members of key regional organizations who could convey the message heard at RCC meetings to other individuals, thus building a grassroots consensus for DVRPC initiatives;
- To review ongoing DVRPC activities and programs and provide input on public policy within the purview of DVRPC; and
- To work cooperatively with the Board and staff to implement the public participation requirements mandated by federal transportation legislation.

The RCC was originally composed of citizen members, advocates for special interests, and regional organizations.

DVRPC was subsequently designated as the Metropolitan Planning Organization (MPO) for its nine-county planning region in southeastern Pennsylvania and South Jersey, and retained this designation through the implementation of the 1991 Intermodal Surface Transportation Efficiency Act (ISTEA). ISTEA gave the commission an expanded transportation planning authority and responsibility, as defined in the USDOT Final Rules for Statewide Planning and Metropolitan Planning. Subsequent federal bills have continued and expanded this designation and responsibility.

The commission is governed by an 18-member board that establishes regional policy, defines committee duties, and adopts the annual work program. A 10-member executive committee oversees general operations and fiscal matters, including adoption of the annual budget.

=== 21st century ===
In February 2011, DVRPC unveiled "Eating Here: Greater Philadelphia's Food System Plan" and announced $500,000 in implementation grants at an event at Reading Terminal Market. Attendees included over 100 regional policy makers, farmers, preservation experts, hunger advocates, and small business owners. The plan is the result of a two-year collaborative effort to provide recommendations to increase the security and economic, social, and environmental benefits of the regional food system.

DVRPC also announced $500,000 in grants, made possible with funding from the William Penn Foundation. DVRPC Board Chair and Montgomery County Commissioner Joe Hoeffel presented "Plate of Distinction" Awards to seven local organizations that are already working to implement the recommendations outlined in the plan. These organizations are:

- The Common Market
- Fair Food
- Greensgrow Farms
- Metropolitan Area Neighborhood Nutrition Alliance (MANNA)
- Pennsylvania Association for Sustainable Agriculture (PASA)
- SHARE Food Programs
- Weavers Way Community Programs.

On July 19, 2011, the Pennsylvania Office of Open Records (OOR) determined that DVRPC was covered under the Pennsylvania Right-to-Know Law (RTKL) of 2008 and was therefore required to provide access to public records in its possession.

In response to several requests for information from the Pennsylvania Transit Expansion Coalition (PA-TEC), DVRPC previously argued that it was exempt from the state law, as it was a multi-state agency that did not perform any essential function, despite being funded almost entirely by taxpayers.

The OOR overruled DVRPC's assessment, holding that the RTKL eliminated the requirement that an entity perform an essential governmental function to be considered an agency. The OOR had further determined that members of PA-TEC, despite repeated attempts to obtain information from DVRPC, had not engaged in disruptive behavior, which the DVRPC stated had "a chilling effect" on citizen participation because they "involve e-mails exchanged with leaders of the RCC, who aren't employees of the commission."

The OOR ordered the DVRPC to comply with PA-TEC's request and release all documents the group had requested; the DVRPC initially waived its right to appeal the decision in the Commonwealth Court.

The ruling had serious consequences for the DVRPC's operations. Documents produced by the DVRPC were presumed public, so the commission could refuse to release them only under certain narrow exceptions spelled out in the RTKL. PlanPhilly.com called the decision "a landmark ruling."

The DVRPC eventually appealed the ruling to the Commonwealth Court of Pennsylvania, which overturned the OOR decision on October 3, 2012, on the basis that the planning organization "is not a 'commonwealth agency' under the Law because it does not perform an essential governmental function."

In February 2011, RCC President John Pawson was instructed by the DVRPC Executive Committee to step down; he died the following February.

On March 8, 2011, members of the RCC were notified by Committee Chairwoman Aissia Richardson that voting rights for members were being revoked on the Action Task Force subcommittee, which votes and comments on transportation projects (Transportation Improvement Program [TIP] Action Items). They had been redistributed to selected members chosen by the RCC executive committee and unknown DVRPC employees.

A records request under Pennsylvania State Law by PA-TEC revealed that the reassignment of voting rights was undocumented and done out of public view. This occurred after months of RCC deliberations over SEPTA parking garage projects, commuter rail expansion, and prioritization of transportation funding. Despite several attempts, including a formal right-to-know request, DVRPC did not produce any records documenting the suspension and redistribution of voting rights at the RCC's Action Task Force, or alterations to the federally mandated Public Participation Plan.

On May 17, 2011, the meeting opened with Aissia Richardson reading a statement about diversity, Nazi concentration camps, and insisting her name be spelled and pronounced correctly each time she was addressed (demanding repeatedly "say my name, say it for the record!"). This was followed with a series of personal attacks against members of PA-TEC by vice chairman Jim Richardson, telling one member "go screw yourself!" and another "the next time this comes up in any context, you and I are gonna talk about it on the sidewalk!" Former RCC member Tom McHugh later commented at the January 27, 2012 DVRPC Board Meeting that PA-TEC members were "villainized by the executive committee."

In November 2011, the DVRPC disbanded the RCC and replaced it with a citizens group. Membership was composed of appointees chosen by member counties and others selected by DVRPC staff.

== Organization and leadership ==
In April 2006, Barry Seymour was selected by the DVRPC Board as the new executive director, succeeding John Coscia, who had served as executive director since 1982.

In December 2022, Ariella Maron was selected by the DVRPC Board as the new executive director, succeeding Barry Seymour, who had served as executive director since 2006.

DVRPC produces a long-range plan every four years. The current long-range plan is titled Connections, the Long-Range Plan for a Sustainable Future.

DVRPC currently employs approximately 120 full-time staff.

== Counties served ==
In South Jersey:

- Burlington
- Camden
- Gloucester
- Mercer

In Pennsylvania:

- Bucks
- Chester
- Delaware
- Montgomery
- Philadelphia
