= Terry Mutchler =

American lawyer, writer and journalist

Terry Mutchler is an American attorney and writer. She was formerly a journalist and public servant in Pennsylvania. As a journalist, she won several awards for her reporting and was Associated Press' Bureau Chief in New Jersey and Alaska. She later became an attorney, and was appointed the first executive director of the newly established Pennsylvania Office of Open Records. Her memoir, Under This Beautiful Dome: A Senator, A Journalist, and the Politics of Gay Love in America, was a finalist for the Lambda Literary Award for Lesbian Memoir or Biography.

== Career ==
Mutchler began her career as a journalist, reporting for Allentown, Pennsylvania's local newspaper, The Morning Call after completing a degree in journalism from the Bellisario College of Communications at Pennsylvania State University. She went on to report for the Associated Press, covering politics in Pennsylvania, New Jersey, Alaska, and Illinois. She was the first woman to be appointed the Associated Press' Statehouse Correspondent for that region, in 1993. She was later transferred, becoming the Associated Press' Bureau Chief for Atlantic City, New Jersey and then Juneau, Alaska. During her time as a journalist, she won several Keystone Awards, a Pennsylvania honor for reporting, and was awarded the Associated Press' state nominee for Young Writer of the Year.

Mutchler attended John Marshall School of Law in Chicago after retiring from the Associated Press, earning a J.D. She clerked in the Supreme Court of Illinois, worked in the Executive Office of the President during the Clinton administration, and was a speechwriter for the Illinois Attorney-General.

In 2008, she was appointed as the first director of the newly established Pennsylvania Office of Open Records. In 2012, Mutchler publicly stated that Pennsylvania's Right to Know law should apply to Penn State University, and that having it applied might have resulted in an earlier disclosure of the Penn State child sex abuse scandal. Although Mutchler received bipartisan support for a second term, she was not reappointed, and joined private practice at the end of her term. During her term as director, the Office of Open Records expanded and doubled its rate of disclosures between 2009 and 2013, and was widely praised as improving public access and transparency in Pennsylvania.

In 2019, Mutchler represented State Senator Tarah Toohil who accused Republican State Senator Nicholas Miccarelli III of domestic abuse and assault, and obtained a restraining order against Miccarelli for her. A House investigation reportedly found those allegations to be credible and stripped Miccarellli of his privileges. In 2021, Mutchler represented Pennsylvania State Senator Katie Muth in a lawsuit against Pennsylvania Public School Employees' Retirement System, which is currently being investigated by the Federal Bureau of Investigation for allegations of corruption in relation to land purchases and statements of profit.

In 2016, Common Cause presented her with the Bob Edgar Public Service Achievement Award for her work in improving public accountability and transparency. In 2019, she was inducted into the National Freedom of Information Coalition's State Open Government Hall of Fame for her work in establishing government transparency, as a journalist and as a government official. In 2021, Pennsylvania State University recognised her with the Alumni Fellow Award.

== Personal life ==
In 2014, Mutchler published a memoir, Under This Beautiful Dome: A Senator, A Journalist, and the Politics of Gay Love in America (Seal Press) which detailed her long-term, secret relationship with Illinois Senator Penny Severns, who died of cancer in 1998. The two had kept their relationship secret due to social stigma against same-sex relationships. The book was a finalist for the Lambda Literary Award for Lesbian Memoir or Biography in 2015.
