= Stanley and Alder Carrs, Aldeby =

UK Site of Special Scientific Interest

Coordinates: 52.478°N 1.581°E

- Site of Special Scientific Interest
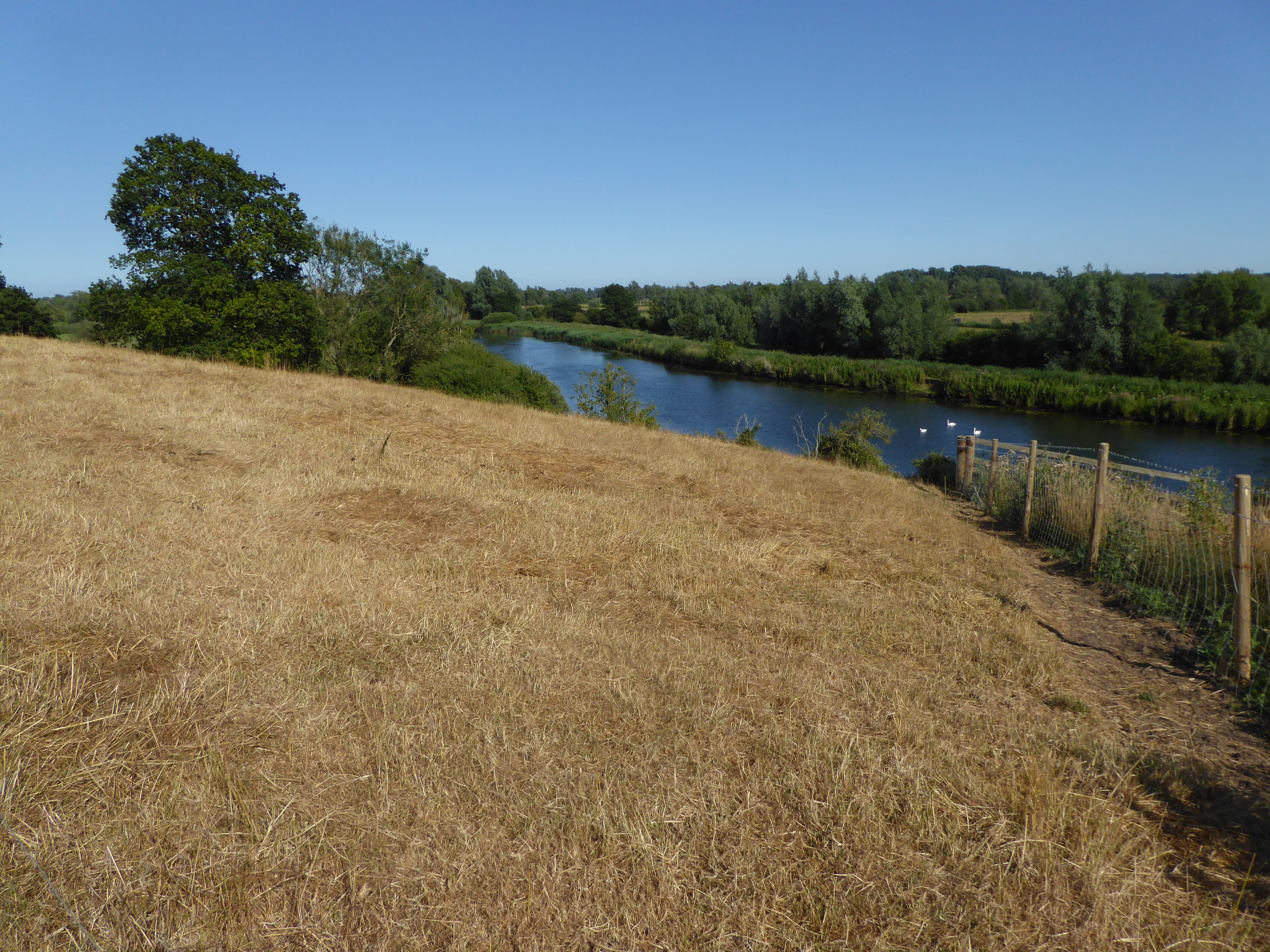
- Location of Stanley and Alder Carrs, Aldeby.
- Area of search: Norfolk
- Grid reference: TM 433 927
- Interest: Biological
- Area: 42.7 hectares (106 acres)
- Notification date: 1986
- Location map: Magic Map

Stanley and Alder Carrs, Aldeby is a 42.7-hectare (106-acre) biological Site of Special Scientific Interest east of Gillingham in Norfolk, England. It is part of the Broadland Ramsar site and Special Protection Area, and The Broads Special Area of Conservation.

Most of this site is alder carr woodland next to the River Waveney, which is often flooded. It has a diverse insect fauna. There are also areas of open fen with plants including common reed, reed canary grass and hemp-agrimony.

The site is private land with no public access.
