= Hough =

Hough may refer to:

- Hamstringing, or severing the Achilles tendon of an animal
- the leg or shin of an animal (in the Scots language), from which the dish potted hough is made
- Hough (surname)

== Communities ==
=== United Kingdom ===
- Hough, Alderley Edge, a location in Cheshire
- Hough, Argyll and Bute, a location on the island of Tiree, Scotland
- Hough, Cheshire, a village near Crewe in north-west England
- Hough End, an area of Chorlton-cum-Hardy, Manchester, England
  - location of Hough End Hall
- Hough Green, a residential area of the town of Widnes, England
  - Hough Green railway station
- Hough-on-the-Hill, a village in Lincolnshire, north-east England
- Thornton Hough, a village in Merseyside, England

=== United States ===
alphabetically by state

- Hough Springs, California, an unincorporated community in Lake County
- Hough, Cleveland, a neighborhood in Ohio
  - location of the Hough Riots
- Hough, Oklahoma, an unincorporated community in Texas County
- Hough, Vancouver, a neighborhood in Washington

== Geographical features ==
- Hough Glacier, in Antarctica
- Hough Peak, in Essex County, New York, U.S.
- Houghs Creek (Delaware River tributary), in Bucks County, Pennsylvania, U.S.
- Houghs Neck, a peninsula in Norfolk County, Massachusetts, U.S.

== Schools ==
- Hough Graduate School of Business, part of the University of Florida
- Thistley Hough Academy, in Staffordshire, England

== Other ==
- Hough Priory, in Hough-on-the-Hill, Lincolnshire, England
- Hough transform, a technique in digital image processing
- Hough Windmill, in Swannington, Leicestershire, England
