= Irish Brigade (World War I) =

Attenpt to form military unit of Irish POWs during WW1

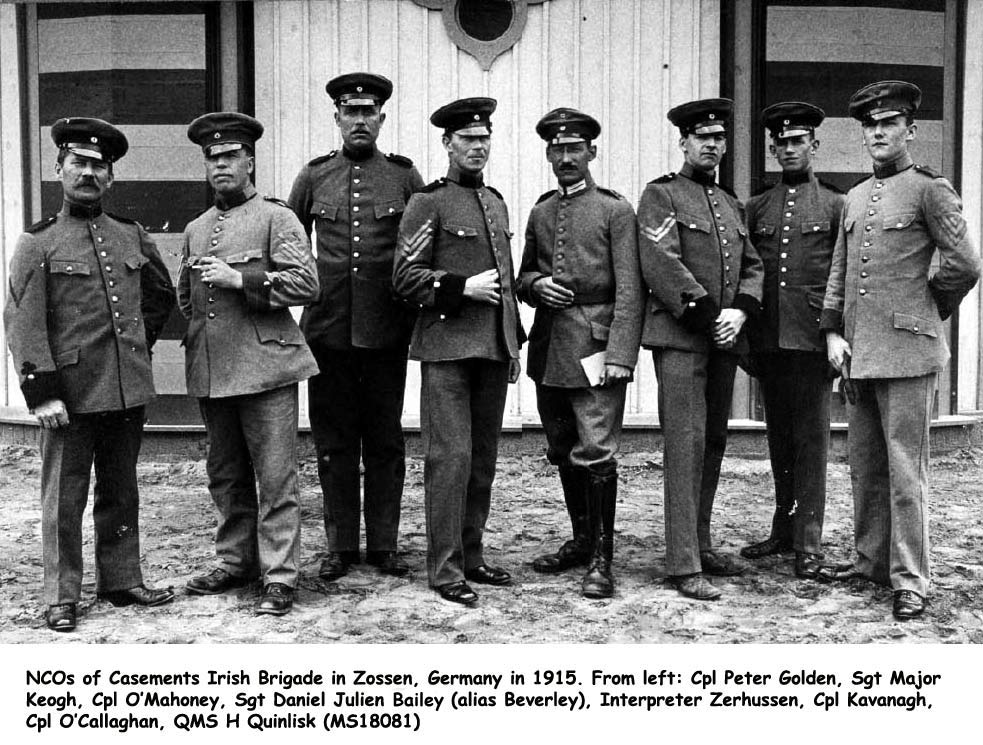
NCO's of Casements Irish Brigade in Zossen (1915).

The "Irish Brigade" was an attempt by Sir Roger Casement to form an Irish nationalist military unit during World War I among Irishmen who had served in the British Army and had become prisoners of war (POWs) in Germany. Casement sought to send a well-equipped and well-organised Irish unit to Ireland, to fight against Britain, in the aim of achieving independence for Ireland. Such an action was to be concurrent with the ongoing war between Britain and Germany, thereby providing indirect aid to the German cause, without the ex-POWs fighting in the Imperial German Army itself.

== Formation ==
Casement was a former British diplomat, who had since devoted himself to the cause of Irish independence. He was inspired by John MacBride's success in forming the Irish Transvaal Brigade, during the Boer War. Casement traveled to Germany by way of the United States, shortly after the outbreak of World War I, with the aid of the Irish Republican Brotherhood and the Clan na Gael.

On 27 December 1914, Casement signed an agreement in Berlin, authorizing the brigade, with German Secretary of State Arthur Zimmermann. Only 56 Irishmen volunteered and they were brought together at a POW camp at Limburg an der Lahn. At its peak the brigade's Irish personnel consisted of:

1 Feldwebel-Leutnant (lieutenant sergeant or commissioned sergeant-major Robert Monteith who was maybe later promoted to a German major in the brigade),
1 Feldwebel (colour sergeant),
1 Vizefeldwebel (quartermaster sergeant),
3 Sergeanten (sergeants),
3 Korporale,
3 Lane Korporale (lance corporals) and
43 Gemeine (privates). The brigade received training in machine guns and were assigned German officers. They were attached to 203rd Brandenburg regiment and divided into two companies comprising ten Machine-Gun-Corps. They also received their own Irish Brigade uniform that was a standard German army uniform, adapted to include Irish symbols such as the shamrock and the harp.

A military brigade usually has over 3,000 members, indicating its target size and the scale of Casement's optimism and failure.

The intended Brigade was part of a much larger German plan which involved attempts to utilise Indian independence activists, German Americans, and Irish nationalists to destabilise the British Empire.

Casement eventually became disillusioned with the German government. He came to believe that the Germans saw the brigade only as a potential diversion, assisting the Central Powers, and that they did not take Irish independence seriously. When he discovered that German material aid for the planned Easter Rising of 1916 was less substantial than expected, he abandoned the brigade and returned to Ireland by German submarine, in an effort to persuade the Irish Volunteers to cancel the rising. Shortly after his arrival on the coast of County Kerry, Casement was arrested, and later charged with treason against the United Kingdom and executed. A former sergeant in the Brigade, Daniel Bailey (alias Beverley), was also arrested and turned King's Evidence against Casement, detailing his recruiting activities in Germany. By the time the 1916 rising took place, the Irish Brigade was defunct.

A detailed account of Casement's Irish Brigade in Germany was written by Michael Keogh, recruiting officer and Sergeant Major in the Irish Brigade in Germany and Casement's adjutant. The book was officially launched on 15 July 2010.

A release of prisoners' statements by the UK National Archives in 2014 suggested that most of the 56 volunteers were persuaded by John Nicolson, an Irish-American priest, and not by Casement.

== See also ==
- Friesack Camp – attempt to raise a similar body of volunteers during World War II
