= Edward Haughey, Baron Ballyedmond =

Entrepreneur and politician (1944–2014)

The Right Honourable The Lord Ballyedmond OBE FRCVS

Member of the House of Lords
- Lord Temporal
- Life peerage 18 June 2004 – 13 March 2014

Senator
- In office 13 December 1994 – 12 September 2002
- Constituency: Nominated by the Taoiseach

Personal details
- Born: Edward Enda Haughey; 5 January 1944 Dundalk, County Louth, Ireland
- Died: 13 March 2014 (aged 70) Gillingham, Norfolk, England
- Cause of death: Helicopter crash
- Party: Fianna Fáil (Ireland); Conservative (Britain); Ulster Unionist Party (Northern Ireland)
- Spouse: Mary Young (m. 1972)
- Children: 3
- Occupation: Entrepreneur, politician, activist

Edward Enda Haughey, Baron Ballyedmond, OBE, FRCVS, (5 January 1944 – 13 March 2014) was an Irish-British entrepreneur and politician.

With an estimated personal wealth of €780 million (£650 million/USD1,078 million), he was the second-richest person in Northern Ireland, ninth-richest in Ireland and was joint 132nd-richest person in the United Kingdom.

== Career ==
Edward Haughey was born in Kilcurry, north of Dundalk, County Louth, Ireland in 1944 and educated by the Christian Brothers in Dundalk.

Having emigrated to the United States and begun a career in the pharmaceutical industry, Haughey moved to Northern Ireland starting Norbrook Group as a pioneer in contract manufacture of products for multinationals. Instead of merely being content to process products from other companies Norbrook developed proprietary lines and international manufacturing and distribution.

Properties owned by Haughey include Ballyedmond Castle in Rostrevor, Corby Castle in Cumbria, Gillingham Hall in Norfolk, Belgrave Square #9, London (a 6-storey townhouse purchased in 2006 for about £12m, restored during the following three years) and a Georgian house on Dublin's Fitzwilliam Square.

== Politics ==
On 18 June 2004, Haughey was created a life peer as Baron Ballyedmond, of Mourne in the County of Down and sat in the British House of Lords on behalf of the Ulster Unionist Party, before switching to the Conservative Party. He donated £50,000 to the Conservative Party in 2010. He was previously appointed to the Irish Senate in 1994, and was the third politician in nearly 80 years to have sat in both countries' upper houses, after the Earl of Longford in the 1940s and the Earl of Iveagh in the 1970s.

He was appointed an Officer of the Order of the British Empire (OBE) in the 1986 New Year Honours, and in 2008 was awarded an honorary Fellowship of the Royal College of Veterinary Surgeons. On 1 July 2008 Haughey was made an Honorary Doctor of Science (DSc) by the University of Ulster in recognition of his contribution to the development of the international pharmaceutical industry. Tax-deductible donations have been made by Norbrook to the UU. The same year, he was also made an Honorary Fellow of the Royal Society of Chemistry (HonFRSC), "in recognition of his unparalleled contribution to the chemical sciences".

Haughey served as an Honorary Consul to the Republic of Chile.

Haughey was the Mid Ulster Branch patron of the National Malaya and Borneo Veterans Association.

== Family ==
In 1972, Haughey married solicitor Mary Gordon Young. They had three children; Caroline, Edward and James.

== Death ==
On 13 March 2014, it was reported that Edward Haughey had been one of four killed in a helicopter crash in Norfolk, England, while travelling in an AgustaWestland AW139 type helicopter. An Air Accidents Investigation Branch report concluded that the pilots had lost control of the aircraft in dense fog and at night. Colleague and site foreman Declan Small (a native of Mayobridge, County Down), and helicopter pilots Captains Carl Dickerson and Lee Hoyle were also killed.

He left a personal fortune in his will of £339 million.

== See also ==
- List of Northern Ireland members of the House of Lords
- Haughey
