= McKeough =

McKeough is a surname. Notable people with this surname include:

== People ==
- Darcy McKeough (born 1933), Canadian politician and businessman
- Dave McKeough (1863–1901), American baseball player
- Patrick McKeough (born ?), Canadian publisher, editor, author, and businessman
- Raymond S. McKeough (1888–1979), American politician
- Rita McKeough (born 1951), Canadian interdisciplinary artist, musician, and educator
- Stefanie McKeough (born 1991), Canadian ice hockey player

== See also ==
- Tom MacKeough (1922–1990), Canadian politician
- Kehoe (disambiguation)
- Keogh (disambiguation)
- Keoghan (surname)
- Keohane (disambiguation)
- Keough (disambiguation)
- McKeogh, a surname
