= Duane Noland =

American politician and lobbyist

N. Duane Noland (born September 12, 1956) is an American politician and lobbyist who served as a Republican member of the Illinois General Assembly first in the Illinois House of Representatives and later in the Illinois Senate.

== Biography ==
Born in Blue Mound, Illinois, Noland graduated from the public schools in Blue Mound, and attended the University of Illinois at Urbana–Champaign where he earned a Bachelor of Science degree in Agriculture Education and Economics. Professionally, he has been Vice President of Noland Farms and an agribusiness officer at Illinois National Bank of Springfield for four years.

On April 3, 1990, Noland was appointed to the Illinois House of Representatives to succeed Mike Tate who resigned to become executive director of the Illinois Association of Independent Insurance Agents. The district included all or portions of Macon, Christian, Cumberland, Shelby, and Moultrie counties in Central Illinois. While a member of the Illinois House, Noland served as Minority Spokesman for the Agriculture and Conservation Committee, as well as being seated on the following committees: Appropriations-Public Safety Committee, the Insurance Committee, and the Registration and Regulation Committee.

In the 1998 election for Illinois Senate, Noland defeated Democratic incumbent Kevin Kehoe, who had been appointed to replace the late Penny Severns. The Senate district he represented, located in Central Illinois, included all or parts of Macon, Christian, Piatt, Champaign, Coles, Cumberland, Moultrie, and Effingham.

He and his wife, Tina Beckett, have two sons and one daughter. As of 2017, Noland is the CEO of the Association of Illinois Electrical Cooperatives.
