= James H. Rupp =

American politician and businessman

Member of the Illinois Senate
- In office January 1977 – January 1987
- Preceded by: Robert McCarthy
- Succeeded by: Penny Severns

Personal details
- Born: May 17, 1918 Kearny, New Jersey, USA
- Died: September 30, 1998 (aged 80) Decatur, Illinois, USA
- Party: Republican
- Education: Monmouth College

James Henry Rupp Jr. (May 17, 1918 – September 30, 1998) was an American politician, businessman, and Republican member of the Illinois Senate from 1977 to 1987.

== Biographical sketch ==
James Henry Rupp Jr. was born in Kearny, New Jersey and graduated from Kearny High School in 1936. He did post-graduate work at Staunton Military Academy in 1937. Rupp received a bachelor's degree in business and economics from Monmouth College, Illinois, where he played football for the Fighting Scots. He served in the United States Navy during World War II and was commissioned a lieutenant commander. Rupp lived in Decatur, Illinois with his wife, Florence, and family and was the owner of an insurance agency.

In 1967, Rupp defeated incumbent Mayor Ellis Arnold in the primary election, and then defeated building contractor Roger Pogue in the general election. Rupp served as mayor of Decatur, Illinois from 1966 to 1976. After his election to the Illinois Senate, he was succeeded as mayor by Alderman Elmer Walton.

Rupp was elected to the Illinois Senate in the 1976 general election, defeating Democratic incumbent Robert McCarthy, also of Decatur. He served in the Senate 1977 to 1987. In 1986, Rupp was challenged for reelection to the Illinois Senate by Penny Severns. Though Rupp was the earlier favorite, a combination of a media savvy candidate, a well-planned campaign strategy, keeping the focus on chosen issues and targeting of rural areas that Rupp allegedly neglected were credited with the success of her campaign. It was one of the few upset races for the Illinois General Assembly that election cycle.

Rupp died in Decatur, Illinois on September 30, 1998. He is buried in North Fork Cemetery, Long Creek, Illinois.

== See also ==
- List of mayors of Decatur, Illinois
