= Senator Kehoe =

Senator Kehoe may refer to:

- Christine Kehoe (born 1950), California State Senate
- James J. Kehoe (1863–1909), New York State Senate
- Kevin Kehoe (Illinois politician), Illinois State Senate
- L. Paul Kehoe (born 1938), New York State Senate
- Mike Kehoe (born 1962), Missouri State Senate
- William Kehoe (1876–1932), California State Senate
