= Mary Haughey, Lady Ballyedmond =

British businesswoman (born 1947)

The Right Honourable The Lady Ballyedmond
- Born: Mary Gordon Young; December 1947 (age 78)
- Occupation: Businesswoman
- Spouse: Edward Haughey (m. 1972; died 2014)
- Children: 3

Mary Haughey, Baroness Ballyedmond (born December 1947) is an Irish and British billionaire heiress from Northern Ireland who is the deputy chairman of Norbrook Laboratories. She is the sixth richest person in Ireland, and the richest in Northern Ireland.

Born Mary Gordon Young in December 1947, she attended Newry High School where she was Head Girl. She then trained as a solicitor and was a part-time lecturer in law at Queen's University Belfast. In 1972, she married Edward Haughey, Baron Ballyedmond. Following his death in a helicopter crash on 14 March 2014, she inherited his wealth.

According to The Sunday Times Rich List in 2019 her net worth was estimated at £1.638 billion.

== Personal life ==
She has three children; Caroline is a practising barrister in London, while Edward (a former barrister) and James (a former medical doctor) are directors of Norbrook.
