= Geoghan =

Geoghan is a surname. Notable people with the surname include:

- Jim Geoghan, American television producer
- John Geoghan (1935–2003), key figure in the Roman Catholic sex abuse cases in Boston, Massachusetts in the 1990s and 2000s
- Lisa Geoghan (b. 1967), British actress best known for playing PC/CAD Officer Polly Page on The Bill

== See also ==
- Cogan
- Coogan
- Geoghegan
- Keoghan
