= Michael Keogh =

Michael Keogh may refer to:

- Michael Keogh (athlete) (born 1950), Irish middle-distance runner
- Michael Keogh (politician) (died 2001), nationalist politician and journalist in Northern Ireland
- Michael Keogh (soldier) (1891–1964), Irish soldier who served on both sides of World War I
