= Michael Hoey =

Michael Hoey may refer to:

- Michael Hoey (athlete) (born 1939), Irish Olympic athlete
- Michael Hoey (golfer) (born 1979), Northern Irish professional golfer
- Michael Hoey (linguist) (1948–2021), British linguist
- Michael A. Hoey (1934–2014), British author and film and television writer, director, and producer

== See also ==
- Michaël Van Hoey (born 1982), Belgian football player
