= John Keogh (disambiguation) =

John Keogh may refer to:

- John Keogh (1740–1817), Irish merchant and political activist
- John K'Eogh (1681–1754), Irish doctor of divinity and naturalist
- John Keogh (footballer) (born 1940), Irish soccer player
- John Keogh (RTÉ) (active on 1960s), Irish cultural personality
- John W. Keogh (1863 or 1864–1947), Illinois redistricting activist
