= Fintan Coogan =

Fintan Coogan may refer to:

- Fintan Coogan Snr (1910–1984), Irish Fine Gael politician, TD and senator
- His son Fintan Coogan Jnr (born 1944), also an Irish Fine Gael politician, TD and senator
