= William Hoy =

William Hoy may refer to:

- Dummy Hoy (William Ellsworth Hoy), American center fielder in Major League Baseball
- William Hoy (film editor), active since 1988 with over two dozen feature-film editing credits
- William Edwin Hoy, Protestant missionary and educator in Japan and China
- Will Hoy, English racing driver
