= John Kehoe =

John Kehoe may refer to:

- John Joseph Kehoe (1891–1967), politician in Ontario, Canada
- John Kehoe (Quebec politician) (born 1934), politician in Quebec, Canada
- John Kehoe (died 1949), New Zealand police officer killed in the line of duty
- John Ortiz-Kehoe, convicted in 1997 for a murder that was documented on the television show Forensic Files
- John "Black Jack" Kehoe, one of the Molly Maguires who was convicted of murder in 1877, pardoned in 1979

== See also ==
- Jack Kehoe (1934–2020), American actor
