= Gillingham Hall =

House in Gillingham, South Norfolk, England, UK

Coordinates: 52.47503°N 1.55189°E

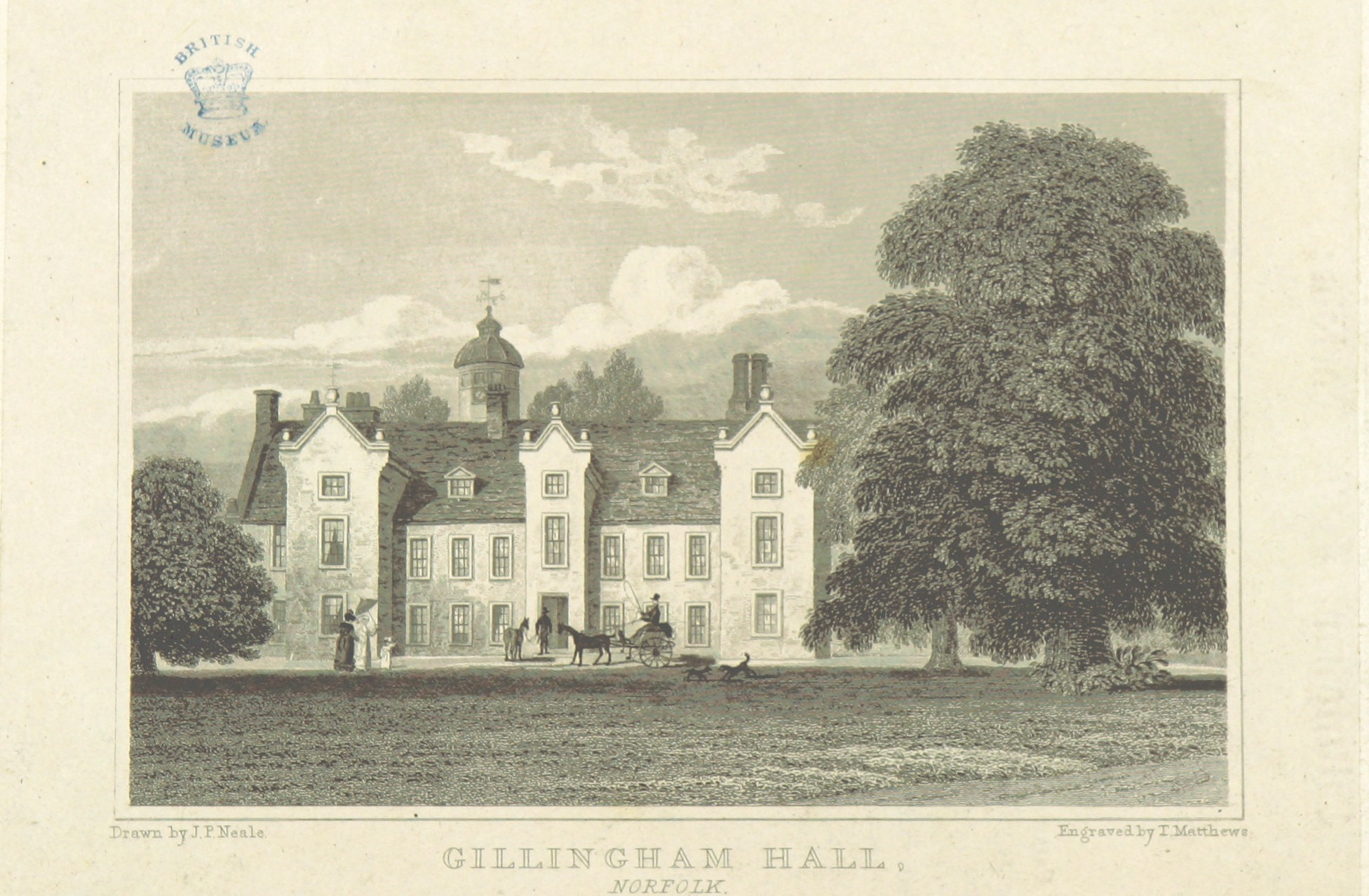
Gillingham Hall, Norfolk (1818)

Gillingham Hall is a Jacobean manor house in the village of Gillingham, Norfolk, England. It is a Grade II* Listed Building.

The house has 10-bedrooms and was built in the early 16th century. It was altered and enlarged in the 18th and 19th centuries, including an 18th-century walled garden, and 19th century additions to the stable block.

== History ==
16th century: The Gillingham Estate was founded by Sir Nicholas Bacon, Lord Keeper of the Great Seal in the reign of Queen Elizabeth I. Gillingham Hall was built by his son, Sir Francis Bacon, Lord Chancellor and the first baronet of Gillingham, in the early 1600s. Gillingham Hall remained in the family, always passing through the female line, until it was sold in 2000.

19th century: Gillingham Hall passed to Admiral Henry Eden in 1849 when he married Elizabeth Harriet Georgiana Beresford, daughter of Lord George Beresford. They had no children, so on Elizabeth's death, the Hall was inherited (much to his surprise) by John George Kenyon, Elizabeth's nephew. Kenyon, a passionate follower of John Henry Newman, had converted to Roman Catholicism in 1870, fought as a Papal Zouave against Garibaldi and was made a Knight of the Order of St Gregory the Great and Papal Chamberlain to Pope Leo XIII and to Pope Pius X. Kenyon immediately set about supporting the Benedictine Catholic mission at nearby Beccles. He helped to build two churches locally: Our Lady of Perpetual Succour, Gillingham (a private Chapel of Ease which remains in family ownership) and St Benet's Minster, Beccles.

21st century: In 2000, Gillingham Hall was sold to Hassanain al-Nakeeb, a hotel owner and breeder of Arabian horses.

In 2005, al-Nakeeb put Gillingham Hall up for sale. It was bought by Edward Haughey, Baron Ballyedmond. On his death in 2014, the house passed to his son Edward Haughey, the current owner.
