= Achaius =

Achaius may refer to:

- John Capellanus (died 1147), Bishop of Glasgow nicknamed "Achaius"
- Achaius, one of the legendary kings of Scotland
- Achaius, a genus of wasp within the family Ichneumonidae

== See also ==
- Achaeus (disambiguation)
