= Alexandra Hoy =

Canadian judge

Alexandra Hoy was the associate chief justice of the Court of Appeal for Ontario. She is a graduate of the Osgoode Hall Law School and was previously appointed to the Ontario Superior Court of Justice.
