= John K'Eogh =

John K'Eogh (c.1681–1754) was an Irish Doctor of Divinity and naturalist. John Keogh was chaplain to Baron Kingston at Mitchelstown. He wrote Botanologia Universalis Hibernicaor, or a general Irish Herbal Cork, 1735, a herbal, or book about medicinal plants, written in Manx (not Irish but related), phonetic English, and Latin, Zoologia Medicinalis Hibernica or, a Treatise on Birds, Beasts, Fishes, Reptiles or Insects known and propagated in this Kingdom, and Vindication of the Antiquities of Ireland Dublin, 1748, in which he gives an account of his family.

He was the son of John K'eogh whose original family name was Mac Eochaidh (16--, Cloonceagh, Limerick-) also a Doctor of Divinity and author of Hebrew, Latin and Greek texts.
