= McCaughey =

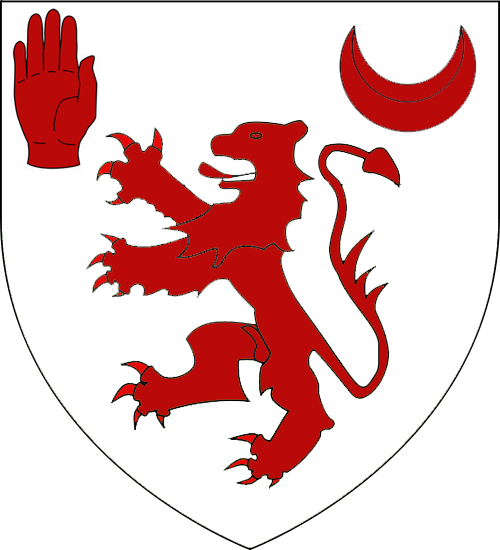
- McCaughey family coat of arms
- Pronunciation: McCoy or McKay
- Language: Gaeilge

Origin
- Meaning: "Son of Eochaidh (pronounced Owey)"
- Region of origin: Ireland

Other names
- Variant forms: Haughey, Hoey, MacCaughey

McCaughey is an Irish surname. Spelling variations include: McHaughey, MacCaughey, McGaughey and O'Coffey, among others. The anglicisation comes from the original “Mac Eochaidh”.

The McCaugheys are descendants of the ancient Dál Fiatach dynasty, rulers of the Ulaid, modern day Ulster. The surname McCaughey is an anglicised form of the Irish surname “Mac Eochaidh”, meaning “son of Eochaidh” (son of the horseman) or “descendant of Eochaidh” (descendant of the horseman). The personal name “Eochaidh” was common in early medieval Ireland and appears among the ruling families of Ulaid, particularly the Dál Fiatach, the dynasty associated with eastern Ulster - particularly County Down. They trace their descent from Fiatach Finn mac Dáire, a King of Ulster and High King of Ireland in the 1st century AD.

== People ==
- Billy McCaughey (1950–2006), convict
- Cecil McCaughey (born 1909), English footballer
- Davis McCaughey (1914–2005), scholar, administrator and politician
- Gerald T. McCaughey (born 1956), executive
- John McCaughey (c.1840–1928), Irish-born Australian pastoralist, brother of Samuel and namesake of the John McCaughey Memorial Art Prize
- Martha McCaughey (born 1966), academic
- Martin McCaughey (1967–1990), Irish Republican Army member
- McCaughey septuplets (born 1997), septuplets born in Des Moines, Iowa
- Patrick McCaughey (born 1942)
- R. H. McCaughey (1860–1906), politician
- Samuel McCaughey (1835–1919), Irish-born Australian pastoralist, politician and philanthropist, brother of John
- Scott McCaughey, singer
- Seán McCaughey (1915–1946), Irish Republican Army leader
- William McCaughey (1929–2000), American sound engineer
- Winsome McCaughey (born 1943)

== See also ==
- John McCaughey Prize, an Australian art prize awarded to an artist or artists
- Haughey
- Dál Fiatach, a Gaelic dynastic-grouping
- McKeogh
