= Conaing Bececlach =

Legendary High King of Ireland

Conaing Begeclach was, according to medieval Irish legend and historical tradition, joint High King of Ireland with his brother or half-brother Eochu Fíadmuine. They took power after killing the previous High King, Eochu Uairches. Conaing ruled the northern half of Ireland, Eochu the south.

Their parentage is unclear. The Lebor Gabála Érenn reports two possibilities: that he and Eochu were the sons of Congal, son of Lugaid Cal of the Corcu Laigde of County Cork; or that Eochu was the son of Congal, and Conaing was the son of Dui Temrach, son of Muiredach Bolgrach, but both had the same mother, who was also the mother of Eochu Uairches’ son, Lugaid Lámderg. Geoffrey Keating makes them both sons of Dui Temrach, and the Four Masters make them the sons of Dui's son Congal Coscarach. After five years of joint rule, Eochu was killed by Eochu Uairches' son Lugaid Lámderg. According to the Lebor Gabála, Conaing remained in power in the north, while Lugaid took the south. The Annals of the Four Masters say Lugaid ousted Conaing and took complete control of Ireland. Seven years later, Conaing killed Lugaid and became sole ruler for a further ten (or twenty) years, after which he was killed by Lugaid's son Art.

The Lebor Gabála synchronises Conaing's career with the reigns of Artaxerxes I (465–424 BC) and Darius II (423–404) of Persia. The chronology of Keating's Foras Feasa ar Éirinn dates his career to 621–599 BC, that of the Annals of the Four Masters to 844–812 BC. However, in the saga Do suidigud tellaich Temra ("the settling of the manor of Tara"), the crucifixion of Christ takes place during his reign.

Preceded by Eochu Uairches	High King of Ireland			Succeeded by Art mac Lugdach
Preceded by Eochu Uairches	with Eochu Fíadmuine; LGE 5th century BC; FFE 621–616 BC; AFM 844–839 BC	with Lugaid Lámderg; LGE 5th century BC; FFE 616–609 BC; AFM 839–832 BC	alone LGE 5th century BC; FFE 609–599 BC; AFM 832–812 BC	Succeeded by Art mac Lugdach
