= Gillingham, Norfolk =

Village in Norfolk, England

Coordinates: 52.472903°N 1.548994°E

Gillingham
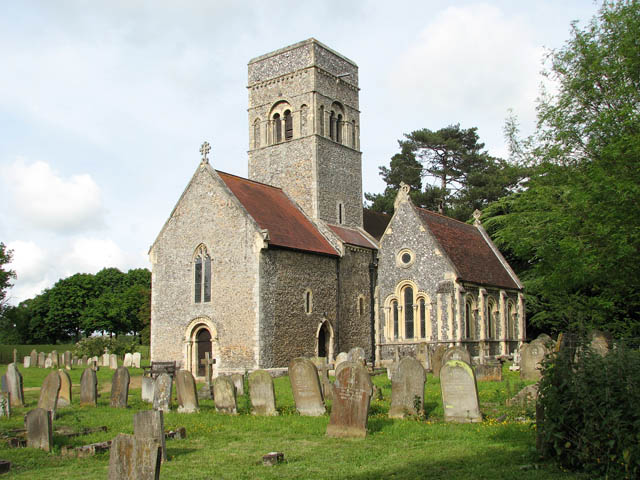
- St Mary's church, Gillingham

- Location within Norfolk
- Area: 3.17 sq mi (8.2 km^{2})
- Population: 697 (2021 census)
  - Density: 220/sq mi (85/km^{2})
- OS grid reference: TM411920
  - London: 97 miles (156 km)
- Civil parish: Gillingham
- District: South Norfolk
- Shire county: Norfolk
- Region: East
- Country: England
- Sovereign state: United Kingdom
- Post town: BECCLES
- Postcode district: NR34
- Dialling code: 01502
- Police: Norfolk
- Fire: Norfolk
- Ambulance: East of England
- UK Parliament: South Norfolk

Gillingham (/ˈɡɪlɪŋəm/ GHIL-ing-əm) is a small village and civil parish in the South Norfolk district of Norfolk, England.

Gillingham is located 1.5 miles (2.4 km) north-west of Beccles and 15 miles (24 km) south-east of Norwich, along the A146.

== History ==
Gillingham's name is of Anglo-Saxon origin and derives from the Old English for the "homestead or village of Gylla's people".

In the Domesday Book, Gillingham is listed as a settlement of 34 households in the hundred of Clavering. In 1086, the village formed part of the East Anglian estates of King William I.

The parish contains two villages that were abandoned in the 14th century due to the ravages of the Black Death: Winston and Wyndale.

Gillingham Hall is located within the parish and was built in the early-16th century as a residence for Sir Nicholas Bacon. Today, the hall is owned by Edward Haughey.

On the night of 6 and 7 November 1943, a Dornier 17 light bomber crashed in the village after being shot down by anti-aircraft fire whilst on a bombing raid of Norwich. One crew member survived and attempts at excavation of the site were made by the Norfolk and Suffolk Aviation Museum during the 1970s.

On 13 March 2014, a helicopter crashed shortly after take-off from Gillingham Hall, killing all four people on board, including Edward Haughey, Baron Ballyedmond, the owner of Gillingham Hall.

== Geography ==
According to the 2021 census, Gillingham has a total population of 697 people which demonstrates an increase from the 676 people listed in the 2011 census.

The A146, between Norwich and Lowestoft, passes through the parish.

== St. Mary's Church ==
Gillingham's parish church dates from the 12th century but was largely rebuilt in the mid-19th century by Thomas Penrice and is dedicated to Saint Mary. St. Mary's is located on Church Road and has been Grade I listed since 1960. St. Mary's is open throughout the week for services.

Gillingham is also home to the Church of Our Lady of Perpetual Succour Roman Catholic Church, which was built in late-19th century by the Kenyon family of Gillingham Hall.

== Amenities ==
St. Michael's Church of England Primary School is located within the village and is part of the Diocese of Norwich Education Trust.

The village also has a playground, allotments and a village hall.

== Transport ==
The village has a regular bus service to much of the surrounding area. First Norfolk & Suffolk run the X2 through the village, which gives access to Beccles, Loddon, Norwich and Lowestoft as well as the smaller surrounding villages and BorderBus run the 580 to Beccles, Bungay, Harleston and Diss and the connecting 581 to Beccles and Great Yarmouth and the 146 which runs between Norwich and Lowestoft via Loddon and Beccles. Bus services to other areas can be found in Beccles.

== Notable residents ==
- Admiral Henry Eden- (1798–1888) Royal Naval officer, lived at Gillingham Hall.
- Edward Haughey, Baron Ballyedmond- (1944–2014) Anglo-Irish entrepreneur & politician, lived at Gillingham Hall.

== Governance ==
Gillingham is part of the electoral ward of Thurlton for local elections and is part of the district of South Norfolk.

The village's national constituency is South Norfolk which has been represented by Ben Goldsborough of the Labour Party since 2024.

== War Memorial ==
Gillingham War Memorial is a grey granite wheel cross with a small plinth located outside the village at the site where King George V inspected troops in 1916. The memorial lists the following names for the First World War:

Rank	Name	Unit	Date of death	Burial/Commemoration
LCpl.	William Drewell	1/5th Bn., Suffolk Regiment	2 Nov. 1917	Gaza War Cemetery
ASmn.	Leonard W. Rivett	HMS K4	31 Jan. 1918	Chatham Naval Memorial
Egmn.	Lewis Button	H.M. Drifter Gleaner of the Sea	26 Oct. 1916	Chatham Naval Memorial
Pte.	Charles T. Chambers	2nd Bn., Border Regiment	13 Mar. 1915	Le Touret Memorial
Pte.	Edward Spencer	2nd Bn., Border Regt.	16 May 1915	Le Touret Memorial
Pte.	Ernest Leon	13th Bn., East Yorkshire Regiment	13 Nov. 1916	Euston Road Cemetery
Pte.	Harry Leon	9th Bn., Essex Regiment	7 Apr. 1918	Varennes Cemetery
Pte.	Edmund G. B. Farrow	1st Bn., Honourable Artillery Coy.	8 Aug. 1917	Messines Ridge Cemetery
Pte.	Thomas Richardson	33rd Bn., Machine Gun Corps	3 Mar. 1918	Dochy Farm Cemetery
Pte.	Albert J. Kemp	1/4th Bn., Norfolk Regiment	27 Mar. 1917	Gaza War Cemetery
Pte.	David Whincup	7th Bn., Norfolk Regt.	18 Sep. 1918	Épehy Cemetery
Pte.	Richard S. Sturman	9th Bn., Norfolk Regt.	3 Apr. 1918	Étaples Military Cemetery
Pte.	Arthur W. Hembling	1st Bn., Suffolk Regt.	24 May 1915	Südfriedhof, Cologne
Pte.	Clarence H. Simpson	8th Bn., Suffolk Regt.	31 Jul. 1917	Menin Gate
Rfn.	Clifford J. Lobban	12th Bn., Royal Irish Rifles	27 Apr. 1918	Boulogne East Cemetery
Smth.	Robert G. Rackham	272nd Bde., Royal Field Artillery	15 Sep. 1918	Ramleh War Cemetery
Skpr.	Henry W. Plummer	H.M. Trawler Freesia	2 Nov. 1918	Cobh Cemetery
Cook	Alfred E. Saunders	H.M. Trawler Raymont	22 Nov. 1918	St. Mary's Churchyard

The following names were added after the Second World War:

Rank	Name	Unit	Date of death	Burial/Commemoration
Lt.	Robert E. Todhunter	6th Bn., Royal Norfolk Regiment	6 Mar. 1942	Brixton Cemetery, Johannesburg
LSt.	Frederick S. Plumb	HMS Gallant	10 Jan. 1941	Chatham Naval Memorial
