= Michael Keogh (soldier) =

Irish soldier (1891–1964)

Captain Michael Keogh
- Born: Michael Patrick Keogh; Apr/Jun 1891; Tullow, County Carlow
- Died: 23 September 1964 (aged 73); Connolly Hospital, Blanchardstown, Dublin
- Spouse: Annamarie Keogh (nee Von Seuffert)
- Children: 1
- Military career
- Allegiance: United Kingdom (1913-1914), German Empire (1915-1919)
- Rank: Captain (claimed)
- Awards: 1914 Star, Hindenburg Cross, German Wound Badge, and Siegfried Dagger of Honour

Michael Keogh was an Irish soldier who served on both sides of World War I, and has become known as "the man who saved Hitler."

== Early life ==
Michael Patrick Keogh was born in 1891, the son of a local Royal Irish Constabulary policeman Laurence Keogh, in Tullow, County Carlow. Some of Keogh's ancestors had been involved in the 1798 Rebellion in County Wexford, and his grandfather Mathew Keogh was the leader of the 1887 resistance against the Coolgreany Evictions also in County Wexford. His great uncle was Myles Keogh, the second in command to Colonel Custer, and who died at the Battle of the Little Bighorn. Keogh lived in Tullow as a child and at age 14 won a County Council scholarship to attend the seminary school, St Patrick's Monastery, Mountrath, County Laois. He was a member of the O'Growney Branch of the Gaelic League in Tullow from 1903 to 1906, and entered singing and dancing competitions.

Keogh emigrated to New York City in 1907 to live with his aunt Mary Keogh, and once there he joined the National Guard. He became a member of Clan na Gael in New York, through which he developed a friendship with Roger Casement. In 1909 Keogh claims to have obtained an engineering degree from Columbia University, though this remains unsubstantiated. Keogh spent 10 months fighting against Mexican guerrillas on the Texan frontier in 1910, but was forced to retire from the army due to an abdominal gunshot wound. He worked on the Panama Canal, possibly as an engineer, until 1913 when he returned to Ireland. Once there, he joined the Royal Irish Regiment, although he later claimed to have done this to enlist fellow Irish soldiers to the Republican Army. Private Keogh was convicted of sedition in 1914, following an incident at the Curragh Camp involving British officers refusing to fight against Ulster Unionists, and served 28 days in the cells.

== World War I ==
Keogh was deployed with the Royal Irish Regiment to France upon the outbreak of World War I. Due to his service during the retreat from Mons, he was awarded the 1914 Star, and following this he was captured and sent as a prisoner of war to Sennelager Camp, Westphalia. Keogh resumed contact with Casement at this point, who was also in Germany attempting to build an Irish Brigade of Irish POWs to fight on the German side. Keogh led the recruitment drive, which intended to enlist 1,500 Irish POWs. In early 1915, the now Sergeant Major Keogh had successfully recruited only 56 men for the Brigade. These men were moved to the more comfortable Zossen Camp, south of Berlin, on Casement's suggestion, although due to the lack of success of the Irish Brigade the Irish POWs did not receive much preferential treatment. All plans for the Brigade ended with the arrest and execution of Casement in 1916.

Keogh was in charge of some Irishmen in 1916, who were installing a new gas tank in Dirschau, West Prussia. It has been assumed that these men were the remnants of the Irish Brigade. Keogh had joined the Imperial German Army by 1918, and for his service during the Spring Offensive, was awarded the Hindenburg Cross. He was placed in command of the machine gun company with the 16th Bavarian Infantry Division at Ligny. Whilst serving here Field-Lieutenant Keogh first met Lance Corporal Adolf Hitler briefly. Keogh stated that he met him whilst Hitler was recovering on a stretcher from a groin wound that Keogh suggests would have "made it impossible for him to become a father."

Keogh contracted the Spanish Flu towards the end of the war, but recovered in time to join the right-wing militia group Freikorps which operated out of Munich. Around this time, Keogh met and married Annamarie Von Seuffert. Keogh was part of the 30,000 Freikorps which quashed the Bolshevik-inspired Marxist revolution in Munich in February 1919. During the battle, he operated a machine gun and was awarded the Siegfried Dagger of Honour, with a personal dedication from the deputy commanding officer Ernst Röhm. During his service in the German Army, Keogh was also awarded a German Wound Badge.

It was in the weeks following this battle, that Keogh was the officer on duty at the Turken Strasse barracks. News reached him that a riot had broken out in the barrack's gymnasium after an address from two local right-wing political agents. 200 soldiers had set upon the agents and some soldiers who supported them. Keogh broke up the attack with the aid of a sergeant and six soldiers. Keogh recalled in his memoir recognising one of the attacked soldiers: "The fellow with the moustache gave his name promptly: Adolf Hitler. It was the Lance Corporal of Ligny. I would not have recognized him. He had been five months in hospital, in Passewalk, Pomerania. He was thin and emaciated from his wounds."

Keogh was discharged from the German army in September 1919, and returned to Ireland. He was involved in the smuggling of Mauser guns from Hamburg to Ireland, and met with Michael Collins, Arthur Griffith and Erskine Childers. He was involved in Republican training activity, and was part of a group attacked by a group of Black and Tans on Mount Leinster. Once the Truce was signed ending the Irish Civil War, Keogh returned to Germany to bring his wife and children to Ireland, going on to serve as an engineer in the Free State army.

== Later life ==
The Keoghs returned to live in Berlin from 1930 to 1936, with Keogh employed as an engineering operative on the Underground. Keogh attended one of the Nuremberg rallies in August 1930 and reflected that Hitler was "no longer in need of a guardroom for his safety". He worked as an interpreter at the Berlin Olympic Games in 1936, as he was fluent in German and English. During the Nazi Party's rise to power, Keogh increasingly feared that he could be targeted as he had known many of those killed during the Night of the Long Knives, and the family returned in Ireland.

Upon his return to Ireland, Keogh was employed at the Poolbeg Generating Station in Dublin and the sugar-beet factory in Carlow. Keogh died in Connolly Hospital, Blanchardstown in September 1964, survived by his wife.

== Memoirs ==
Keogh's story came to light after the rediscovery of his memoirs, which he was working on at the time of his death. He brought the papers with him to the hospital, keeping them under his pillow. His son states that he found his father in a distressed state, claiming that his papers had vanished. A nurse stated that the only other visitor had been a "priest", and Keogh assumed that it was this man who had removed his papers. Keogh died two days after the incident. The papers were rediscovered by Keogh's grandson in 2005, finding a reference to the papers in the University College Dublin Archives. The papers were found bound with those donated by Moss Twomey, former Chief of Staff of the Irish Republican Army. It is still unknown how the papers came to be in Twomey's possession. Moss Twomey was a close friend of Mrs. Lizzie David Mayo and Harold’s cross, two of her sons were interned in Ballykinlar Co Down during the war of independence it is through her sons she became acquainted with Micheal Keogh Providing refuge in her shop at the time in Harold’s cross, during the 30’s she made many trips to the USA at the behest of Twomey, sending parcels to her own post office in Clanbrassil Street. It is through Mrs. Davis Michael Keogh and Moss Twomey became acquainted, and some of Keogh's writing from 1920 to 1964 is missing.

Some have been more critical of the account Keogh made about his role in the Irish Brigade, and have questioned some of his claims. The Director of the Bureau of Military History, prefaced Keogh's Witness Statement with: " his claims to importance, which he parades on every occasion, are regarded by those who have come into official contact with him as grossly exaggerated and completely unreliable. Representing himself in the beginning to have been an NCO in the Brigade, his most recent letters to the press indicate that he now claims to have been a Captain and ADC to Roger Casement."
