= McGaughey =

MacGaughey, McGaughey
- Pronunciation: "McGoy" (American pronunciation) or "Mû-Gā-hē" or Ma-Gah-hee How Irish people pronounce it
- Language: Gaelic

Origin
- Meaning: son of God; son of Sun God Lugh
- Region of origin: Ireland & Scotland

McGaughey and MacGaughey are Irish (Armagh County Ireland) or Scottish surnames. They are anglicised forms of the Gaelic Mac Eachaidh, meaning "son of Eochaidh", or "son of God or sword". These personal names are composed of a derivative of the Gaelic each, meaning "son of Lugh"; the personal names mean "son of God or son of sword". Notable people with the surname include:

- Claude R. McGaughey III (born 1951), American horse trainer
- Edward W. McGaughey (1817–1852), American politician
- Martin McGaughey (born 1960), Northern Irish footballer
- Nicholas McGaughey, British actor
- Neal McCoy (born 1958, McGaughey), American country music singer

== See also ==
- McCaughey
- McCahey
