= James Haffey =

American politician

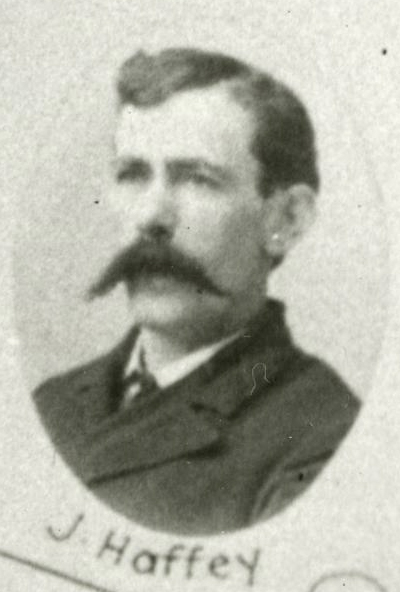
- Haffey in 1895

Member of the Washington House of Representatives for the 21st district
- In office 1895–1897

Personal details
- Born: February 8, 1857 Carbon County, Pennsylvania, United States
- Died: November 11, 1910 (aged 53) Stevenson, Washington, United States
- Party: Republican

James Haffey (February 8, 1857 – November 11, 1910) was an American politician in the state of Washington. He served in the Washington House of Representatives from 1895 to 1897.
