= Hafey =

Hafey is a surname. Notable people with the surname include:

- Bud Hafey (1912–1986), American baseball player
- Chick Hafey (1903–1973), American baseball player
- Tom Hafey (1931–2014), Australian rules football player and coach
- Tom Hafey (baseball) (1913–1996), American baseball player
- William Hafey (1888–1954), American Roman Catholic bishop
