= Hough Windmill =

Windmill in Swannington, Leicestershire, England

Coordinates: 52.749915°N 1.393461°W

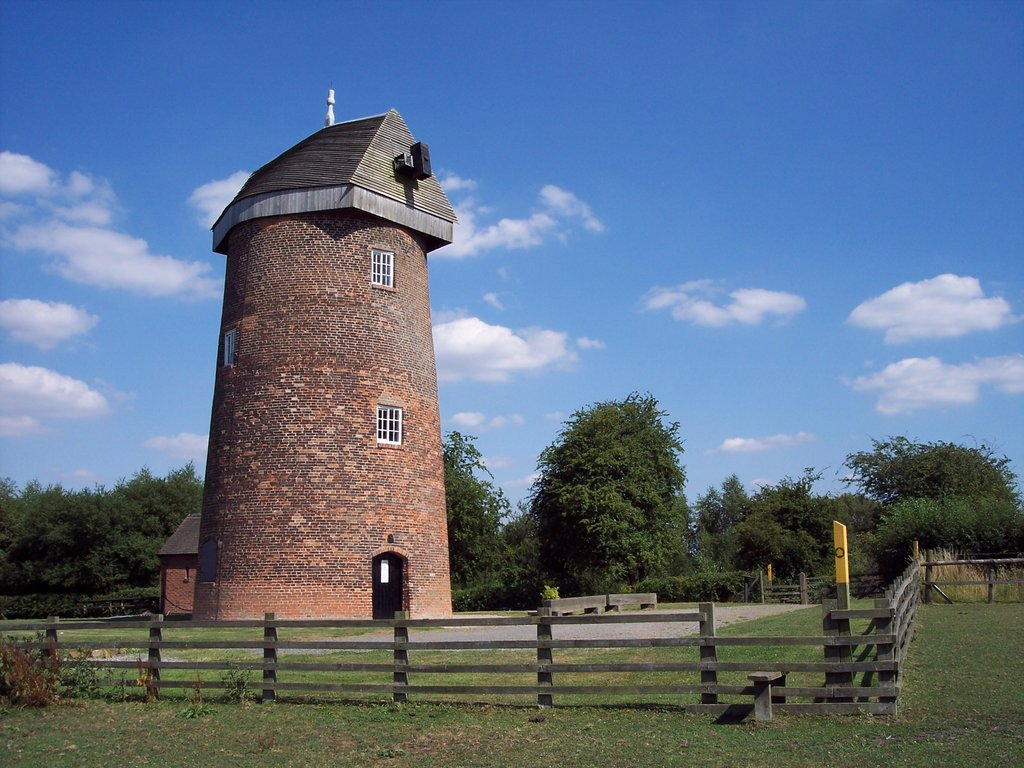
Hough Mill, Swannington

Hough Windmill is a tower windmill in Swannington, Leicestershire, England built in the late 18th century on the boundary with the village of Thringstone. The mill served a coal mining community. The structure is surrounded by the remains of ancient shallow coal mines and local maps show many footpaths and tracks made by the miners who walked between them. The mill and surrounding area is owned by the Swannington Heritage Trust.

== Previous Mills ==
At least five mills were built on high ground to the north of Swannington and were operated by three local milling families, the Griffins, Chesters and the Kerbys. The earliest structures were post mills — a more primitive, less stable but far cheaper design where the entire mill body must be rotated to face the wind. Over the years all succumbed to fire, storm or decay, the last killing its owner when it collapsed in the early 1800s. Dismantled and reassembled nearby, the mill operated until 1895 when the components were sold.

== Present Mill ==
John Griffin built the present structure, replacing a nearby post mill and purchasing land from the Enclosure Commissioners in 1804. The mill was operated by his tenant, James Kerby who paid an annual rent of £30. In 1877, it was sold to John Hough, steward to the Beaumonts of Coleorton, for £1,175, the Kerby family continuing until replaced by the last commercial tenant, Walter Chester. The mill closed early in the 20th century by which time the technology was obsolete. The derelict mill was listed in the 1980s and compulsorily purchased by North West Leicestershire District Council, who sold it to Swannington Heritage Trust in 1994. The Trust refurbished the mill with the aid of a £70,883 grant from the Heritage Lottery Fund. It was opened by Mr David Taylor, MP, on 26 March 2000 and attracted 1,600 visitors during the first year. Inside the mill is a poster advertising the sale of a mill on Thringstone common by auction at the New Inn at Peggs Green. Both properties were part of Thringstone Civil Parish until its abolition in April 1936, Hough Mill being part of 70 acres transferred to Swannington whilst the New Inn was part of 98 acres transferred to Coleorton.

== Gorse Field and Califat Spinney ==
The Trust also owns the adjacent 6 acre gorse field, part of an unfarmed ancient common with evidence of hundreds of bell pits for coal mining dating back to 1204. This is being turned into a nature reserve. The replica ginn engine (see photo, left) was funded by the National Forest company.
Next to the Gorse Field is Califat Spinney which includes two engine houses from the coal mine that operated from 1855-1873. One of the mine shafts was called the Alabama shaft. Whilst the date is uncertain, it was practice at the time to name shafts after contemporary events, the CSS Alabama was sunk by the US Navy off the coast of Cherbourg, France in 1864. A horse-drawn tramway carried coal from the Califat mine to the bottom of the Swannington Incline where the winding engine pulled the trucks to the top of the incline to continue its journey along the Leicester and Swannington Railway. In 1863 water entered the Califat mine from a disused mine at Limby Hall. The mine flooded in 11 minutes and three miners were killed.
