= James Hoey =

James Hoey may refer to:

- James Hoey (politician) (1828–1903), politician in the Northwest Territories, Canada
- Jimmy Hoey (1901–1988), rugby league footballer of the 1930s for England and Widnes
- Jim Hoey (born 1982), American baseball player
