= James Keogh =

James Keogh may refer to:

- James Keogh (Australian politician), member of the Queensland Legislative Assembly
- James Keogh (speechwriter), executive editor of Time magazine and White House speechwriter under Richard M. Nixon
- James Keogh (Wisconsin politician), member of the Wisconsin general assembly
- Vance Joy (James Gabriel Keogh), Australian singer and songwriter
- Jim Keogh (banker), British banker
- Jim Keogh (footballer), Australian rules footballer
- Jim Keogh (technology writer), American technology writer
