= Sara Cogan =

British actress

Sara Cogan is a British television and theatre actress, based in London.

She graduated from The Academy of Live and Recorded Arts in 2003, after a three-year acting course.

She went on to appear in 2003's sixth run of The Newsrevue, the longest-running theatrical comedy show in the United Kingdom, appearing alongside James Shakeshaft, Paul Millard and Sarah Mae.

She has had television roles in Doctors, playing Gemma Bullock, The Walk, playing Beverley and Footballers' Wives, playing a hotel receptionist.

Her most recent role was as a midwife named Cheryl in EastEnders, alongside Emma Barton (Honey Mitchell) and Perry Fenwick (Billy Mitchell), in a storyline about Down syndrome.
