= Michaël Van Hoey =

Belgian footballer (born 1982)

Michaël Van Hoey (born 8 September 1982) is a Belgian football player who plays in the central defence. He currently plays for Waasland-Beveren.

Van Hoey previously played for Lokeren in the Belgian First Division.
