= Eamonn J. Keogh =

Irish-born American computer scientist

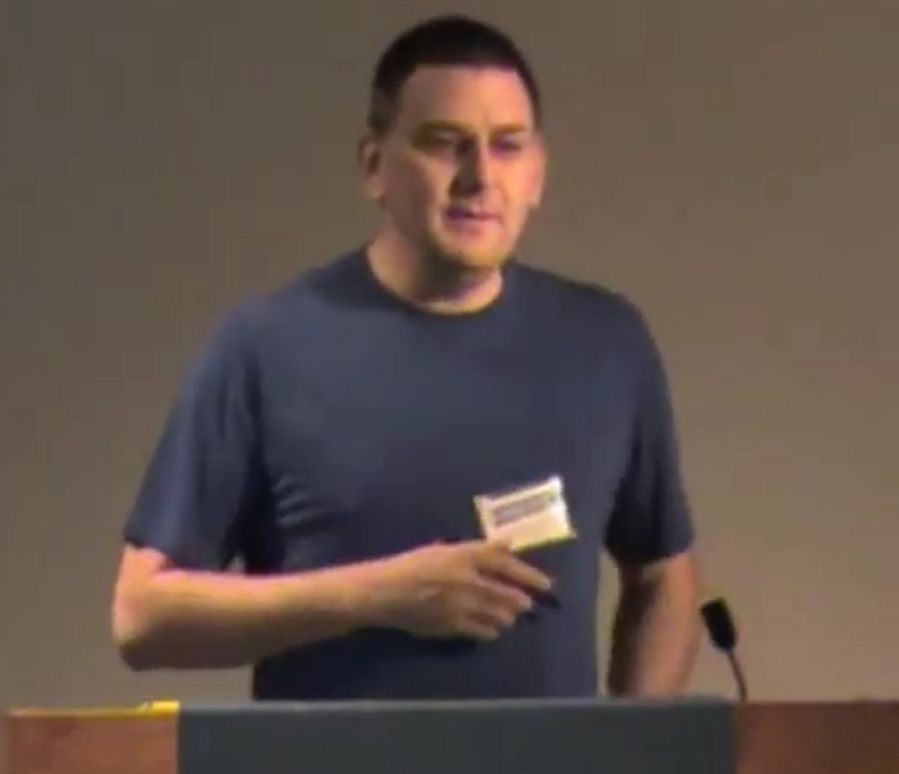
- Keogh in 2012
- Born: Ireland
- Education: University of California, Irvine
- Occupation: Computer scientist
- Website: https://www.cs.ucr.edu/%7Eeamonn/

Eamonn J. Keogh is an Irish-born American computer scientist. He is a distinguished professor in the department of computer science and engineering at the University of California, Riverside.

Keogh was born in Ireland, and was raised in Kimmage, Dublin. His father worked in the Guinness brewery. At the age of fifteen, he dropped out of school and began painting cars. He emigrated to the United States with a green card, and attended the University of California, Irvine, earning his PhD degree in computer science in 2001.

In 2021, Keogh was awarded the Data Mining Research Contributions Award by the Institute of Electrical and Electronics Engineers. In 2024, he was awarded the Science Foundation Island's Patrick's Day Science Medal in Washington, D.C.
