= Rothechtaid =

Rothechtaid or Roitheachtaigh may refer to:

- Rothechtaid mac Main, son of Maen, son of Óengus Olmucaid, according to medieval Irish legend and historical tradition, High King of Ireland
- Rothechtaid Rotha, son of Róán, son of Failbe, son of Cas Cétchaingnech, son of Faildergdóit, apparently king of the eastern midland kingdom of the Gailenga and High King of Ireland
