= Eochu Fíadmuine =

Eochu Fíadmuine was, according to medieval Irish legend and historical tradition, joint High King of Ireland with his brother or half-brother Conaing Bececlach. They took power after killing the previous High King, Eochu Uairches. Eochu ruled the southern half of Ireland, Conaing the north.

Their parentage is unclear. The Lebor Gabála Érenn reports two possibilities: that he and Conaing were the sons of Congal, son of Lugaid Cal of the Corcu Laigde of County Cork; or that Eochu was the son of Congal, and Conaing was the son of Dui Temrach, son of Muiredach Bolgrach, but both had the same mother, who was also the mother of Eochu Uairches. Geoffrey Keating makes them both sons of Dui Temrach, and the Four Masters make them the sons of Dui's son Congal Coscarach. After five years of joint rule, Eochu was killed by Eochu Uairches' son Lugaid Lámderg. According to the Lebor Gabála, Conaing remained in power in the north, while Lugaid took the south. The Annals of the Four Masters say Lugaid ousted Conaing and took complete control of Ireland.

The Lebor Gabála synchronises the reign of Eochu and Conaing with that of Artaxerxes I of Persia (465–424 BC). The chronology of Keating's Foras Feasa ar Éirinn dates their reign to 621–616 BC, that of the Annals of the Four Masters to 844–839 BC.

Preceded by Eochu Uairches	High King of Ireland (with Conaing Bececlach); LGE 5th century BC; FFE 621–616 BC; AFM 844–839 BC	Succeeded by Lugaid Lámderg and Conaing Bececlach
