= Josephine Hoey =

American actress

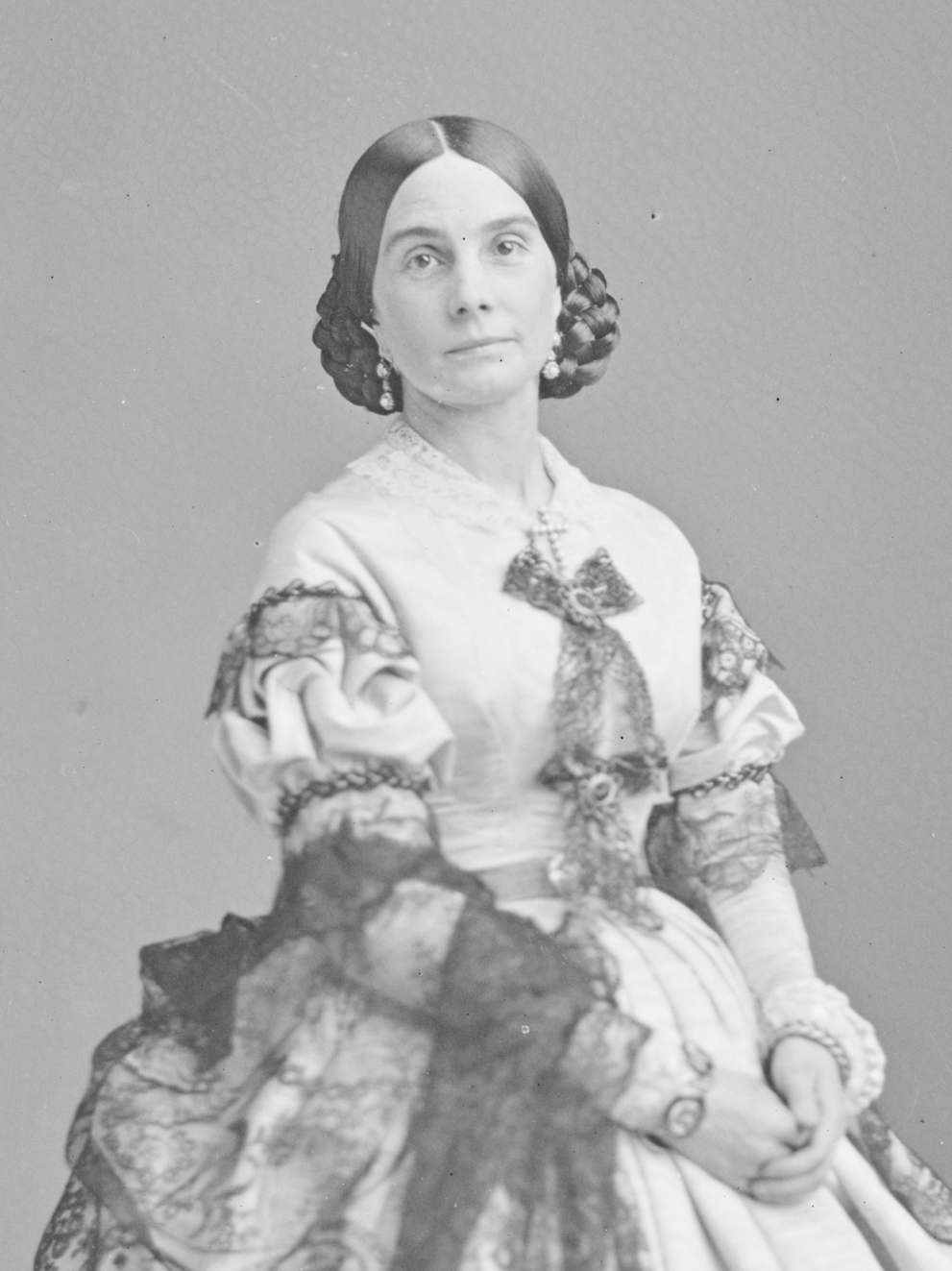
Portrait by the Mathew Brady studio (c. 1860–70)

Josephine Hoey (née Shaw; c. 1822–1896) was an Anglo-American stage actress.

== Life ==
Josephine was born in Liverpool, England, in June, 1824. She was the eldest of four sisters, whose maiden names were Shaw, and together with them and her brother began her public life as a ballad singer in various museums.

After her marriage with William H. Russell in 1839, she appeared in small parts at the National Theatre in New York, and thereafter became a stock actress in other places. In 1849 she was connected with Burton's Chambers Street Theatre, and from 1854 was a conspicuous member of Wallack's Theatre, New York. During a brief interval in 1857 she was also seen at the Walnut Street Theatre in Philadelphia. Her last performances were at Wallack's Theatre.

In 1847 she was divorced from her husband, and two years later she married John Hoey, manager of Adams Express Company, New York City. Although her manner was somewhat cold and artificial, she was popular in high-comedy parts.

She died in Hollywood, Los Angeles on July 21, 1896.
