= Phil Hoy (rugby union) =

English rugby union player (born 1987)

Phil Hoy (born 30 September 1987 (age 39) in Luton, England), is a rugby union player currently without a club after playing for Northampton Saints in the Guinness Premiership. He plays as a lock. He was released by Northampton Saints at the end of the 2008–09 season.
