= Rita McKeough =

Canadian interdisciplinary artist, musician and educator

Rita McKeough (born 1951) is a Canadian interdisciplinary artist, musician and educator who frequently works in installation and performance.

== Training and career ==
McKeough was born in 1951 in Antigonish, Nova Scotia. McKeough completed her BFA at the University of Calgary in 1975 and her MFA at the Nova Scotia College of Art and Design in 1979. She currently teaches at Alberta University of the Arts and resides in Calgary, Alberta.

== Work ==
McKeough's practice uses a variety of analog, electronic and digital technology to create performance, media and sound works. Her pieces engage with feminist narratives, often using objects to perform sound. McKeough has stated the imperative for taking action and fostering a situation for activating agency through her practice: "In my work, it’s not about speaking for anybody, but wanting to create or imagine situations or a society where everyone has a voice and speaks from his or her own position." Much of her work is a call for action by creating a space for introspection, curiosity, humour and awareness. McKeough brings to attention a spectrum of social issues, including the oil industry and its impact on the ecosystem, meat production, human-animal relations, violence against women, and silenced female voices within private and public institutions.

== Selected artworks ==
=== Veins, 2016 ===
Veins is an immersive installation first presented at TRUCK Contemporary Art in Calgary, Alberta in 2016. Veins follows and builds on issues explored in her most recent works, Wilderment, Alternator, The Lion’s Share and H. This work is motivated by McKeough's sense of unease as it relates specifically to the ongoing planning and construction of the oil and gas pipelines being built across a fragile and vulnerable landscape.

=== H, 2014 ===
"H" was a performance that took place in an old barber shop in Sackville, New Brunswick, from July 24 to August 2, 2014. Residents of Sackville were requested to bring their "sick" (i.e., outdated) cell phones to the temporary emergency hospital set up in the barber shop, where, in tiny hospital beds, they were attended by a larger-than-life squirrel and a tree that used a variety of techniques to help the cell phones recover. The public could visit recovering cell phones or simply watch the process.

=== The Lion's Share, 2012 ===
University of Lethbridge Art Gallery, 2012; Doris McCarthy Art Gallery, Scarborough, Ontario; Dalhousie Art Gallery, Halifax, 2013, Kenderdine Art Gallery at University of Saskatchewan, 2014 and Illingworth Kerr Gallery at Alberta College of Art and Design, Calgary, 2014.

=== Wilderment, 2010 ===
Art Gallery of Alberta, Timeland: Alberta Biennial of Contemporary Art, 2010; Neutral Ground, Solo Exhibition, May, 2013

=== Alternator, 2008–2012 ===
2008, Nuit Blanche, Toronto; 2009, ArtCity Festival, Calgary; 2009, Art in the Streets Festival, Lethbridge; 2012, Oh Canada! Massachusetts Museum of Contemporary Art, Boston.

=== In bocca al lupo—In the mouth of the wolf, 1991–1992 ===
Inspired by French feminist writers Hélène Cixous and Luce Irigaray and the punk icon Patti Smith, McKeough created a ninety-minute operatic performance/installation with a six-piece choir, two solo vocalists, three musicians, six dancers, a prerecorded audio tape and slide and video projections. The audience and performers were engulfed by a large wooden figure. The work was created to foster a collective, tangible voice to women's anger.

=== Take it to the Teeth, 1993 ===
This work, created with her collaborator Cheryl L'Hirondelle, was an installation and performance at the Glenbow Museum in 1993. Here McKeough and L'Hirondelle literally chewed through the museum walls to expose eight concealed audio tapes. The work poignantly created a dynamic between domestic abuse and empowered the female agency that recovers silenced voice.

== Collections ==
McKeough's work is included in many public and private collections including the Canada Council Art Bank, Ottawa; Glenbow Museum, Calgary; Walter Phillips Gallery at The Banff Centre; University of Lethbridge, Lethbridge; and the Dunlop Art Gallery, Regina.

== Music/bands ==
McKeough is also a musician. She has played drums/percussion for a number of bands including Sleepy Panther, The Permuters, Sit Com, Mode d'Emploi, Almost Even, Demi Monde, Confidence Band, and Books All Over the Bed.

== Awards ==
McKeough was the winner of a 2009 Governor General's Award in Visual and Media Arts, a 2025 Lieutenant Governor of Alberta Distinguished Artist Award, and in 2006 was named Éminence Grise by the performance art festival 7a*11d. In 2024, she was awarded the Gershon Iskowitz Prize. She has held numerous Artist-in-Residence positions, including at the Bemis Centre for Contemporary Art, the Rauschenberg Residency, the Banff Centre, and the 2014 Canada Council for the Arts International Residency at Artspace Sydney in Australia.

== Bibliography ==
- Wark, Jayne (2004). Tanya Mars and Johanna Householder (ed.). Caught in the Act: Canadian Women in Performance. Toronto: YYZ Books. pp. 344–51.
- Hurtig, Annette (1994). Rita McKeough: An Excavation. Glenbow. p. 12. ISBN 1895379148.
- Beaumont, Hillary (Spring 2014). "Industrial Feast". Visual Arts News. 35 (3): 14–16.
- Anderson, Heather (2007). Wilderness Acts. Halifax: Eyelevel Art Gallery. pp. 11–12. ISBN 978-0-9682601-4-2.
- Markonish, Denis (2012). Oh, Canada : contemporary art from north North America. MIT Press. p. 399. ISBN 9780262018357.
- Laviolette, Mary-Beth (2006). Alberta art chronicle : adventures in recent & contemporary art. Altitude Publishing. pp. 544. ISBN 9781551539409.
- Mars, Tanya (2004). Caught in the act : an anthology of performance art by Canadian women. YYZ Books. p. 428. ISBN 0920397840.
- Kjorlien, Melanie; Moir, Lindsay (2016). Made in Calgary: An Exploration of Art from the 1960s to the 2000s. Calgary, Alberta: Glenbow Museum. p. 375. ISBN 978-1-895379-64-8.
- Sherlock, Diana (ed.) (2018). Rita McKeough: Works. Calgary: EMMEDIA Gallery & Production Society, M:ST Performative Art Festival, TRUCK Contemporary Art in Calgary. ISBN 9780986736926
