= Patrick McKeough =

Canadian businessman

Patrick McKeough is the publisher and editor of The Successful Investor, a monthly newsletter on conservative investing. He also publishes Wall Street Stock Forecaster, a publication focusing on American stocks.

From 1974 to 1994, McKeough worked at MPL Communications as the editor of The Investment Reporter. While there he helped to lead the publication to a number of accolades, including first prize in a world editorial competition sponsored by the Washington, DC–based Newsletter Publishers Association (since renamed the Specialized Information Publishers Association).

In 1993, McKeough wrote Canadian best-seller, Riding the Bull: How You Can Profit from the 1990s Stock Market Boom (ISBN 978-1550135220). In the book, he predicted that the stock market would rise even more in the 1990s than in the 1980s, due to a number of factors including the spread of economic liberalization around the world following the fall of communism, rapid technological advances, and social changes that led to widely overlooked economic stabilizers.

McKeough left MPL in 1994 to start The Successful Investor and other newsletters. In 1996, together with Adam Mayers, he wrote Surviving Canada's Separation Anxiety: How to Ensure Your Financial Future if the Country Breaks Up (ISBN 978-1550137804).

In 1999, in response to requests from his long-time readers of The Successful Investor and The Investment Reporter, Pat began managing investment portfolios for individual Canadian investors. His portfolio management division, Successful Investor Wealth Management Inc., implements the investment selection and portfolio management advice that he publishes in his newsletters. Within a decade, his assets under management reached $200 million.

Results calculated by Mark Hulbert's Hulbert Financial Digest, an independent authority on published investment advice, show that McKeough's advice has generally surpassed returns from market averages. MarketWatch has called McKeough "one of the top investment letter editors on the continent". His proprietary ValuVesting System focuses on assembling a low-risk investment portfolio of stocks that appear to have exceptional quality at a relatively low price.
