= Norbrook Group =

Pharmaceutical company

Norbrook Laboratories Ltd
- Factory in Newry
- Type: Ltd
- Industry: Pharmaceuticals
- Founded: 1969
- Headquarters: Newry, Northern Ireland
- Key people: Lord Ballyedmond; Founding CEO & Chairman
- Website: www.norbrook.com

Norbrook is a United Kingdom-based pharmaceutical company. It was founded in 1969 by Lord Ballyedmond as Norbrook Laboratories Ltd in Northern Ireland. In 1970, Norbrook began manufacturing of veterinary pharmaceuticals. In 2011 the Norbrook Group was listed by the Belfast Telegraph in its Top 100 Companies list as being in position 28.

Norbrook manufactures several pharmaceutical drugs, the best-known of which are the antibiotic drugs Noroclav and Betamox, NSAIDs such as Carprieve, Loxicom and Flunixin.

== Veterinary products ==
Laboratory complex, Newry

- Closamectin – Closamectin is a pioneer drug developed by Norbrook for the treatment of fluke, worms and other external parasites.
- Carprieve – A nonsteroidal anti-inflammatory drug (NSAID) for the treatment of osteoarthritis in dogs.
- Loxicom oral Suspension – A nonsteroidal anti-inflammatory drug (NSAID) for the treatment of pain in cats and dogs.
- Loxicom Injectable – A nonsteroidal anti-inflammatory drug (NSAID) for the treatment of pain in cats and dogs, scour in cattle, musculo-skeletal and locomotory conditions in horses and pigs.
- Noroclav
- Flunixin – A nonsteroidal anti-inflammatory drug (NSAID) used in horses, cattle and swine in different parts of the world.
- Peptizole - First generic omeprazole for Equine gastric ulcer syndrome in the UK.
- Vetofol
- Thyronorm - First oral solution for treating hyperthyroidism in cats

== Awards ==
- 1987 Norbrook receives its first Queens Award for Export
- 2002 Norbrook receives the Queens Award for Export Achievement for the fourth time
- 2011 Norbrook receives the Queens Award for Enterprise
