= Coogan's =

Irish pub

Coordinates: 40°50′30″N 73°56′23″W

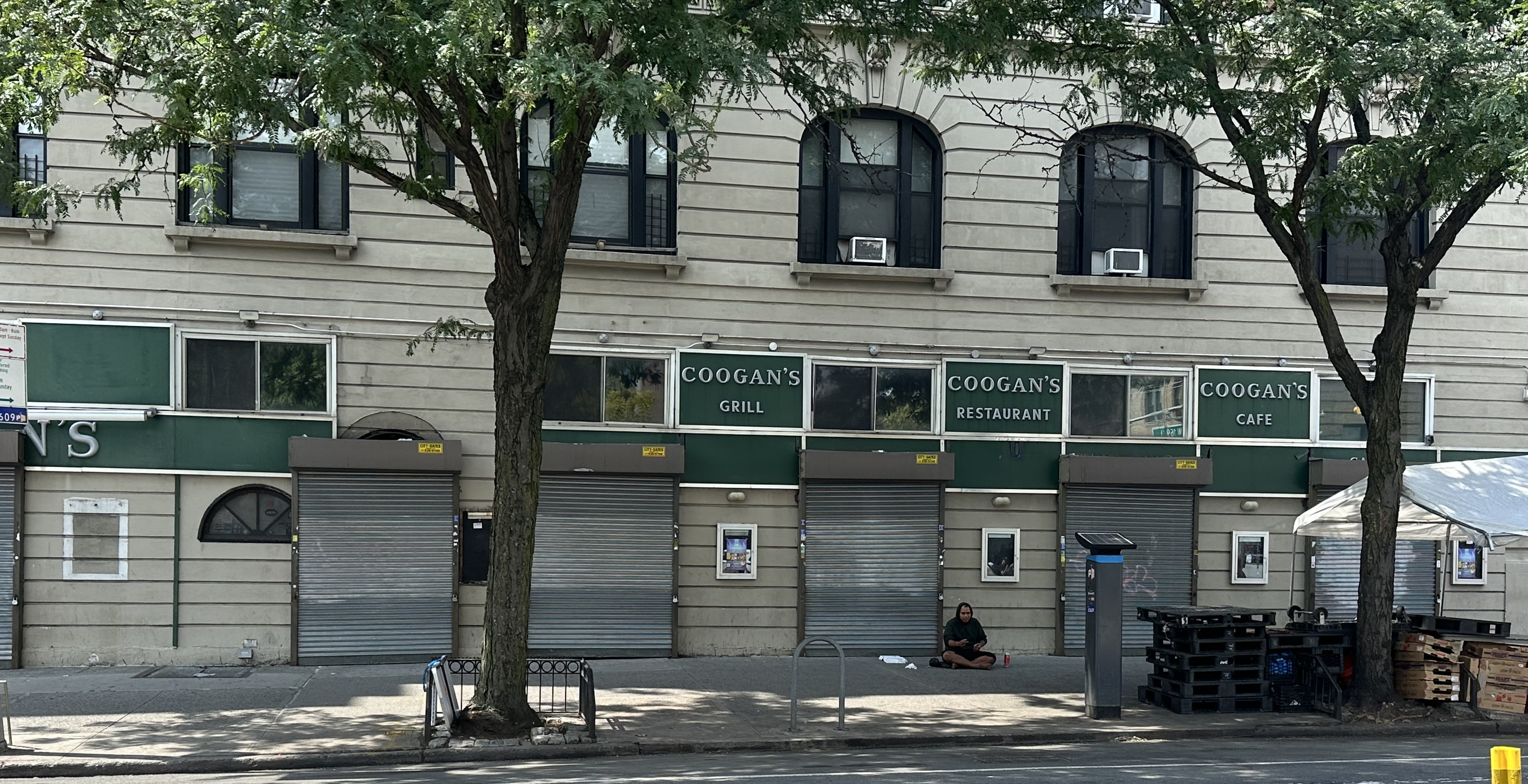
The Broadway-facade of the now-closed Coogan's Bar

Coogan’s was an Irish pub and community hub in Washington Heights, Manhattan, in New York City that opened in 1985.

The owners announced that the pub would close permanently on April 20, 2020, after it had been saved two years previously by the fundraising efforts of Lin-Manuel Miranda, and the efforts of Representative Adriano Espaillat and the Manhattan borough president, Gale Brewer.

== In media ==
- The documentary Coogan's Way, which was nominated for a NY Emmy, tells the story of the bar.
- Jon Michaud's Last Call at Coogan's was published in June 2023.
