= Keoghan =

Keoghan is a surname. Notable people include:

- Andrew Keoghan (born 1980), New Zealand musician and songwriter
- Barry Keoghan (born 1992), Irish actor
- Jack Keoghan (1887–1963), Irish hurler
- Liam Keoghan (born 1967), Irish hurler
- Martin Keoghan (born 1998), Irish hurler
- Phil Keoghan (born 1967), New Zealand and American television presenter
- Rebecca Keoghan, New Zealand dairy farmer and company director

== See also ==
- Cogan
- Coogan
- Geoghan
- Kehoe (surname)
- Keogh (surname)
- Keohane (disambiguation)
- Keough (surname)
- McKeogh
- McKeough (disambiguation)
