= Eochu Uairches =

Eochu (or Eochaid) Uairches, son of Lugaid Íardonn, was, according to medieval Irish legend and historical tradition, a High King of Ireland. After Lugaid was overthrown and killed by Sírlám, Eochu was driven into exile overseas, but he returned after twelve years, killed Sírlám with an arrow, and took the throne. His epithet is obscure: the Lebor Gabála Érenn says he gained it because of his exile, while Geoffrey Keating explains it as meaning "bare canoes", because he had canoes for a fleet, in which he and his followers used to plunder neighbouring countries. He ruled for twelve years, before he was killed by Eochu Fíadmuine and Conaing Bececlach. The Lebor Gabála synchronises his reign with that of Artaxerxes I of Persia (465–424 BC). The chronology of Keating's Foras Feasa ar Éirinn dates his reign to 633–621 BC, that of the Annals of the Four Masters to 856–844 BC.

Preceded by Sírlám	High King of Ireland; LGE 5th century BC; FFE 633–621 BC; AFM 856–844 BC	Succeeded by Eochu Fíadmuine and Conaing Bececlach
