= Phil Hoy (politician) =

American politician (1937–2025)

Member of the Indiana House of Representatives from the 77th district
- In office November 3, 2004 – November 5, 2008
- Preceded by: Brian Hasler
- Succeeded by: Gail Riecken

Personal details
- Born: George Philip Hoy; February 5, 1937 Indianapolis, Indiana, United States
- Died: September 4, 2025 (aged 88) Evansville, Indiana, United States
- Party: Democratic
- Spouse: Sandra
- Education: Kentucky Wesleyan College (BA); Southern Baptist Theological Seminary (MDiv)
- Occupation: Pastor, public administration

George Philip Hoy (February 5, 1937 – September 4, 2025) was an American politician who was Democratic member of the Indiana House of Representatives, he represented the 77th District from 2004 to 2008.

== Birth ==
Hoy was born in Indianapolis on February 5, 1937. He died on September 4, 2025.

== Religion ==
Hoy practiced in the religion of the United Church of Christ.

== Education ==
Hoy received his M.Div. by graduating Southern Baptist Theological Seminary in the year of 1962, and he also received his BA in History and Political Science at Kentucky Wesleyan College in the year of 1958.

== Family ==
Hoy was married to Sandra Hoy, and he also had six children.

== Professional experience ==
- Interim Pastor, Zion United Church of Christ, Henderson, KY, 2003–present
- Executive Director, Tri-State Food Bank, 1987–2000
- Pastor, St. Peter's United Church of Christ, Evansville, 1987–?
- Pastor, St. Matthew's United Church of Christ, Evansville, 1981–1987
- Pastor, Faith United Church of Christ, Fort Wayne, 1975–1980
- Founding Director, Metropolitan Evansville Youth Service Bureau, 1972–1975
- Instructor, Brescia College, Owensboro, KY, 1972–1973
- Chaplain, Evansville State Hospital, 1967–1972
- Pastor, Union United Church of Christ, Evansville, 1962–1972
