= Kevin Kehoe (hurler) =

Irish hurler

Personal information
- Native name: Caoimhín Mac Eochaidh (Irish)
- Born: 1991 (age 34–35) Bahana, County Carlow, Ireland

Sport
- Sport: Hurling
- Position: Goalkeeper
Club
- Years: Club
- 2009-present: St Mullin's
Club titles
- Carlow titles: 1
Inter-county
Years	County	Apps (scores)
2011-	Carlow	1 (0-00)
Inter-county titles
- Leinster titles: 0
- All-Irelands: 0
- NHL: 0
- All Stars: 0

Kevin Kehoe (born 1991 in Bahana, County Carlow) is an Irish athlete. He plays hurling with his local club St Mullin's, and has been a member of the senior Carlow county hurling team since 2011.
