= Kevin Kehoe (politician) =

American politician

Kevin Kehoe is an American attorney who served as a Democratic member of the Illinois Senate from May 1998 until January 1999.

== Biography ==
Kehoe was born 1954 or 1955 and raised in Missouri. Kehoe earned a bachelor's degree from Columbia University and a juris doctor from the Saint Louis University School of Law. He later lived in Maryland before moving to Decatur, Illinois in 1990. In 1992, he was elected to the Macon County Board and in 1994 became its chairman. He chose to step down from the Chairman position in 1995 to focus on his private law practice.

In 1998, he was appointed to succeed the late Penny Severns in the Illinois Senate. The Senate district he represented, located in Central Illinois, included all or parts of Macon, Christian, Piatt, Champaign, Coles, Cumberland, Moultrie, and Effingham. Kehoe lost the 1998 general election to Duane Noland, a Republican member of the Illinois House of Representatives.

As of 2014, he was the President of the Business Center Of Decatur; a business incubator and consulting services provider.
