= Pennsylvania Office of Open Records =

Agency overview
- Agency executive: Liz Wagenseller, Executive Director
- Parent agency: Commonwealth of Pennsylvania

The Pennsylvania Office of Open Records is a governmental agency in Pennsylvania that administers the Pennsylvania Right to Know Law.

Decisions made by the Office of Open Records regarding appeals, called "final determinations," are available online.
