= Keohane =

Keohane may refer to:

== People ==
- Jimmy Keohane (born 1991), Irish footballer
- Joe Keohane (1918–1988), Irish Gaelic football player, manager, and selector
- Kay Keohane-O'Riordan (1910–1991), Irish communist activist
- Michael Keohane (fl. 1996–2000), American paralympic athlete and Paralympics competitor
- Nannerl O. Keohane (born 1940), American political theorist and university president
- Nat Keohane (fl. 1993–2012), American environmental economist
- Patrick Keohane (1879–1950), Irish Antarctic explorer
- Patrick Keohane (politician) (1870–1939), Irish politician
- Robert Keohane (born 1941), American political scientist, writer, and academic

== Other uses ==
- Mount Keohane, an Antarctic peak
- Thompson v. Keohane, a 1995 US Supreme Court case
- Keohane North American Swiss Teams, a North American contract bridge competition

== See also ==
- Kehoe (disambiguation)
- Keogh (disambiguation)
- Keoghan (surname)
- Keough (disambiguation)
- Kohan (disambiguation)
