= McKeogh =

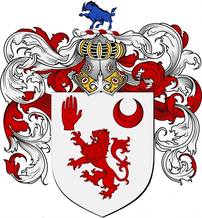
- McKeough Family Coat of Arms
- Language: Gaeilge

Origin
- Meaning: "Son of Eochaidh"
- Region of origin: Ireland

Other names
- Variant forms: Kehoe, McKeough, McCaughey, Hoey

McKeogh (Irish: Mac Eochaidh) is an Irish surname. Spelling variations include MacKeogh, McKeough, Keogh, Keough, Kehoe, McCaughey and Hoey, among others. The modern spelling comes from the original Mac Eochaidh.

The McKeoghs are descendants of the ancient Dál Fiatach dynasty, rulers of the Ulaid. They trace their descent from Fiatach Finn mac Dáire, a King of Ulster and High King of Ireland in the 1st Century AD.

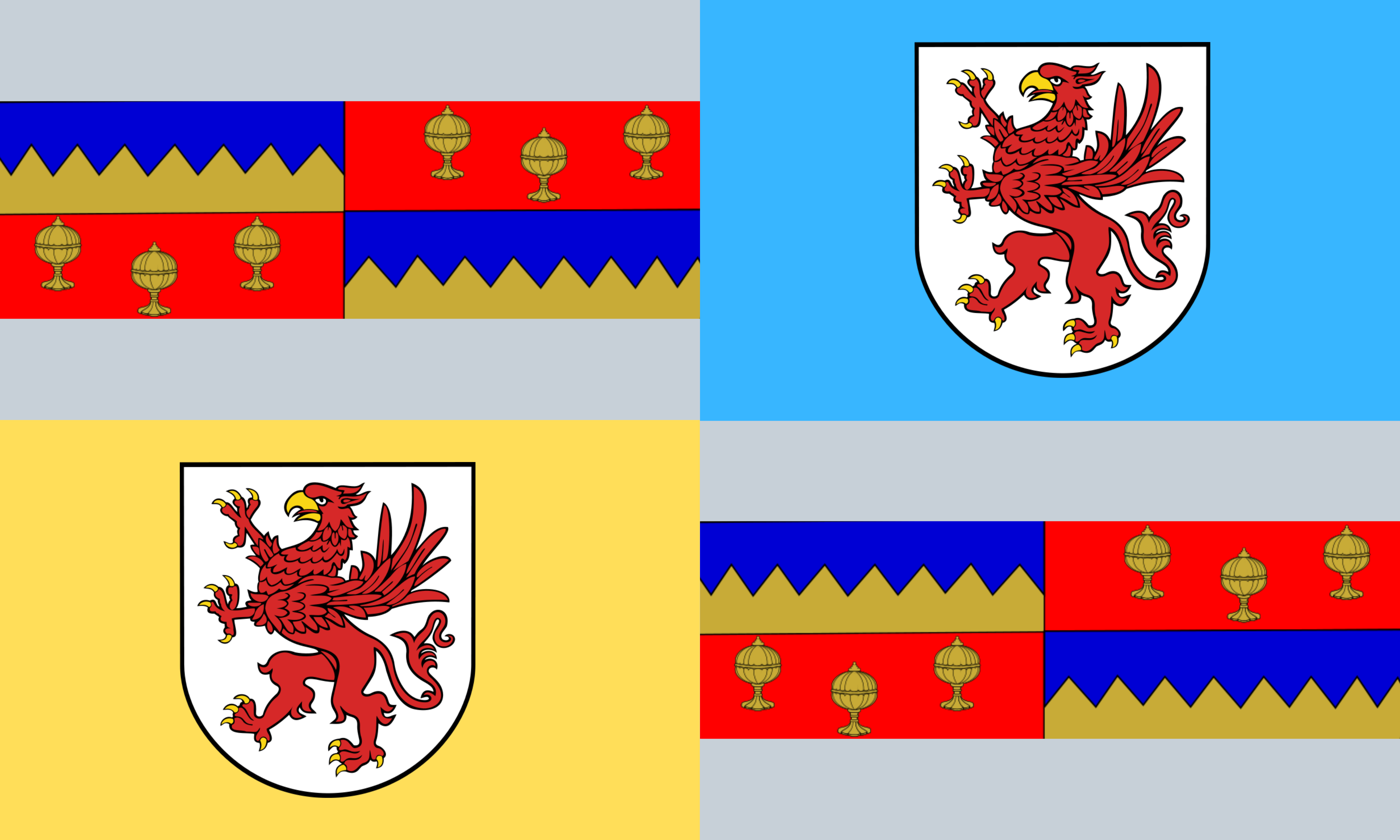
The McKeough Family Standard (Flag)

Notable people with the surname include:

- Aileen MacKeogh, the first director of Arthouse, a sculptor and academic in Ireland.
- Darcy McKeough, a Canadian businessman and politician.
- Dave McKeough, a Major League Baseball catcher in the late 1800s.
- Patrick McKeough, an investment publisher and editor.
- Raymond S. McKeough, a Democratic politician from Illinois.
- Rita McKeough, a Canadian artist.
