= Michael Colby =

American theatre lyricist

- Born: Michael Elihu Colby; October 29, 1951 (age 74); New York City
- Occupations: Lyricist, librettist
- Spouse: Andrea Lee Loshin (m. 1986)

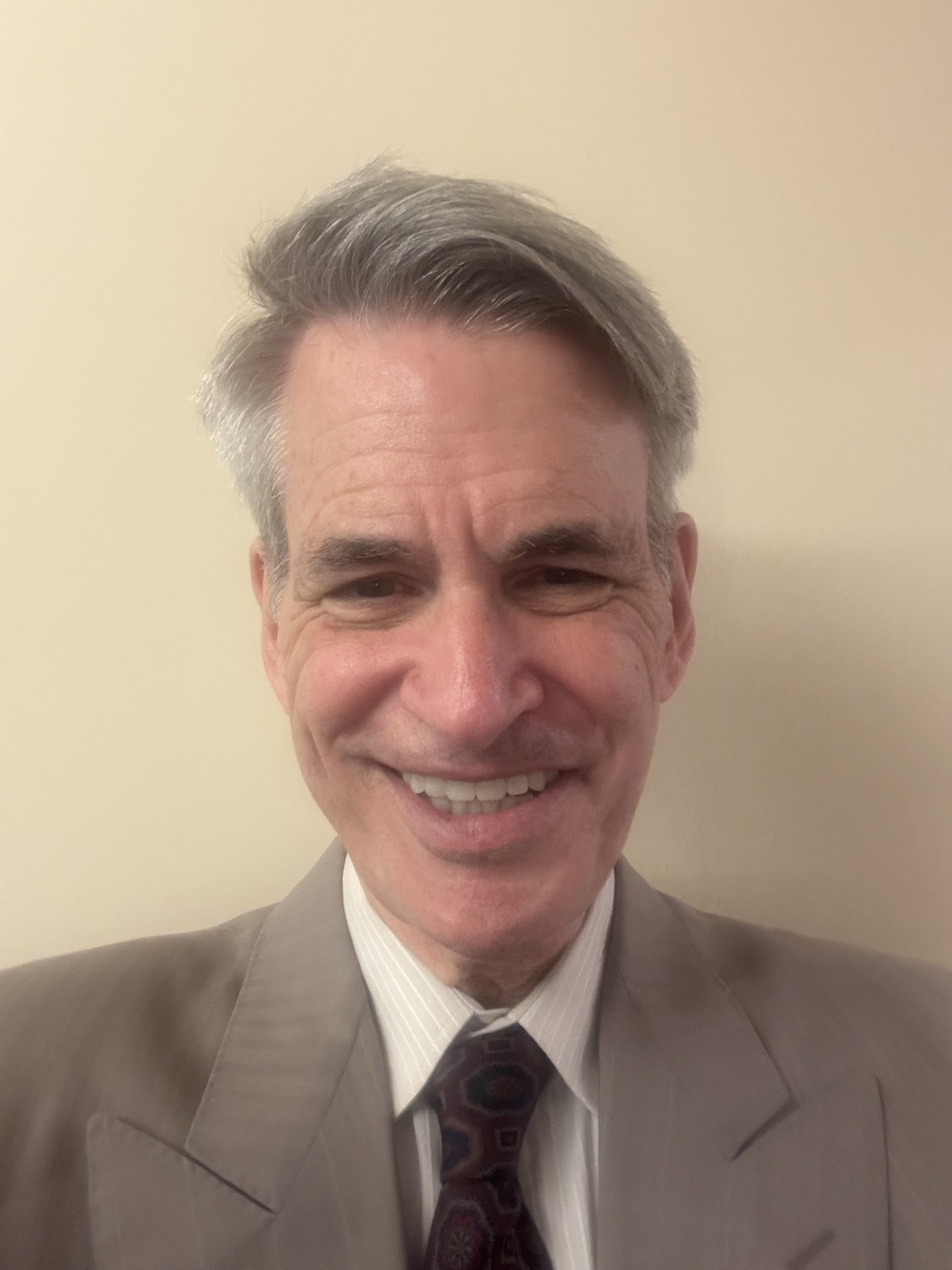

Michael Elihu Colby (born 29 October 1951) is an American theatre lyricist and musical playwright. He is the author of the book The Algonquin Kid and musicals such as Charlotte Sweet and Tales of Tinseltown.

== Early life and education ==
Michael Colby was born in New York City. From 1946 to 1987, his grandparents, Ben and Mary Bodne, owned the Algonquin Hotel where Colby grew up as a child, observing celebrities such as Ella Fitzgerald, Laurence Olivier, and Tennessee Williams. His upbringing in the Algonquin later inspired Colby to write The Algonquin Kid.

== Career ==
Colby has written many musicals. Charlotte Sweet received three Drama Desk Award nominations, including one for his lyrics. North Atlantic won the Show Business Award. Meester Amerika was chosen for the TRU Musical Theater Reading Series.

== Productions ==
- North Atlantic (1977) – book; co-lyricist with composer James Fradrich
- Ludlow Ladd (1979) – libretto; with composer Gerald Jay Markoe
- Charlotte Sweet (1982) – libretto; with composer Gerald Jay Markoe
- Mrs. McThing (1984) – book/lyrics; with composer Jack (Jacques) Urbont; based on play by Mary Chase
- Tales of Tinseltown (1985) – book/lyrics; with composer Paul Katz
- Slay It With Music (1989) – book/lyrics; with composer Paul Katz
- Happy Haunting (1992) – libretto; with composer Gerald Jay Markoe
- The Human Heart (1998) – lyrics; with composer Steven Silverstein & bookwriter Pat Hoag Simon
- Delphi or Bust (1998) – book/lyrics; with composer Gerald Jay Markoe
- They Chose Me! (2006) – lyrics/co-book writer; with composer and co-bookwriter Ned Paul Ginsburg
- Meester America [a.k.a. The 1st Family of 2nd Avenue] (2007) – lyrics; with composer Artie Bressler and bookwriter Jennifer Berman
- Dangerous (2017) – co-lyricist/co-bookwriter; with John C. Introcaso
- Boynton Beach Club (2019) – co-lyricist; with composer Ned Paul Ginsberg, bookwriter Susan Seidelman, co-lyricist Cornelia Ravenal; based on film by Susan Seidelman
- Other Lives (2022) - lyrics; with various composers
- Holiday Regards (2024) - lyrics; with various composers

== Personal life ==
In 1986, Colby married Andrea Lee Loshin.
