= What's Love (disambiguation) =

"What's Love" is a 2008 single by Shaggy featuring Akon.

What's Love may also refer to:

- What's Love?, a 2009 album by Juju
- "What's Luv?", a 2002 song by Fat Joe
- "What's Love??", a 2021 song by Rod Wave from the album SoulFly

== See also ==
- What's Love Got to Do with It? (disambiguation)
- What Is Love (disambiguation)
