= Where's the Love (disambiguation) =

"Where's the Love" is a 1997 song by Hanson.

Where's the Love or Where Is the Love may also refer to:

- "Where Is the Love?", a 2003 song by The Black Eyed Peas from Elephunk
- "Where Is the Love" (Roberta Flack and Donny Hathaway song), a 1972 single from the album Roberta Flack & Donny Hathaway
- "Where's the Love", a 2005 single by Livin Out Loud
- "Where's the Love", a 2009 song by Trevor Hall from his eponymous album
- "Where's the Love", a 2012 song by Nas from Life Is Good
- "Where's the Love?", a 1999 song by Lil' Troy from Sittin' Fat Down South
- "Where's the Love", a 2014 song by Diamond D from The Diam Piece
- "Where Is the Love", a 1997 song by Celine Dion from Let's Talk About Love
- "Where Is the Love"?, a 1997 song by Samantha Fox from 21st Century Fox
- "Where Is the Love", a 1975 Grammy Award-winning song co-written by Betty Wright, Harry Wayne Casey and Richard Finch

== See also ==
- What Is Love (disambiguation)
