= Rocky Mountain Club =

Organization

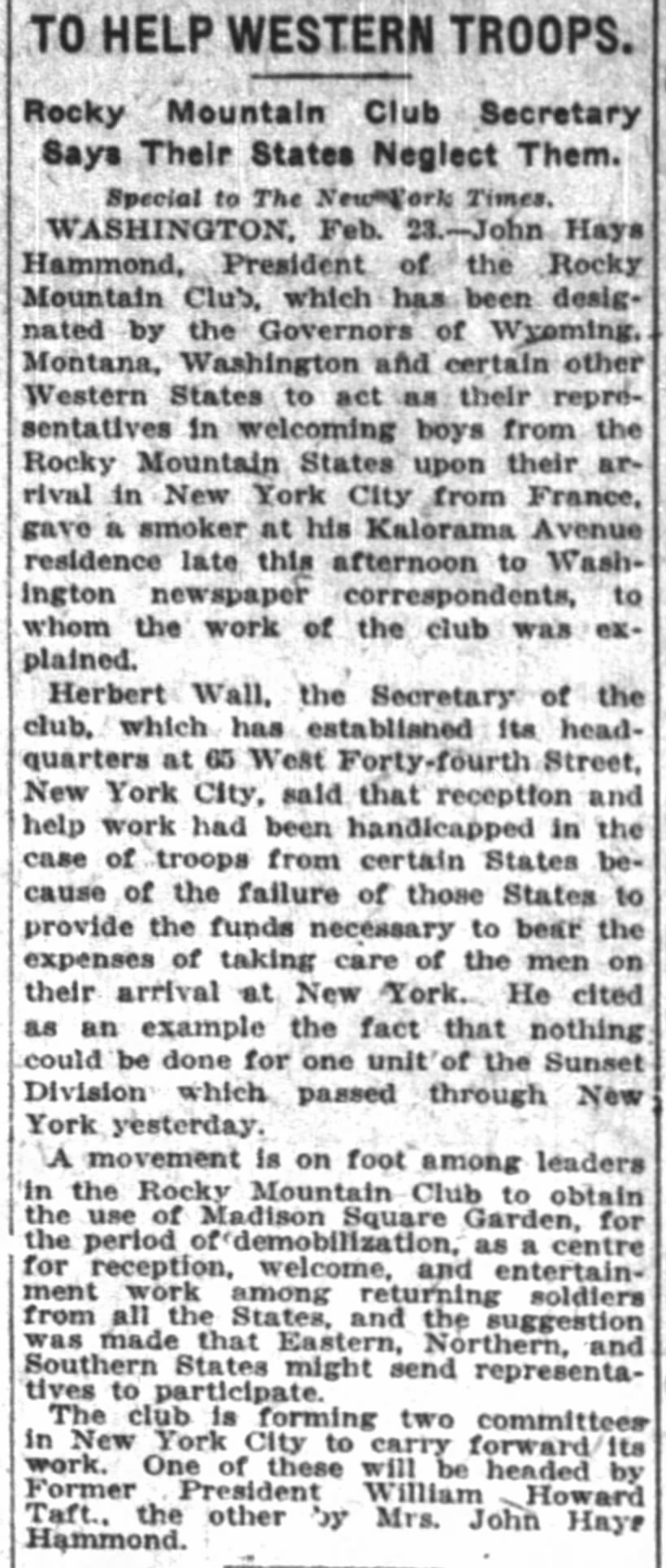
- Rocky Mountain Club in The New York Times of New York City, New York on February 24, 1919
- Formation: 1907
- Dissolved: 1928
- Type: Service club
- Purpose: To create good-fellowship among the members and advance the interests of the Rocky Mountain States
- Headquarters: New York, New York
- Official language: English
- President: John Hays Hammond
- Key people: Directors: W. B. Thompson, A. J. Seligman, John Campbell Cory, B. B. Taylor, Frederick Russell Burnham, and J. J. McEvelly. Theodore Roosevelt was a prominent member along with U.S. Senator's Thomas Kearns from Utah and W.A. Clark of Montana.

The Rocky Mountain Club was incorporated in New York City as an "Eastern Home of Western Men" with the purpose to "create good-fellowship among the members and advance the interests of the Rock Mountain States." John Hays Hammond was the only president. The original directors were: W. B. Thompson, A. J. Seligman, John Campbell Cory, B. B. Taylor, Frederick Russell Burnham and J. J. McEvelly. Theodore Roosevelt was a prominent member, along with U.S. Senator Thomas Kearns of Utah and U.S. Senator W.A. Clark of Montana.

Key dates in the history of the club include:

- January 20, 1907 - incorporated
- November 1, 1907 - Hotel Knickerbocker becomes the temporary headquarters
- December 28, 1913 - moved to the Algonquin Hotel at 65 West 44th Street, New York
- January 30, 1917 - pledges $500,000 to Belgian relief
- March 13, 1917 - begins recruitment effort to assist Roosevelt in forming a volunteer Army
- April 25, 1926 - plans world tribute to John Hays Hammond
- March 4, 1928 - disbands

== World War I ==
The Club was highly critical of Woodrow Wilson for not entering the war against Germany earlier. Once Roosevelt obtained permission from the U.S. Congress to form a volunteer Army to help in France, Major Burnham was enlisted by the Club to raise the troops in the Western states and to coordinate recruitment efforts. Wilson ultimately rejected Roosevelt's plan and the volunteer Army disbanded. During the war, the club also raised $500,000 in relief funds for Belgium war refugees, and after the war it played a prominent part in helping U.S. soldiers from Western States re-incorporate into American society.
