= Natalie Ascencios =

American artist

- Education: BA and BFA at the New School for Social Research at Eugene Lang College and Parsons The New School for Design.
- Known for: Painting
- Awards: Gold medal and two silver medals from The Society of Illustrators; First place in puppetry in the Henson design competition.
- Patrons: Oprah Winfrey, Jim Sheridan, CBS Studios

Natalie Ascencios is a painter and illustrator.

== Background ==
She received her BA and BFA at the New School for Social Research at Eugene Lang College and Parsons The New School for Design. Ascencios has taught drawing and painting at the School of Visual Arts at the graduate and undergraduate schools and has given talks on painting at Parsons The New School for Design, Maryland School of Art and various other institutions throughout the country. Ascencios has lived in New York City for fourteen years and currently keeps a studio in Brooklyn.

== Artistic works ==
Her work has appeared in The New Yorker, The New York Times Review of Books, Rolling Stone, Time, and many others. Ascencios' paintings can also be seen in the various competitive annuals of the Society of Illustrators, American Illustration, Communication Arts and Print annuals.

Collectors of her work include Sean Penn, Oprah Winfrey, director Jim Sheridan, CBS Studios, and the Jewish Repertory Theatre.

Ascencios is noted as the creator of two paintings depicting the literati of the 1920s. One, depicting members of the Algonquin Round Table is on permanent display at the Algonquin Hotel in New York City and the other hangs above the fireplace in the Library at the Martha Washington Inn, in Abingdon, VA.

== Awards ==
The Society of Illustrators has awarded her one gold medal and two silver medals. She also received first place in puppetry in the Henson design competition.

== Interviews ==
Magazine interviews with Ascencios appear in:

- Pro-Illustration, Vol. II
- Print, January/February 1999
- Communication Arts, January 1999
