= Algonquin Hotel =

Hotel in Manhattan, New York

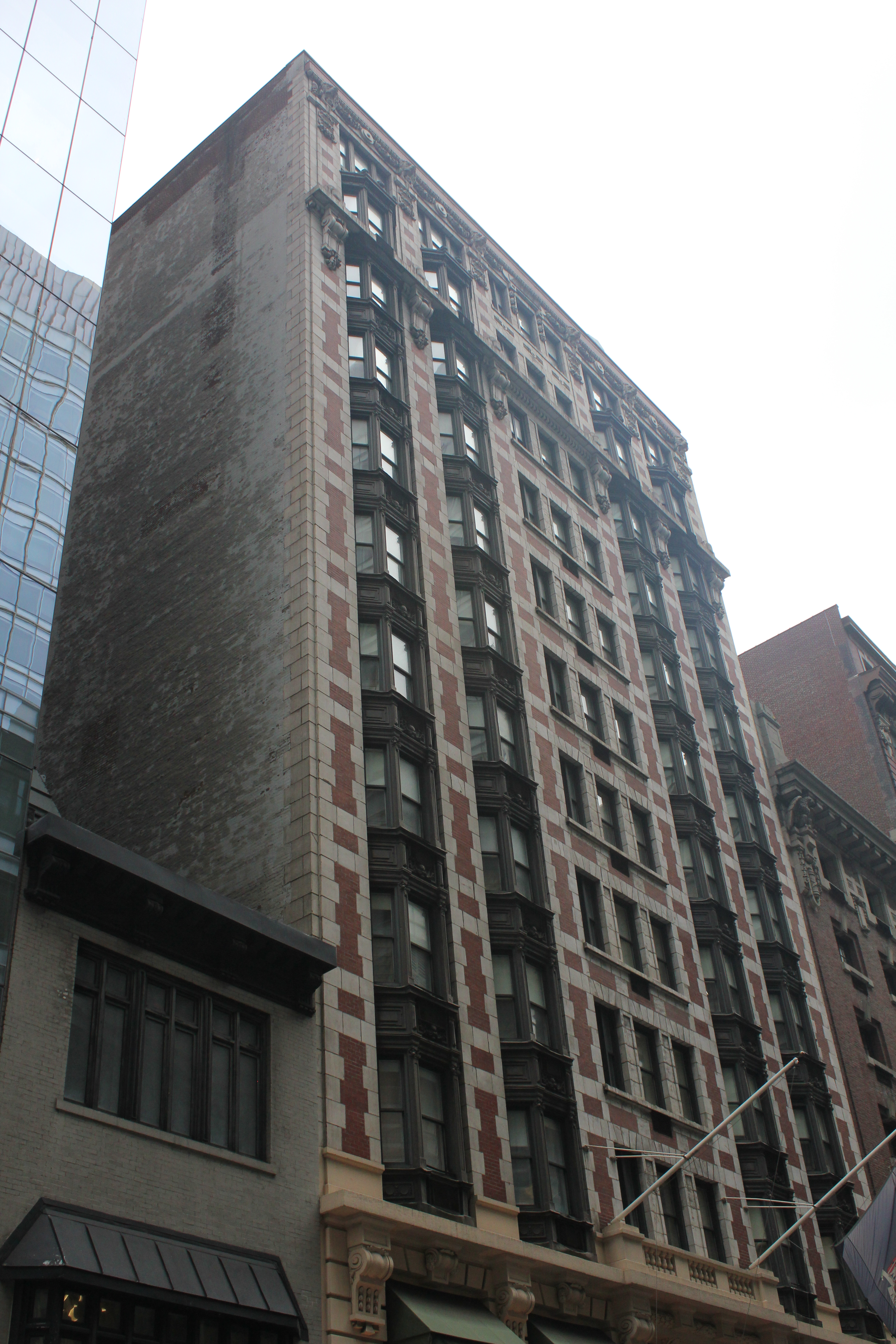
- Main facade of the hotel as seen from across 44th Street
- Interactive map of the Algonquin Hotel area
- Etymology: Algonquian peoples
- Hotel chain: Marriott International

General information
- Type: Hotel
- Architectural style: Renaissance Revival, Beaux-Arts
- Location: 59 West 44th Street, Manhattan, New York, United States
- Coordinates: 40°45′21″N 73°58′56.4″W
- Construction started: 1901
- Opened: November 22, 1902
- Renovated: 1947, 1989, 1997–1998, 2002–2004, 2008, 2012, 2022
- Owner: Cornerstone Real Estate Advisors

Height
- Height: 136 feet (41 m)

Technical details
- Floor count: 12
- Lifts/elevators: 2

Design and construction
- Architect: Goldwin Starrett
- Developer: Puritan Realty Company
- Main contractor: Thompson–Starrett Co.
- Known for: Algonquin Round Table

Other information
- Number of rooms: 156
- Number of suites: 25
- Number of restaurants: 1
- Number of bars: 1

Website
- algonquinhotel.com

The Algonquin Hotel (officially The Algonquin Hotel Times Square, Autograph Collection) is a hotel at 59 West 44th Street in Midtown Manhattan, New York City, United States. The 181-room hotel, opened in 1902, was designed by architect Goldwin Starrett for the Puritan Realty Company. The hotel has hosted numerous literary and theatrical notables throughout its history, including members of the Algonquin Round Table club during the early 20th century. Its first owner-manager, Frank Case, established many of the hotel's traditions, including an official hotel cat as well as discounts for struggling authors. The hotel is a New York City designated landmark and a member of Historic Hotels of America, a program of the National Trust for Historic Preservation.

The hotel building is mostly twelve stories high, except for the extreme western end, which is three stories high. The first two stories of the facade are made of rusticated limestone blocks, while the upper stories have a Renaissance Revival brick facade, with limestone, metal, and terracotta details inspired by the Beaux-Arts style. When the hotel opened, it contained a large restaurant and a smaller cafe, which later became the Oak Room cabaret. The annex contains the Blue Bar on its ground story, while the upper stories were formerly used as a clubhouse.

Although the Algonquin was originally intended as an apartment hotel, it had few long-term tenants. Frank Case leased the hotel in 1907 and converted it into a traditional lodging establishment, attracting many theatrical and literary guests. Case bought the hotel in 1927 and continued to operate it until his death in 1946. Afterward, onetime patrons Ben and Mary Bodne bought the hotel from Case's estate and operated it for another four decades. The Algonquin then passed to the Aoki Corporation in 1987, the Camberley Hotel Company in 1997, Miller Global Properties in 2002, and HEI Hospitality in 2005, undergoing a renovation every time it was sold. The Algonquin became part of the Marriott International chain's Autograph Collection brand in 2010, and it was sold to MassMutual subsidiary Cornerstone Real Estate Advisors in 2011.

== Site ==
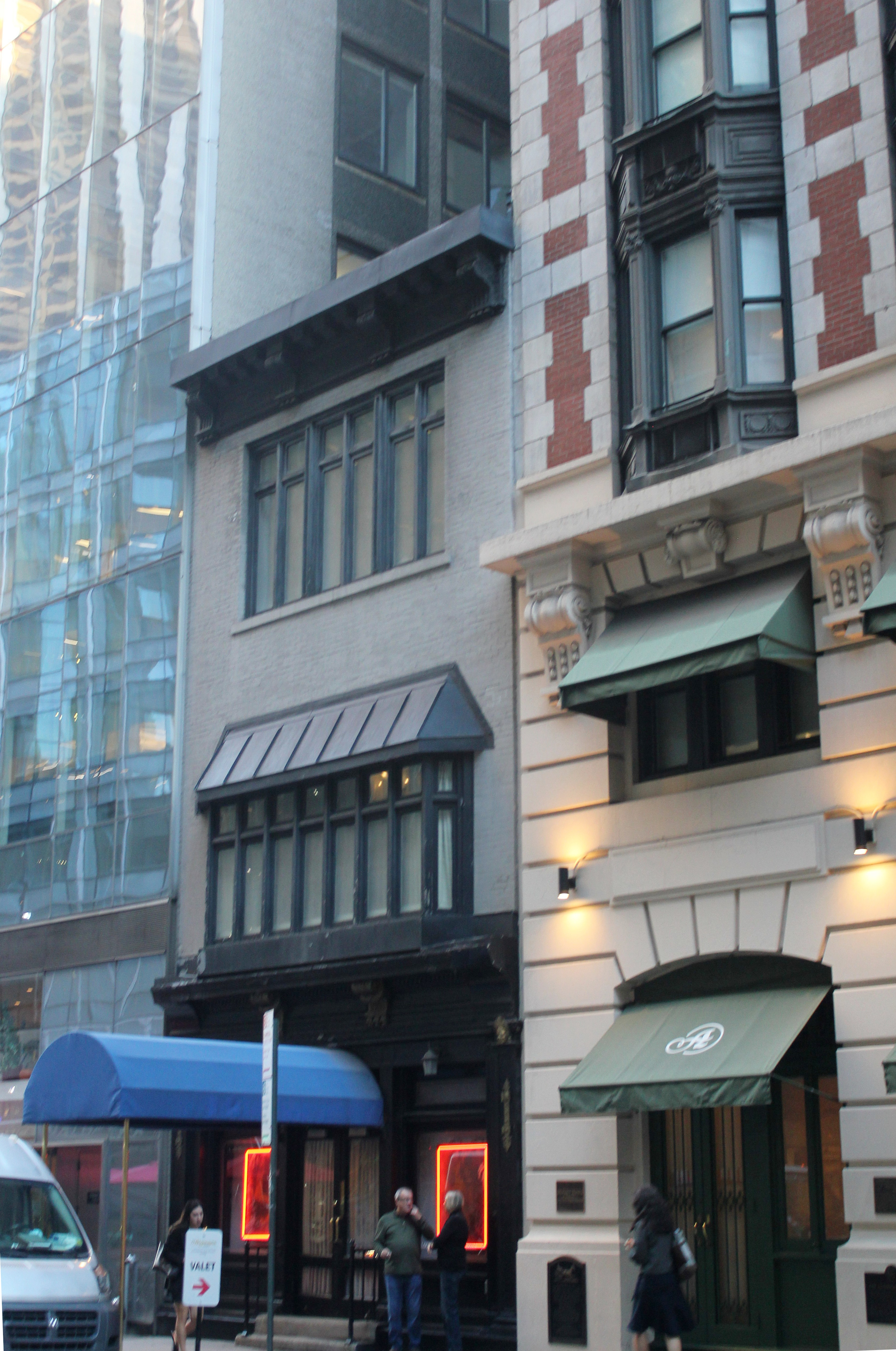
The hotel's annex at 65 West 44th Street, formerly a stable

The Algonquin Hotel is on 59 West 44th Street, on the north sidewalk between Sixth Avenue and Fifth Avenue, in the Midtown Manhattan neighborhood of New York City. The rectangular land lot covers 9,221 ft^{2} (856.7 m^{2}), with a frontage of 91.83 ft (27.99 m) on 44th Street and a depth of 100.42 ft (31 m). On the same block, the Iroquois New York, the Sofitel New York Hotel, the New York Yacht Club Building, and the Harvard Club of New York City building are to the east. Other nearby buildings include the Belasco Theatre to the west; Americas Tower to the northwest; 1166 Avenue of the Americas to the north; the New York City Bar Association Building and the Royalton Hotel to the south; and the Penn Club of New York building at 30 West 44th Street, the General Society of Mechanics and Tradesmen building, and the Hotel Mansfield to the southeast.

The adjacent block of 44th Street is known as Club Row and contains several clubhouses. When the hotel was developed in 1902, the area was filled with clubhouses, including those of the Harvard Club, Yale Club, New York Yacht Club, New York City Bar Association, and Century Association. Prior to the development of the Algonquin Hotel, the neighborhood contained a slaughterhouse, stables for stagecoach horses, and a train yard for the elevated Sixth Avenue Line. One of the stables became the Algonquin's three-story annex in 1904. There had been many stagecoach stables on 43rd and 44th Streets between Fifth and Sixth Avenues, but only a few of these buildings remained at the end of the 20th century. (Note: The New York City Landmarks Preservation Commission cites the block as having had two remaining stables in 1987, one of which was the Algonquin's annex. Christopher Gray of The New York Times gave a conflicting number of three stables in 2001, but he did not count the Algonquin's annex as one of the three stables.) By the 2010s, the hotel's annex was the only former stable on the block. The Algonquin is also one of six hotels on 44th Street between Fifth and Sixth Avenues, the largest concentration of hotels on a single block in New York City during the early 21st century.

== Architecture ==
The Algonquin Hotel was designed in 1902 by architect Goldwin Starrett of the Thompson–Starrett Company. Albert Foster, who headed the Puritan Realty Company, developed the hotel. The building is mostly twelve stories tall, except for the extreme western end, which was converted from a three-story stable. The 12-story section is shaped like an "H", with light courts facing west and east. In total, the hotel measures 136 feet (41 m) tall from ground level to the roofline.

=== Facade ===
The hotel building has a symmetrical facade. The first two stories of the facade are made of rusticated limestone blocks. The upper stories are largely clad with brick and are designed in the Renaissance Revival style, with limestone, metal, and terracotta details in a Beaux-Arts-inspired style. There are band courses on the facade above the second and tenth stories. The twelfth story was originally crowned by a cornice, which has since been removed.

The first story of the hotel's 12-story section is five bays wide and contains a limestone water table. The entrance is recessed within the center bay, and a marquee projects above the sidewalk in front of the main entrance. This marquee contains details such as old English lettering, wrought-iron scrolls, and a scalloped awning. There are two segmental arches on either side of the main entrance, all of which have canopies above them. There are glazed wooden doors in the westernmost bay, as well as metal service doors in the easternmost bay. The second-westernmost and second-easternmost bays contain tripartite windows. The second story is seven bays wide. The three center bays on the second floor have two-over-two sash windows, separated by motifs of tassels and shells. There is a small balustrade in front of the three center bays, with a flagpole extending diagonally above the street. The four outer bays have rectangular windows, separated by large brackets that support the band course above the second floor, and topped by keystones flanked by festoons.

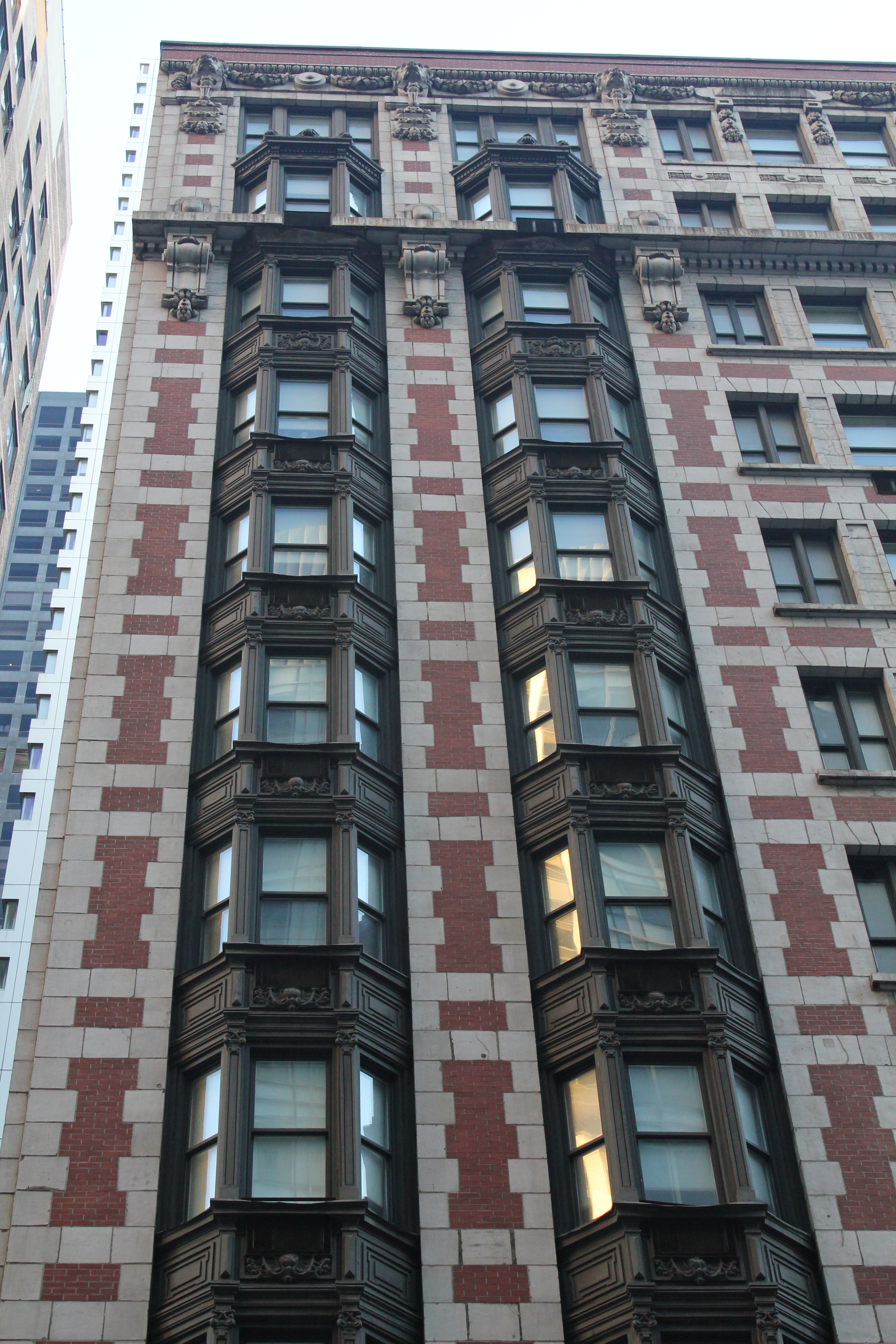
Bay windows on the upper stories

The third through eleventh stories are seven bays wide and are made of brick with limestone quoins. The four outermost bays on each story contain projecting bay windows with angular window frames, each consisting of a wide glass pane flanked by angled narrow sidelights. The angled windows were intended to increase each unit's exposure to natural light. There are panels, urns, and floral motifs in the angled sidelights; some of the panels have been replaced with air conditioning grilles. The band course above the tenth story protrudes from the facade; the underside of the band course contains dentils and scrolled console brackets. On the eleventh and twelfth stories, there are panels with roundels between each of the three middle windows; a similar panel is placed above the twelfth-story windows. At the twelfth story, the four outermost windows are flat rather than angled, as on the second story.

The western annex was originally a two-story stable but was expanded to a three-story brick structure in 1905. The first story contains a wooden storefront with metal decorations. There is a double door at the center of the storefront, with a canopy in front of the door. This entrance leads to the Blue Bar. The entrance is flanked by display windows, which in turn are topped by transom panels with metal grilles. On either side of the storefront are pilasters decorated with Native Americans' heads. The second story contains a projecting window with multiple panes, as well as angled sidelights. The third story is divided into three sections, above which is a cornice supported by brackets and decorated with lions.

=== Features ===
When the hotel opened in 1902, its public rooms were originally furnished in English oak with marble floors. The hotel originally contained a large restaurant known as the Pergola at ground level, as well as a smaller cafe. The Pergola restaurant occupied the west and north sections of the ground floor, with a kitchen on the same level. The Pergola contained a mural with outdoor scenes on one wall, as well as wood-paneled columns, which supported a latticework arch with flowers and acorn-shaped light fixtures. Although the Pergola could only fit three rows of tables, mirrors on the remaining walls gave the impression that the restaurant was larger than it actually was. The cafe's ceiling and walls contained terracotta and woodwork, and the lights were suspended from plaster holders on the ceiling.

There are multi-room suites and single rooms on the third through eleventh floors. The core of the H-shaped hotel contains two elevators. Above the second floor, the elevators open into a public hallway that connected all of the rooms on that floor. The core also contains a dumbwaiter leading from the hotel's kitchen; a set of stairs; and service rooms. The roof contained a patio and a roof garden, which were constructed before air conditioning became popular. There was also a 4,000-U.S.-gallon (15,000 L) water tower above the roof. The modern-day hotel contains 181 guest rooms and suites, as well as five meeting/conference rooms.

The annex became part of the hotel in 1904. The Pergola occupied the first floor, and the Rocky Mountain Club opened its clubhouse within the annex's second and third stories in 1913. The clubhouse had its own entrance on 44th Street, which ascended directly to the second story. The second floor contained a lounge, a reading room, and a cafe that connected with the hotel, while the third floor included the club's parlor, pool, and billiards rooms. The Rocky Mountain Club house was used by the Beethoven Association from 1922 to 1934. The third floor was then used as a ballroom for much of the 20th century, while the second floor became storage space. In 2012, the annex's second floor was renovated, becoming the John Barrymore Suite. The annex's first floor has contained the Blue Bar since 1997.

==== Ground level ====
===== Lobby =====
Originally, the front (south) portion of the ground floor contained a lounge with palms and flowers. When the hotel opened, the lobby included a barbershop, bar, and newsstand. The barbershop was closed during World War I, and the bar and newsstand were both removed in the 1990s. The lobby also contains wood paneling and a grandfather clock, which were both part of the original design. There was a glazed partition between the waiting area and reception desk. To the east of the lounge was a men's smoking room and club. These features were removed during several subsequent renovations of the hotel.

The modern-day lobby includes modern furniture designed in an early 20th-century style, as well as original furniture from the same time period. The walls and columns are stained to resemble chocolate-ebony wood. The space also contains black-and-white tiled floors, which were installed in 1998 in a vintage style; the floors are covered by imported British rugs. The lobby contains an oil painting of several Algonquin Round Table regulars, designed by Natalie Ascencios on the site of a former bar. Next to the painting is an imitation round table, for which guests can make reservations. There is a blue-and-red marble desk with a shelter for the hotel's cat (see Algonquin Hotel § Cats) and, near the eastern window, a shelf with a small staircase for the cat. Above the reception desk is an artwork composed of salvaged guest books, which was added in 2022. There is also a seating area across from the reception desk, where guests can pet and play with the hotel's cat.

===== The Rose Room and Round Table =====
The Rose Room, along with the smaller Oak Room, was part of the hotel's restaurant. During the 1920s, prominent intellectuals gathered daily for lunch in the Rose Room, and became known as the Algonquin Round Table. The space contained red wallpaper, a red ceiling, and chandeliers with orange velvet tubes. The Rose Room was demolished when the lobby was expanded in 1998. The Round Table Restaurant was relocated into the Rose Room's former space.

===== Oak Room =====
The Oak Room occupied the ground floor of the annex and was originally the Pergola's rear section. The Oak Room Supper Club opened within part of the Pergola in 1939, with European chanteuse Greta Keller as the room's first star. The club closed during World War II. The Oak Room reopened as a regular venue in either 1980 or 1981 under the management of cabaret operator Donald Smith. Its first regular and star was singer-pianist Steve Ross. Other performers who have appeared at the Oak Room include Julie Wilson, Mary Cleere Haran, Karen Akers, KT Sullivan, Barbara Carroll, Sandy Stewart and Bill Charlap, Diana Krall, Jessica Molaskey, Jamie Cullum, and John Pizzarelli. Andrea Marcovicci performed there for over 25 years, sometimes with her mother Helen Stuart Marcovicci. Harry Connick Jr. and Michael Feinstein performed at the Oak Room early in their careers. The singer Sylvia Syms collapsed and died on stage there during a performance in 1992.

The Oak Room spanned 4,000 square feet (370 m^{2}). New York Times critic Raymond Sokolov described the Oak Room as intimate and more masculine than the Rose Room. The space had theatrical equipment and lighting, as well as a grand piano. The Oak Room was not a large source of income, despite charging at least $100 per person (more if one had dinner, except for matinees). Howard Reich of the Chicago Tribune wrote in 1993 that the room's decorations, size, furnishings, and waiters' services evoked "an era when visitors sat back, sipped a drink, listened to music and savored life in an unhurried way".

The Oak Room permanently closed as a cabaret nightclub in 2012, and a portion of the room was converted into a private breakfast room for Marriott Reward Elite customers. As of 2022, the Oak Room is a 1,650-square-foot (153 m^{2}) conference room with space for 105 guests in a theater-style arrangement. The Oak Room also contains a movable partition, which can split the space into two rooms, each with a capacity of 40. The room retains its original woodwork, and its ceiling contains curving metal light fixtures.

===== Blue Bar =====
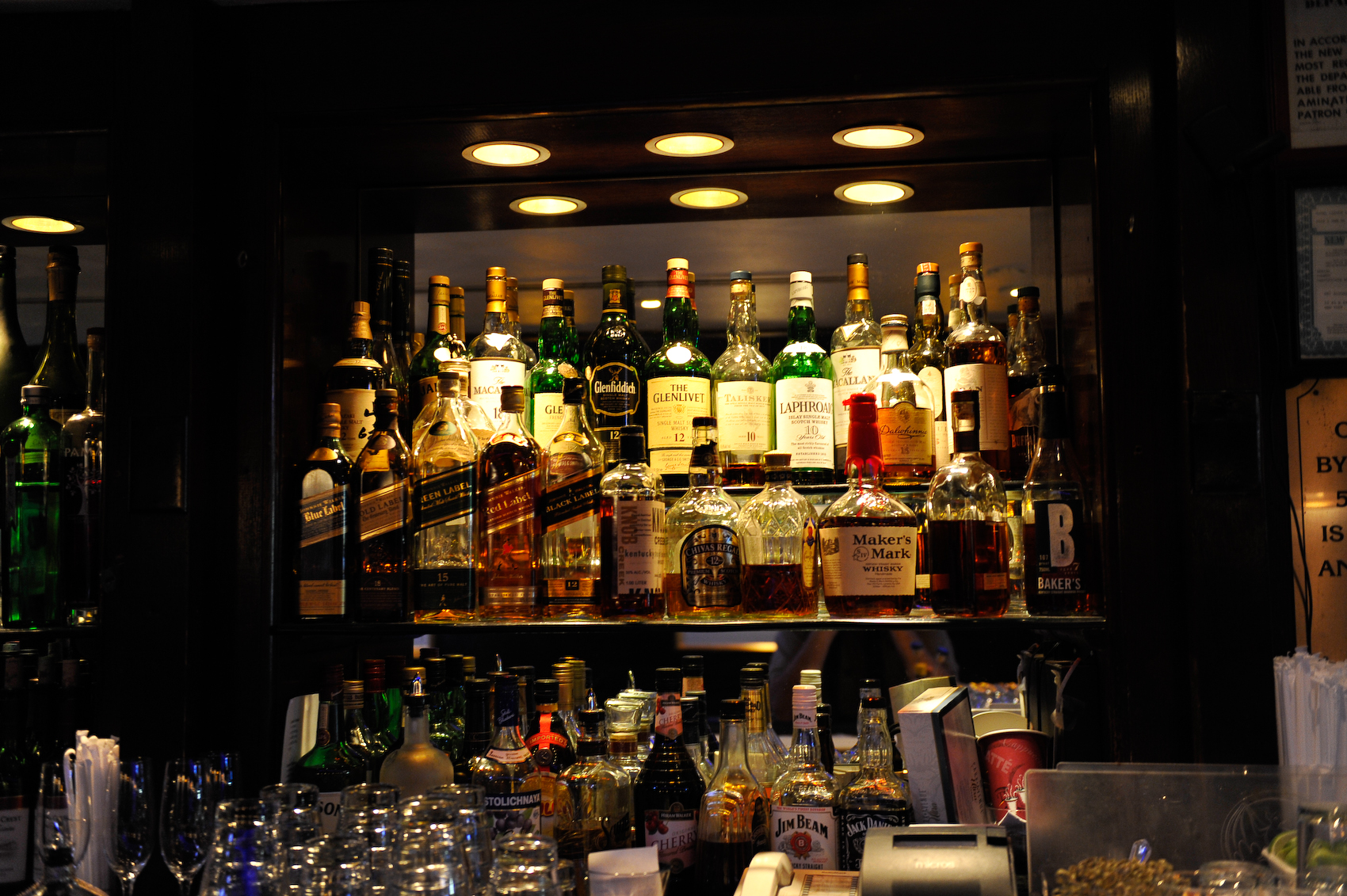
The Algonquin Hotel's bar

The hotel's Blue Bar has operated since 1933, following the end of Prohibition in the United States. Originally, the Blue Bar was placed in a niche behind the reception counter. The niche was closed and converted to storage space by the 1980s. The Blue Bar relocated to the annex in 1997, with its own entrance from the street. The New York Times wrote in 2000: "The Blue Bar is frequented by widows and well-traveled gentlemen with a predilection for theater." In 2012, the Blue Bar was renovated and expanded into part of the space formerly occupied by the Oak Room. The expanded Blue Bar contained blue lighting and blue-toned backlit bookshelves, with black-and-white floors that resembled those in the main reception area. The Blue Bar was relocated to the main lobby in 2022. The modern bar contains design elements similar to those added in the 2012 renovation, but the rear of the bar can be cordoned off for private parties.

==== Rooms and suites ====
The rooms and suites were originally arranged in square groups, each with its own hallway connecting to the elevators and stairs at the core. The largest suites available in the hotel contained a private hallway, a sitting room, a library or dining room, three bedrooms, and three bathrooms. Each unit originally contained mahogany woodwork and waxed-oak floors. Sliding doors separated the parlors and bedrooms in each suite; the master bedrooms were illuminated by the bay windows on the facade. Unusually for hotels of the time, each bedroom had its own bathroom, with a shower, hot and cold water, and electric lights. Except for bookshelves and fireplace mantels, the units were otherwise unfurnished. By the 2000s, the rooms had black-and-white wallpaper with framed cartoons from The New Yorker magazine. The hallways also contain cartoons taken from The New Yorker.

The modern-day hotel contains 156 rooms and 25 suites. Each suite has a name, and many suites are named after members of the Algonquin Round Table. For example, suite 506 is named for Robert Benchley, suite 610 for Harold Ross, suite 1106 for Dorothy Parker, and suite 1112 for Franklin Pierce "F.P.A." Adams. Suite 306, named for Edna Ferber, hosted annual meetings of the New York Drama Critics' Circle. Suite 1010 (now the Noël Coward Suite) was the owner's apartment for nearly one hundred years. The hotel's first owner-manager Frank Case lived there from 1902 until his death in 1946; the subsequent owners, Ben and Mary Bodne, lived there from 1947 until their respective deaths in 1992 and 2000. The largest suite in the hotel is suite 209 on the annex's second floor, which is named after John Barrymore and covers nearly 700 square feet (65 m^{2}).

== History ==
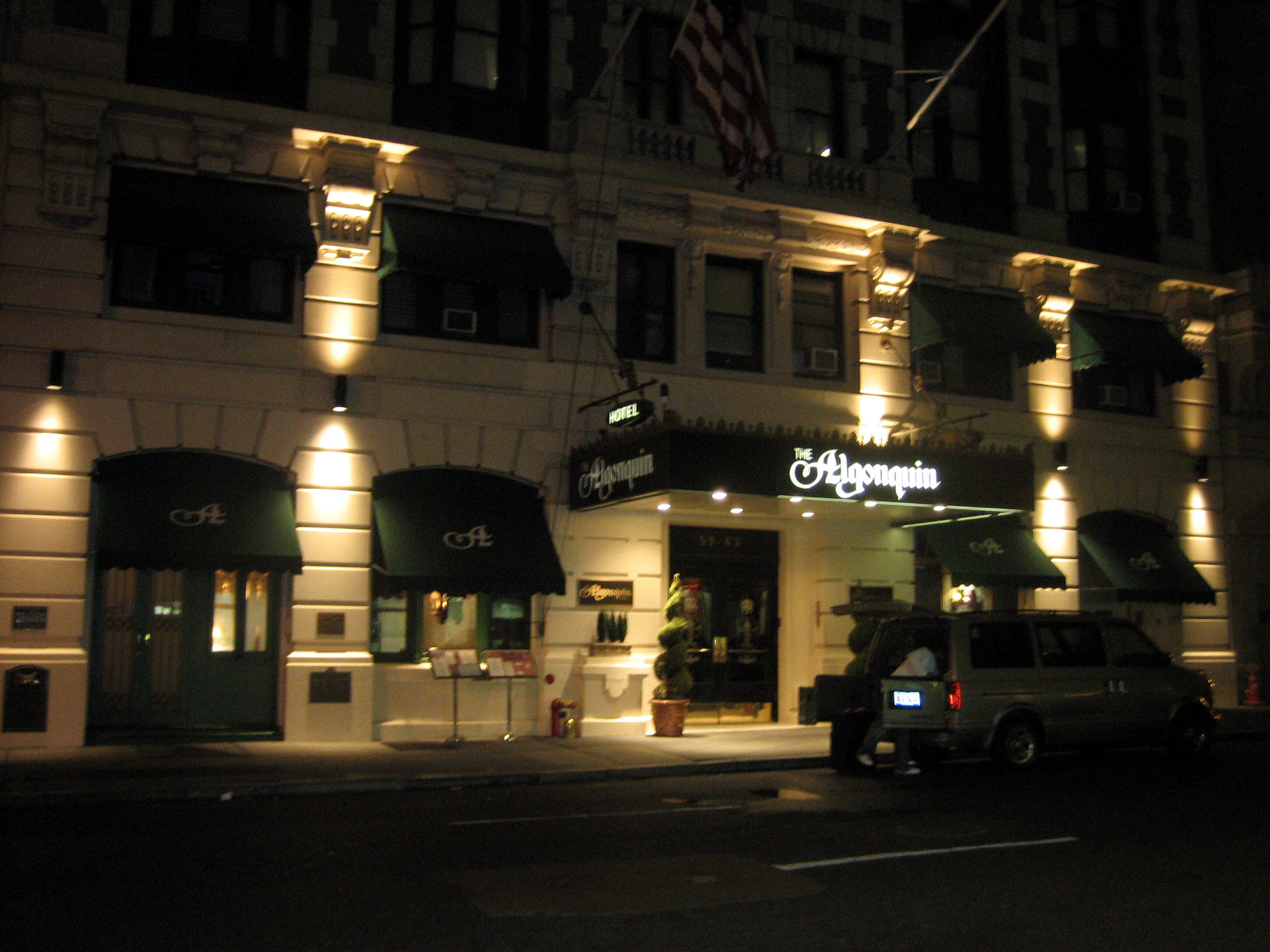
The Algonquin Hotel at night

=== Development and opening ===
==== Construction ====
The Algonquin was the third hotel to be built on the surrounding city block, after the Iroquois and Royalton, which had opened in 1900. In November 1901, the Puritan Realty Company bought a 7,200-square-foot (670 m^{2}) site at 59–63 West 44th Street from the Century Realty Company for $180,000. The Puritan Realty Company immediately announced plans to erect an apartment hotel on the site. The hotel would be similar in design to the then-newly completed Touraine, at 9–11 East 39th Street, and it would rent rooms and suites on year-long leases.

The owners hired 28-year-old Goldwin Starrett to design the hotel, his first project in Manhattan. Starrett's firm, the Thompson–Starrett Company, was to build the hotel for $500,000 or $600,000. The Puritan Realty Company acquired a $250,000 loan from the Century Realty Company at the end of 1901. Albert T. Foster and Ann Stetson Foster obtained a majority ownership stake in the Puritan Realty Company in February 1902. At the end of the month, the company submitted plans to the New York City Department of Buildings for an unnamed 12-story hotel, to be built on the north side of 44th Street east of Sixth Avenue. The Thompson–Starrett Company completed the hotel within a seven-month period, between April and November 1902.

Originally, the hotel was to have been known as the Puritan; there are conflicting explanations for how it received the Algonquin name. The Fosters hired Frank Case as a clerk in late 1902, a few weeks before the hotel opened. According to one account, Case believed the "Puritan" name was too pompous and evocative of European influences. Case reportedly advocated for an American name, and he persuaded the Fosters to rename the hotel after discovering that Algonquian Native Americans had been the first residents of the area. Another possible derivation is that Ann Foster named the hotel the Algonquin to complement the nearby Iroquois, which was also named after a Native American tribe. The historian John Tauranac, which attributed the "Algonquin" name to Case, claimed that the Algonquin had been named before the Iroquois was. Either way, the Algonquin had been planned with a gentlemen's billiards room, but, under Case's supervision, that room was converted to a kitchen.

==== Early years ====
The hotel opened on November 22, 1902, and was originally intended as a long-term hotel. At the time of the hotel's opening, 75 percent of the units were occupied. The Algonquin had amenities that were considered modern for its time, such as trained servants, in-suite telephones, heating, and plumbing. Guests could use the phones in their rooms to contact the hotel's concierge or to order food from the restaurant à la carte. They could also pay $7 a week (equivalent to $260 in 2025) to hire their own servants, or $12 a week (equivalent to $447 in 2025) to have food delivered to their rooms. Annual rent ranged from $420 (equivalent to $15,600 in 2025) for a single room to $2,520 (equivalent to $93,800 in 2025) for a three-bedroom suite. Guests could also use the rooms and suites for a short term, paying a nightly rate that ranged between $2 for a single room and $10 for a three-bedroom suite. For an extra daily fee of $1, guests were allowed to hire their own servants.

The Puritan Realty Company agreed in February 1903 to sell the Algonquin Hotel to two doctors, Andrew H. Smith and his son Davison W. Smith, for about $800,000; the Smiths took title that November. In partial exchange for the hotel, the Smiths sold a building at the corner of Madison Avenue and 42nd Street. Albert Foster continued to hold a lease on the Algonquin Hotel, paying $45,000 a year in rent. When the Algonquin opened, it was near six clubhouses, as well as the upscale Delmonico's and Sherry's restaurants. By early 1903, the Algonquin and other buildings on the block suffered from water shortages because of the large number of businesses in the area.

Meanwhile, the Fosters had become estranged. Ann Foster sued Albert in June 1904 to acquire the Algonquin's lease, claiming she was the true leaseholder and that she had spent $50,000 to furnish the hotel. A New York state judge subsequently appointed Albert as the hotel's receiver. Ultimately, Case took over the day-to-day operations, Albert was assigned the lease and all objects in the hotel, and Ann acquired the building itself (notwithstanding the fact that it had already been sold to the Smiths). The Algonquin did not attract many long-term tenants in its early years. According to Case, the hotel catered to "many well-known families from Newport, Bar Harbor and Narragansett", who stayed there twice a year for short periods. The hotel bought a two-story stable at 65 West 44th Street in 1904 and built another floor above the stable the next year.

=== Case operation ===
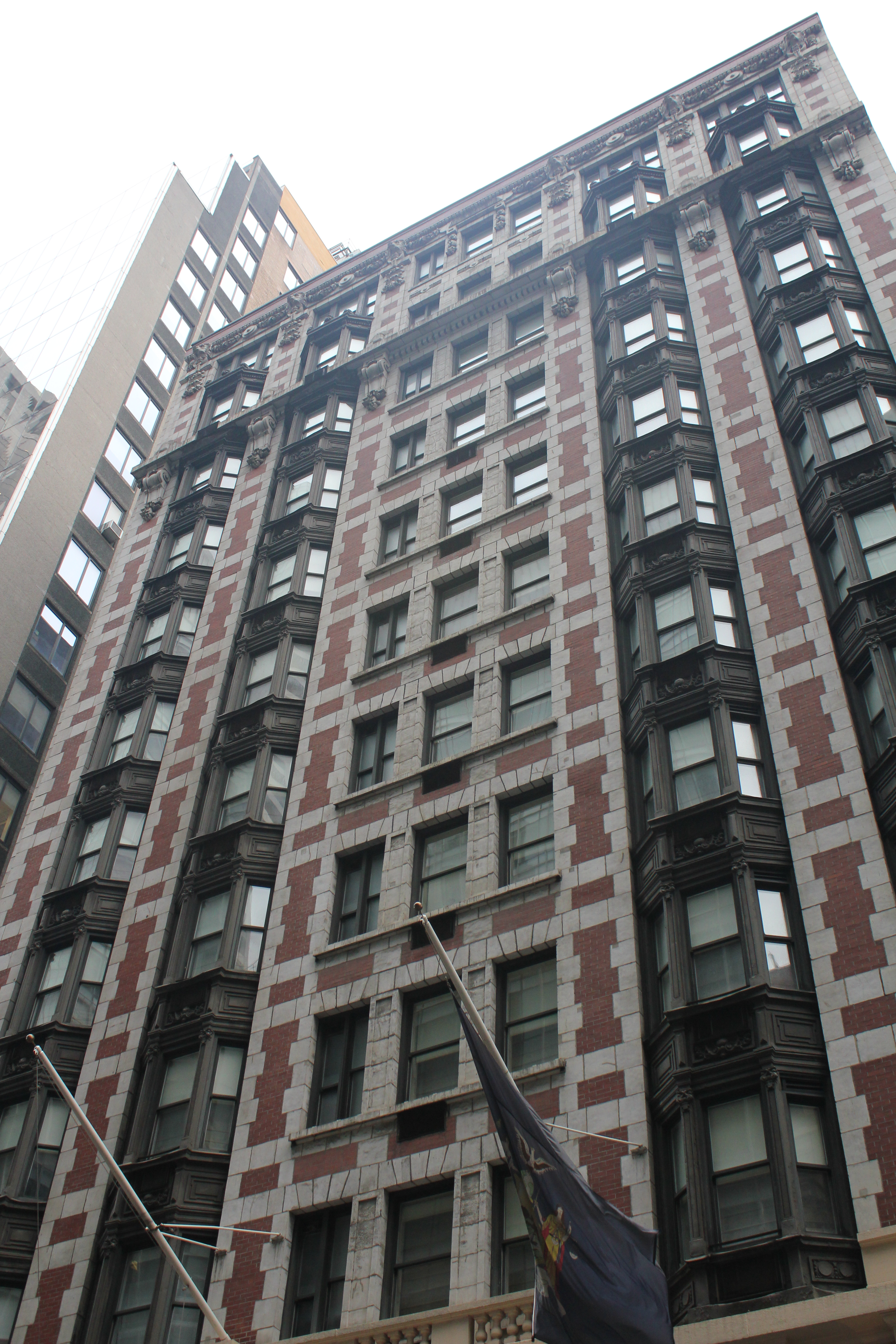
The hotel as viewed from across 44th Street

By the late 1900s and early 1910s, the surrounding neighborhood was rapidly developing into an entertainment district. The New York Hippodrome opened directly across 44th Street in 1905, which Case described as "an important event for us". Manhattan's theater district also shifted to Times Square during the first decade of the 20th century; several Broadway theaters, including the Belasco, Broadhurst, Forty-fourth Street, and Winthrop Ames (now Hayes), were developed on 44th Street in the 1900s and 1910s. Case took over the hotel's lease in 1907 and decided to operate the Algonquin as a short-term hotel. He lived there with his wife Caroline and their children Margaret and Carroll. Shortly after Carroll was born in 1908, Caroline died, and the hotel's staff helped Frank raise his children at the hotel.

==== Literary heyday ====
The Algonquin soon became a "theatrical and literary mecca", according to the New York City Landmarks Preservation Commission (LPC), and it was also the first major hotel in New York City to accept unaccompanied female guests. Under Case's management, the Algonquin gained a reputation for hospitality toward struggling authors, actors, and producers, which contributed to the hotel's popularity among theatrical and literary figures. For instance, Case paid playwright Eugene Walter's railroad fare when the latter was a guest at the hotel, and Case allowed guests to defer payment of their bills. The Toronto Star wrote: "Through the years, the hotel has played an important role in keeping various (literally) starving artists and actors alive until their next job, their future book or Broadway hit."

The hotel's restaurant caught fire in February 1909. After Andrew Smith died in 1910, the hotel's ownership was split equally between his daughter Juliet E. Smith and his wife Jane Wells. The annex caught fire the same November, destroying Frederic Thompson's residence on the top story. The Rocky Mountain Club leased the Algonquin's three-story annex in May 1913, and Frederick J. Sterner remodeled the annex into a clubhouse, which opened that December. Case had a negative perception of speakeasy operators, and he closed the hotel's bar in 1917, saying he did not want to fund his children's college tuition with "saloon money". Within two years of its closure, a soft-drink bar had been added.

Following World War I, the hotel became a meeting place of the Algonquin Round Table, a group of actors, critics, wits, and writers, between 1919 and 1929. In addition, the Beethoven Association moved into the hotel's annex in 1922, staying there for twelve years. By the early 1920s, the Algonquin had become popular as a short-term residence for "Hollywood stars and Broadway producers". The Algonquin's success prompted Case to consider opening a similar hotel in Hollywood in the early 1920s.

==== Case ownership ====
Case bought the property in 1927, paying Andrew Smith's family $1 million. By then, the hotel contained 250 rooms. The hotel's Blue Bar opened in 1933, sixteen years after the original bar had closed. The Algonquin retained its popularity in the literary and theatrical industries; Case wrote in 1938 that it was not uncommon to see "five or six or seven well-known writers" at the Algonquin simultaneously. After the New York Drama Critics' Circle was founded at the Algonquin in 1935, it started hosting annual dinners at the hotel, wherein the group voted on the best play of the year. The hotel's staff joined a labor union affiliated with the American Federation of Labor in 1939, and they went on strike. Case negotiated a contract with the labor union that April, and the Algonquin's staff have remained unionized since then. In addition, the Algonquin Supper Club, the hotel's first-ever nightclub, opened in November 1939.

Case remained the owner and manager of the hotel until his death in June 1946. Chemical Bank, the trustee of Case's estate, placed the Algonquin for sale that August. At the time, the hotel had 192 units (143 of which were suites), as well as a bar and three restaurants.

=== Bodne ownership ===
In September 1946, Chemical Bank sold the hotel for $1 million to Ben Bodne of Charleston, South Carolina, who acquired the title to the property the next month. Bodne and his wife Mary had stayed there during their honeymoon in 1924, and Ben had promised Mary that he would one day buy the hotel. The hotel's plumbing had not been updated in two decades, and the basement had sustained water damage following the demolition of the Hippodrome several years prior. Bodne owned the hotel for the next four decades, occupying the suite in which Case and his family had once lived. Ben and Mary Bodne had two daughters, both of whom were married; their respective husbands both eventually became managers of the hotel. Ben and Mary's sons-in-law Sidney Colby and Andrew Anspach initially were hired as the hotel's vice presidents. Colby became the hotel's manager in 1951, and Anspach had taken over as managing director by the 1970s.

==== Initial modifications ====
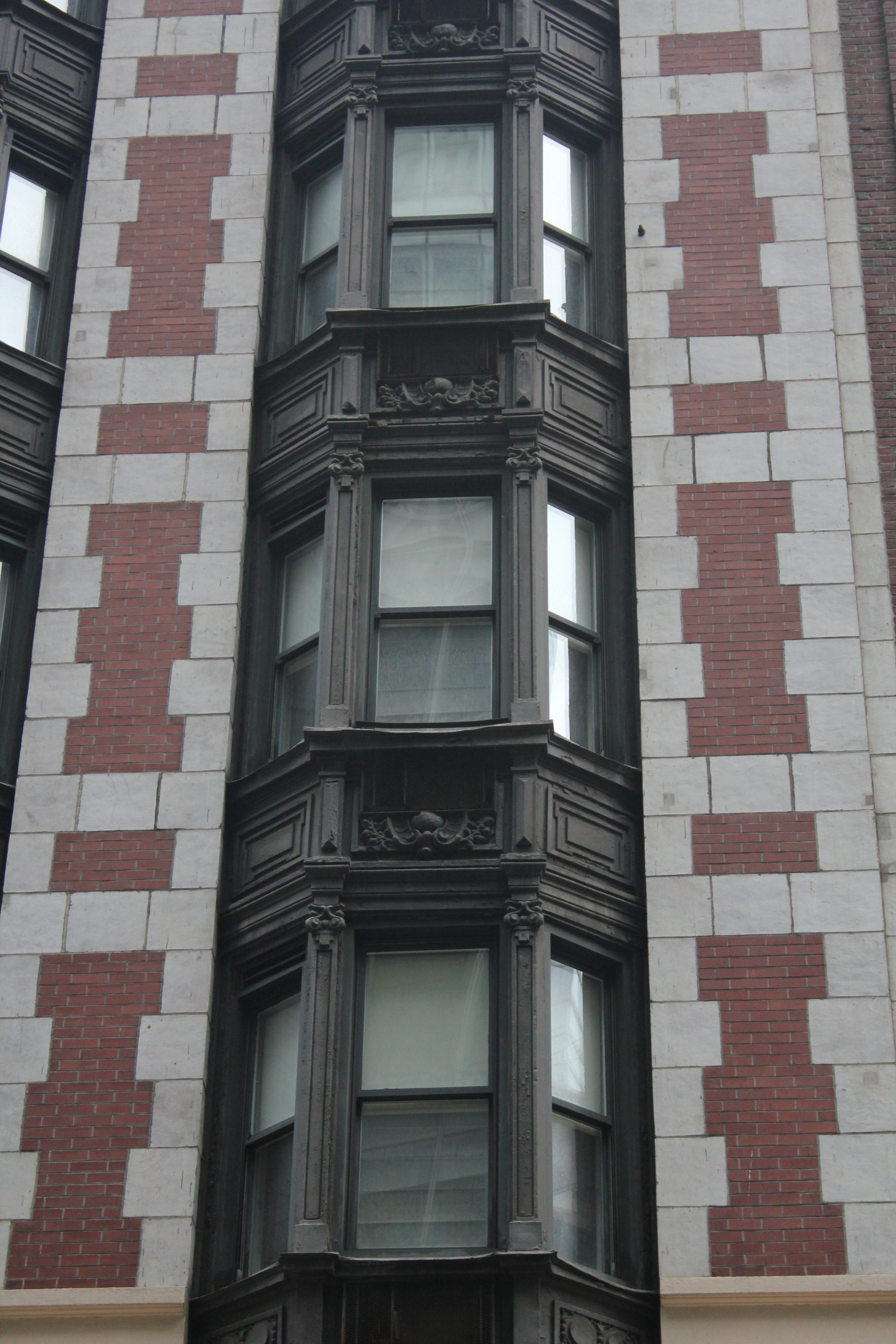
Detail of the bay windows

Bodne announced plans in 1947 to renovate the hotel for $100,000. John Martin, the hotel's general manager of nine years, helped Bodne with the improvements, which included refurbishing all the rooms and adding a refrigeration plant. The renovations also included new air-conditioners and televisions in each room. Bodne replaced 300 chairs, beds, and tables with new furnishings in the same style, and he also repainted the walls to their original colors.

Under Bodne's ownership, the Algonquin became the first hotel in New York City to replace its hotel keys with electronic key cards. The hotel was among the first in New York City to give walkie-talkies to its staff and install smoke detectors in its rooms. After Bodne's purchase, the hotel continued to host literary and theatrical meetings, including those of the Drama Critics' Circle; the Outer Circle, composed of theatrical critics who did not live in the New York metropolitan area; and the PEN Club, composed of fiction writers. Colby said in 1952 that the Algonquin "often seems like a small, non-political United Nations" because guests came from around the world.

Bodne conducted additional renovations through the 1950s and 1960s, ordering new furniture and draperies in the same style as the hotel's original furnishings. The hotel's rooms were redecorated in an 18th-century English style, with bedspreads and lamps from department stores. Bodne also installed refrigerators and TV sets concealed within walnut bureaus; the TVs and refrigerators could be removed as needed. The hotel received modern wiring, plumbing, and heating systems; the new heating system reduced the hotel's heating costs by 25 percent. Around 1963, stage designer Oliver Smith redecorated the hotel's Rose Room with white, gilded, and rose draperies, designing the room in a manner similar to a stage set. Most guests were unaware of the renovation work, as it was largely conducted at night.

==== Changing clientele ====
By the early 1960s, major literary and theatrical figures were beginning to favor more upscale hostelries, and "the poorer actor could not afford Algonquin prices". Even so, the bar and restaurants were often full. The Algonquin still had a relatively small capacity compared to newer hotels, and it had only two elevators, one of which was used for freight during off-peak periods. Unlike other hotels with automatic elevators, the Algonquin still employed elevator operators; when the hotel's elevators were replaced in 1965, the new elevator cabs were deliberately designed without space for automatic buttons. In addition, it did not offer gaudy entertainment or host private parties; the only visible symbol of luxury was the dining room's crystal chandelier, which the hotel had bought in the 1930s for $25. The Algonquin's staff knew many of the guests by name, and its valet was friends with many of the hotel's theatrical guests. Following an extensive marketing campaign in Europe in the mid-1960s, the Algonquin became popular among European travelers. To cater to these new guests, Smith designed a new marquee above the entrance, which was installed in 1965. The New Yorker magazine, which had been established at the hotel, hosted a party for the Algonquin's 75th anniversary in 1977.

By the late 1970s, the Algonquin employed close to 200 staff members, about one for each unit on average. The hotel remained popular, despite not offering any weekend discounts, as newer hotels did. The Algonquin also ran few formal advertisements, instead obtaining most of its business through word-of-mouth marketing. Nightly room rates were relatively cheap, ranging from $43 to $80, so the hotel had many repeat guests. Staff recorded each guest's needs and preferences on index cards. Many of the hotel's staff were employed there for several years, long enough to memorize guests' preferences. The "Algonquinites list" comprised nearly 5,000 names.

The hotel's Oak Room reopened as a cabaret venue at the end of 1980. The units were refurbished again in the mid-1980s. The Algonquin's room rates continued to be cheaper than those at the city's other hotels. Even so, Ward Morehouse III wrote in 1981 that the Algonquin "just never seems to worry about the so-called 'bottom line', or profit picture, despite the fact it is one of the most reasonably priced first-class hotels in the city."

=== Aoki ownership ===
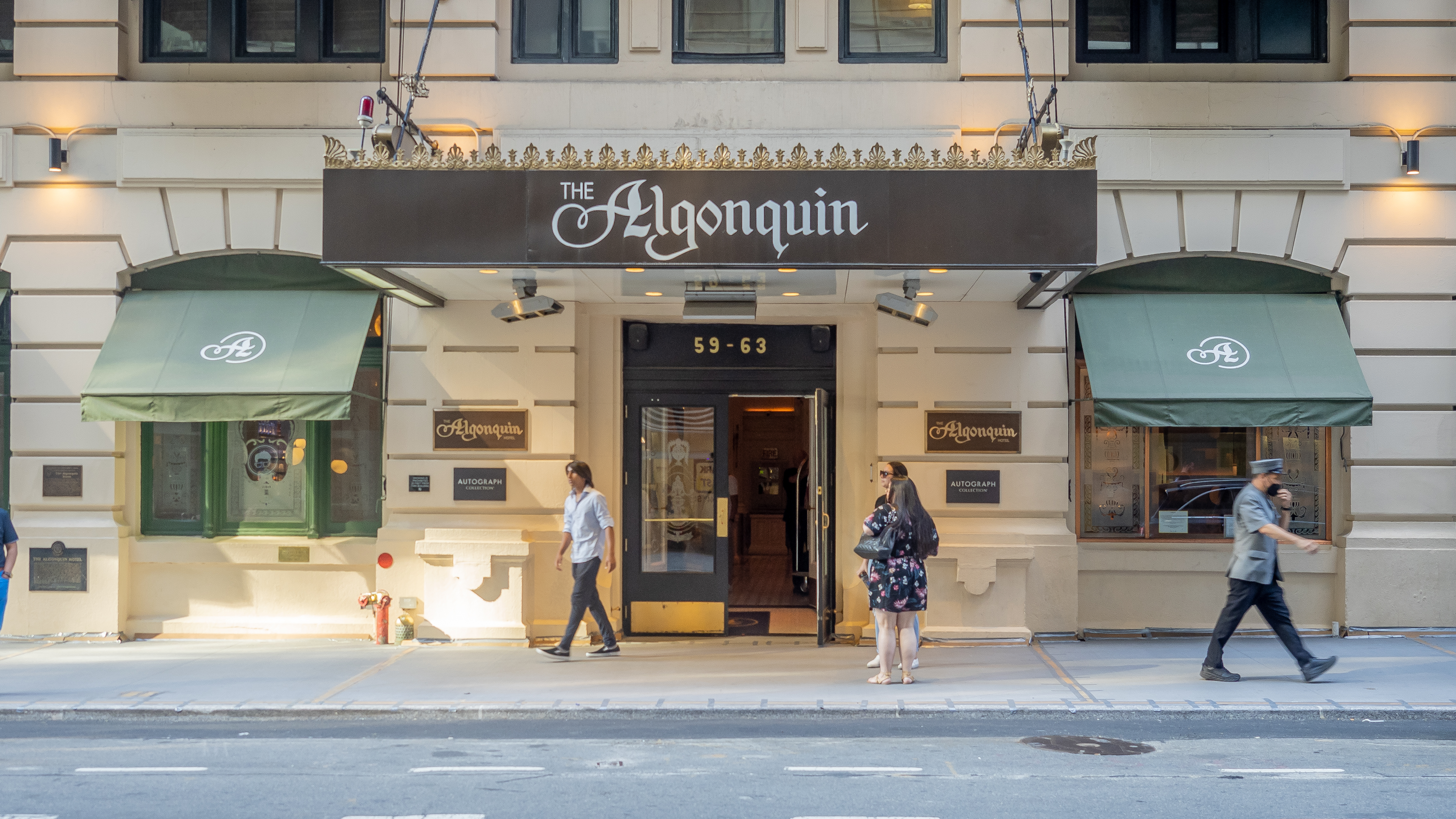
View of 44th Street entrance

Bodne sold the hotel to Caesar Park Hotels, a subsidiary of Japanese company Aoki Corporation, for $29 million in June 1987. The sale came four months after Bodne had publicly denied a rumor that he was considering selling the hotel; he had said that he would relinquish the Algonquin "the day it needed self-service elevators". Aoki's purchase marked the first time that a company or a foreign entity had owned the hotel, and it was part of a trend of foreign investment in New York City buildings in the late 1980s. Ben Bodne continued to live at the Algonquin until he died in 1992, after which Mary Bodne remained there until her own death in 2000. Aoki promised to preserve the hotel's traditions, including maintaining the Oak Room and Rose Room as dining spaces. The hotel's elevators were in dire need of upgrades; decades earlier, writer James Thurber had joked that the hotel's literary guests "became writers while waiting for the elevators".

In 1989, Aoki began renovating the hotel to designs by architect John Ciardullo and designer Laura Gottwald. Tishman Realty & Construction carried out the project. The hotel's 170 rooms were redecorated in a Victorian style, with wooden trim and sliding doors in each room, as well as wallpaper, tapestries, and fabrics with early-20th-century designs. Some of the rooms on the second floor were removed to make way for an expansion of the hotel's meeting rooms. One of the suites was renamed the Round Table Suite and filled with Algonquin Round Table memorabilia. The old operator-controlled elevators were supplanted by self-service elevators, and the electrical systems were replaced as well. The owners installed a plaque in the lobby, describing the hotel's history; the plaque had to be remade because it contained so many spelling and grammatical errors.

The renovation took five years to complete, as the contractors only renovated three floors at a time; it ultimately cost $20 million. The Algonquin was one of several hotels around Times Square that were developed or renovated in the late 1980s and 1990s. Arthur Kaptainis of the Montreal Gazette wrote that the project had "cleared the funny smells without stripping the lobby of its cushiony Edwardian elegance". The hotel was no longer known for its cheap room rates; the Gazette noted that the neighboring Hotel Iroquois charged much less. Even so, the Algonquin remained popular among those visiting nearby Broadway theaters. In 1995, Aoki added a James Thurber-themed suite to the Algonquin.

=== Camberley and Olympus ownership ===
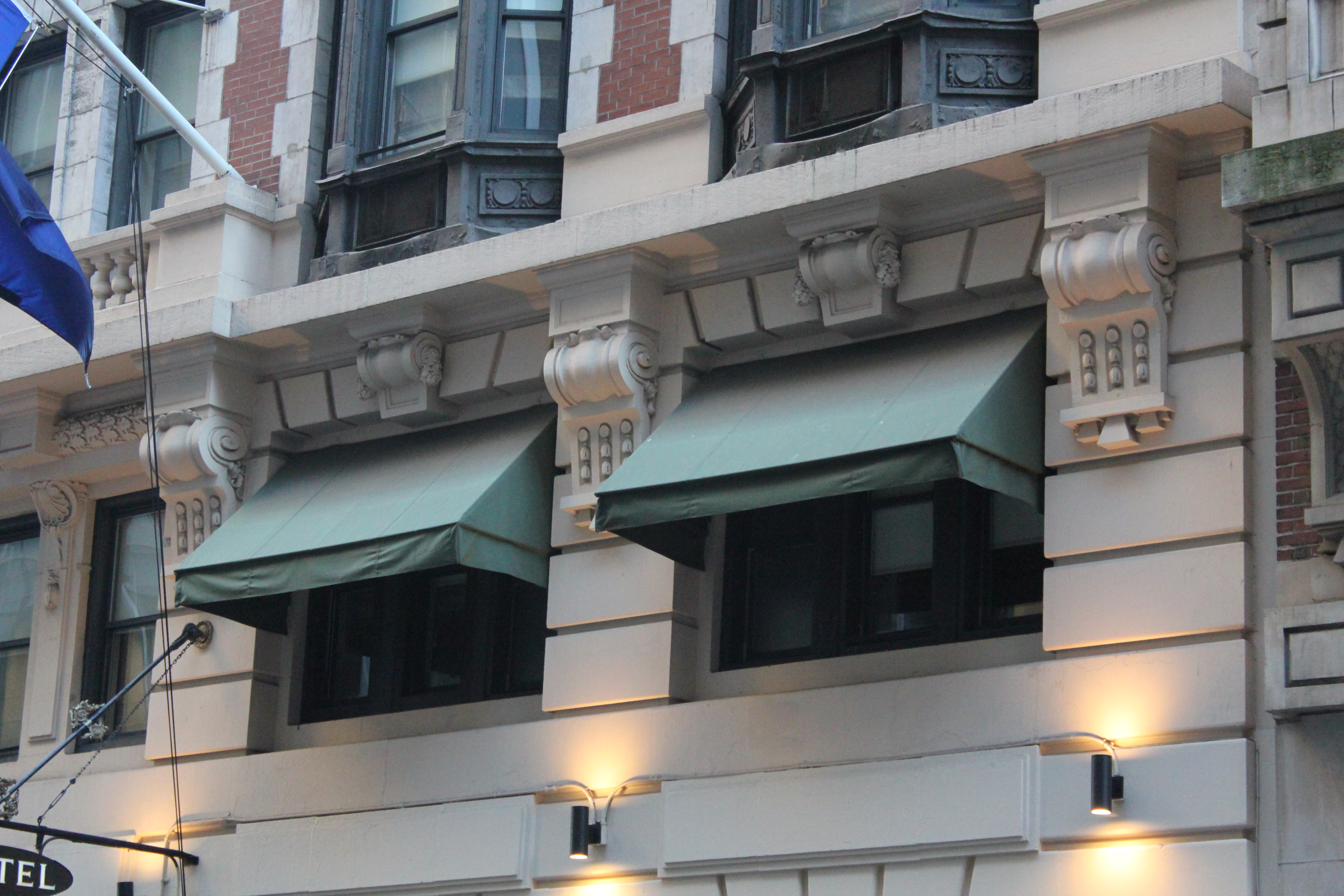
Detail of the second-story windows

In March 1997, the partnership of Atlanta-based Camberley Hotel Company and Dallas-based Olympus Real Estate bought the Algonquin. The two companies paid $30 million for the hotel, which had 165 units at the time. The bedrooms were small by modern standards, and the Algonquin also had extremely slow elevators, mouse infestations, constant hot-water interruptions, and bad food. Camberley planned to renovate the hotel, raise nightly room rates from $180 to $200, and resell the Algonquin in five to seven years. The new owners were initially unaware of the hotel's historical significance, as Camberley president Ian Lloyd-Jones said: "We thought we were looking at a normal piece of real estate with a great location that had been underperforming in the hands of absentee owners for the last 10 years." The New York Observer wrote that, at the time of Camberley and Olympus's acquisition, "the publishing scene [had] long since dispersed".

Camberley officials announced plans to spend $4 million on a "discreet" renovation of the entrance and lobby. Some hotel regulars wrote letters to Lloyd-Jones, daring him "to change a thing". Camberley hired Alexandra Champalimaud to design the renovation, which ultimately cost $5.5 million. The hotel's owners demolished the Rose Room to make way for an expansion of the lobby, and they added eight standard rooms and one suite. Natalie Ascencios was also commissioned to create a painting of several Round Table members, which was then hung in the lobby. By the beginning of the 21st century, the Algonquin was one of several boutique hotels on that block of 44th Street, along with the Iroquois, Mansfield, and Sofitel. Camberley and Olympus placed the hotel for sale in January 2001, receiving bids from about 20 potential buyers. The hotel saw decreases in visitation following the September 11 attacks in 2001. Bernard Goldberg, who had been in contract to buy the hotel at the time, canceled his plans following the attacks.

=== Miller Global renovation ===
Miller Global Properties acquired the Algonquin from Camberley in June 2002 for an estimated $35 million. The Algonquin's visitor numbers largely recovered within two years of the attacks. Anthony Melchiorri was hired as the hotel's new general manager. Miller Global spent $3 million on renovating the hotel. When the hotel had been sold, the previous owner had relocated the first painting to the Martha Washington Inn in Virginia, so Miller Global hired Ascencios to create another painting of the Round Table's members. This painting was installed in the Oak Room in advance of the Algonquin's centennial. As part of the renovation, Miller Global closed the Algonquin entirely in June 2004; this was the first time that the Algonquin had been fully closed in its history. During the closure, Miller Global installed high-speed internet connections and flat-screen TVs in all of the hotel's rooms.

When the hotel reopened in August 2004, the owners offered discounts to guests who owned old hotel memorabilia, and the restaurant offered discounted lunches to authors. Melchiorri developed a $10,000 martini to mark the completion of the renovation. Bodne's grandson David Colby pushed for Miller Global executives to revive the hotel's literary traditions, saying: "The Algonquin has greater potential than 100 percent occupancy." The hotel also started lending iPods with audiobooks to its guests. Miller Global hired Cushman and Wakefield to find a buyer for the hotel in mid-2005.

=== Mid-2000s to present ===
The hotel was sold again to HEI Hospitality in October 2005. Under HEI's ownership, the hotel began lending Amazon Kindles to guests, in keeping with the hotel's literary traditions. HEI spent $4.5 million on yet another renovation of the hotel, completed in 2008, and they hired Gary Budge as the general manager. In September 2010, the Algonquin Hotel became affiliated with the Marriott International chain's Autograph Collection brand, becoming the Algonquin Hotel Times Square, Autograph Collection. The hotel retained several of its traditions, including its name and its cat. HEI continued to own the hotel but paid a franchise fee to become part of Marriott's rewards program. The affiliation with Marriott came amid an increase in tourism in New York City.

By mid-2011, HEI was negotiating to resell the hotel to MassMutual subsidiary Cornerstone Real Estate Advisors. Cornerstone bought the hotel that June for about $80 million, becoming the hotel's fifth owner in 15 years. In late 2011, Cornerstone announced that it would close the Algonquin for renovations for four months. The Algonquin was closed for renovations in February 2012, during which time the Oak Room was closed permanently. The hotel reopened that May after the renovations were completed. Due to the COVID-19 pandemic in New York City, the Algonquin was closed from March 2020 to April 2021. Stonehill Taylor further renovated the hotel in 2022, including the Algonquin Round Table, the Blue Bar, and the Oak Room. The hotel's round table was also restored in 2024.

== Traditions ==
=== Cats ===
The Algonquin Hotel has kept a cat in its lobby since the late 1920s. The practice was formerly thought to have originated in the 1930s, but a book by Frank Case indicates that he had cared for a cat named Billy until the feline's death in the 1920s. According to administrative assistant Alice de Almeida (the hotel's "chief cat officer"), the current practice started when the hotel took in a stray male cat that was originally named Rusty. When a guest was sick, Rusty frequently went to that guest's room and stayed there until they had recovered. Rusty was renamed Hamlet at the suggestion of John Barrymore, who at the time was performing on Broadway in the play Hamlet. Since then, all the male cats have been named Hamlet, while all the female cats have been named Matilda. It is not clear why female cats are named Matilda, but all the Hamlets are named after the original cat. The hotel has had eight Hamlets and three Matildas in its history. The Algonquin acquired its current cat, Hamlet VIII, in 2017.

The hotel's lobby contains two feline tree houses. The cat's collar interacts with an electric geo-fence, which prevents the cat from leaving the lobby, because the New York City Department of Health and Mental Hygiene does not permit animals in dining areas. The cat has received several gifts from visitors, including four oil paintings. Many people have visited the Algonquin specifically to see the hotel's cat. One of the male cats was featured in the illustrated book Algonquin Cat; (Note: For the book, see: Schaffner, Val (1995) [1980]. Algonquin cat: a Story. Wings Books. ISBN 978-0-517-14711-5 – via Internet Archive.) when that cat died in 1982, his obituary appeared in Variety magazine. Another cat, a female Ragdoll, was named 2006 cat of the year at the Westchester Cat Show.

Every August, the hotel holds a fundraiser with a feline fashion show featuring the hotel's cat. The fashion shows started in the 1930s and have raised money for such initiatives as the Mayor's Alliance for NYC's Animals. In addition, the hotel hosts birthday parties for its cat; these events have also served as fundraisers, such as in 2010, when Matilda III's fifteenth birthday raised money for North Shore Animal League America. The Wall Street Journal wrote that the cat's birthday party "is the kind of party where you would find [...] $20 Purrtinis for sale, made of Grey Goose vodka, lychee juice, coconut, white creme de cacao and lemon juice and advertisements for Reiki treatments for cats. It is also a party where you would see a cat dressed as a fruit basket..."

=== Other traditions ===
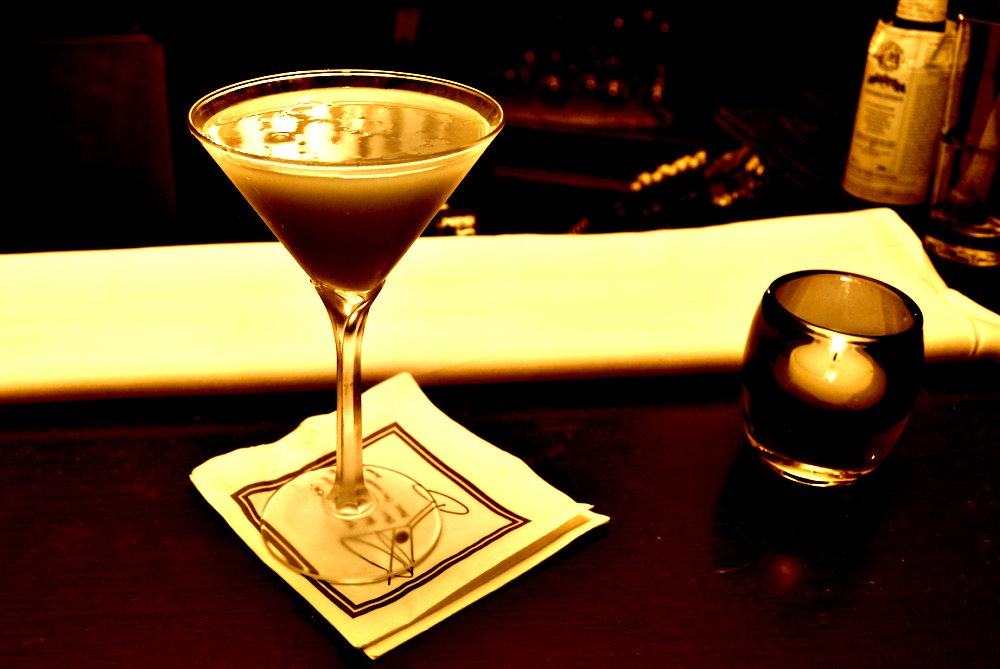
One of the drinks served at the Algonquin, a Maker's Mark Bourbon with mango puree

The hotel has an eponymous cocktail, composed of rye whiskey, Noilly Prat and pineapple juice. The $10,000 "Martini on the Rock" was added to the hotel's menu in 2004; it consists of a martini of the buyer's choice with a single piece of "ice", a diamond, at the bottom of the glass. This martini was developed by Anthony Melchiorri, the hotel's general manager at the time, though over a decade elapsed before anyone actually bought that drink. The Blue Bar's menu includes several cocktails that allude to the TV series Mad Men, in which the bar was featured. One bartender at the Algonquin, Hoy Wong, was believed to be the oldest bartender in New York state; by the time Wong retired in 2009, he was nearly 90 years old.

In the late 20th century, writers on tour could get one free night at the hotel in exchange for an autographed copy of their book. The practice has been amended to include a discount on standard room rates. Additionally, in 2009, the hotel offered discounted room rates to authors who had a draft manuscript and were experiencing writer's block.

== Notable guests ==
Among the Algonquin's early guests were actors Douglas Fairbanks, the Barrymore family, Beatrice Lillie, Raymond Hitchcock, Mary Pickford, and Elsie Janis. Ethel Barrymore lived at a suite at the Algonquin in 1905, and her maternal uncle John Drew lived there for 17 years. Luna Park developer Fred Thompson lived on the annex's top story, while impresarios Florenz Ziegfeld Jr. and Diamond Jim Brady frequented the hotel's cafe. Lady Gregory was the first female guest to smoke in the Algonquin's lobby in 1911, and Case later ejected Ruth Hale for smoking in the lobby. The Algonquin attracted vaudeville and Broadway performers and silent film actors through the 1920s. Authors such as H. L. Mencken and Gertrude Stein lived there, and Tallulah Bankhead rented a room as a teenager. Playwright Sinclair Lewis frequently ate within the Oak Room as well. The hotel's early guests also included poet Maya Angelou and actress Helen Hayes.

During the 1950s, Frederick Loewe and Alan Jay Lerner composed the score of their musical My Fair Lady at the hotel, and Pulitzer Prize for Drama–winning playwrights Mary Chase, William Inge, and Arthur Miller also stayed at the Algonquin. The actors Audrey Hepburn, Elia Kazan, and Vivien Leigh received theatrical awards in the lobby in 1952. At least two notables have died while staying at the hotel: filmmaker Preston Sturges in 1959 and playwright James Thurber in 1961.

The New York Herald Tribune wrote in 1962 that the hotel still had many notable guests, including Dana Andrews, Leslie Caron, Charles Chaplin Jr., Barnaby Conrad, Noël Coward, William Faulkner, John Gielgud, Tyrone Guthrie, John Hersey, Eugène Ionesco, Elsa Lanchester, Jack Paar, Christopher Plummer, Jules Romains, and Yuri Zavadsky. By then, the hotel also catered to a "new generation of writers", such as John Cheever, Norman Mailer, William Saroyan, and Tennessee Williams; English actors, such as Laurence Olivier, Joan Plowright, and Tony Richardson; and European filmmakers, such as Costa-Gavras, Jean-Luc Godard, Louis Malle, Éric Rohmer, and François Truffaut. Other frequent guests in the late 20th century included Harold Ross, Simone Signoret, and Yves Montand. Fashion designers, such as Mary Quant and Gerald McCann, also constituted an increasing share of the Algonquin's clientele during the 1960s. By the beginning of the 21st century, the hotel's guests included theatrical personalities such as Brenda Fricker, Simon Gray, Peter Hall, Richard Harris, Anthony Hopkins, Jeremy Irons, Angela Lansbury, John Osborne, Jonathan Pryce, Stephen Rea, Diana Rigg, Tom Stoppard, and Peter Ustinov.

=== Algonquin Round Table ===
The Algonquin Round Table met at the hotel's Rose Room, "a place where a lot of slang, phrases and attitudes were shaped". The group originated from a practical joke by theatrical press agent John Peter Toohey, who in June 1919 organized a luncheon to poke fun at drama critic Alexander Woollcott. Initially known as the Luigi Board, after a waiter at the hotel, the group later evolved into a group of journalists, authors, publicists, and actors who gathered over lunch in the main dining room. The Round Table's members referred to themselves as the Vicious Circle and met almost daily for nearly ten years. Its core members included Dorothy Parker, Franklin P. Adams, Robert Benchley, George S. Kaufman and Harpo Marx, as well as Woollcott and Edna Ferber. Playwright George Bernard Shaw, actress Fanny Brice, and composer Irving Berlin were among the many people who vied for invitations to eat lunch with the club.

Frank Case sent plates of "olives, popovers and celery sticks" to the Round Table's members so they would not starve. Case's daughter Margaret wrote: "First, the people who sat at the Round Table were interesting people whose doings and sayings caught and held public attention; and secondly, they were as brave, mentally, as any dashing medieval cavalier was physically brave." The Round Table had a reputation for being witty, although the extent of the group's wit may have been exaggerated. Two members of the club, Harold Ross and Jane Grant, founded The New Yorker magazine. In celebration of this, modern hotel guests receive free copies of The New Yorker.

The group sat at a 15-seat round table, but it is unknown where the original round table was relocated after the Round Table club was disbanded. By the late 1990s, all the tables in the Rose Room were square. The Rose Room was demolished in 1998 to make way for an expansion of the lobby. During that project, the hotel's then-owner Camberley Hotel Group added a circular table in the lobby, a homage to the former luncheon group. Hotel guests could reserve the round table; the other tables in the lobby could be used without reservation. The rebuilt round table was relocated to an alcove adjacent to the Blue Bar in 2022.

== Reception and impact ==
When the Algonquin opened in 1902, the New-York Tribune—which, according to John Tauranac, seldom described things in hyperbolic terms—called the hotel the "last step in excellence in this class of structure". By the late 20th century, the Algonquin had become known as a literary landmark, in part because of its association with the Algonquin Round Table. The New York Times wrote in 2021: "A list of New York literary hotspots would not be complete without the Algonquin, which played host in the 1920s to an assortment of New York writers, playwrights, journalists and actors." Frank Case had written three books about the hotel during his lifetime, and his daughter, Margaret Case Harriman, wrote a memoir about the hotel in 1956. By the hotel's 75th anniversary in 1977, it had been the subject of seven books. The hotel also received Playbill magazine's first George Selvin Award in 1977.

=== Critical reception ===
Arthur Kaptainis wrote for the Montreal Gazette in 1993: "For my money (or lack thereof) the lobby is always the best place to be." A critic for the Pittsburgh Post-Gazette expressed a similar sentiment in 2000, saying that the lobby was "still regarded as the place to see and be seen", even though room rates were more expensive than at the neighboring Iroquois. Reviewers also described the relatively tranquil nature of the Algonquin compared to newer and larger hostelries. In 1990, Jerry Hulse wrote for the Los Angeles Times: "In a city dwarfed by glass and chrome, the Algonquin remains an anachronism, a landmark of social well-being." Similarly, a reporter from the Milwaukee Journal Sentinel wrote in 1997: "In a city of wrecking balls and cranes, plate glass and cold chrome, incessant sirens and frenetic foot traffic, the Algonquin remains an island of civility." The Village Voice described the Algonquin as one of several monuments to "New York aristocracy" on 44th Street, along with the headquarters of the New York Bar Association, Harvard Club, and Penn Club.

Some critics also wrote about the quality of the hotel itself. Rosalie Earle of the Sunday Gazette-Mail wrote in 2010: "The one-bedroom has a king bed and the living room has a pull-out couch, which makes for comfortable and affordable accommodations, when the tab is divided three ways". Following the 2012 renovation, a New York Times critic wrote that the hotel's "dowdy charm" had been removed and that "the Algonquin now feels a bit chilly and corporate". A writer for the Palm Beach Daily News said in 2013 that the units had been enlarged into "sleek, sophisticated guest rooms and suites". By contrast, a writer for Red Online magazine said the Algonquin "now enjoys a wood-columned, now almost neo-Edwardian finish—incongruous with its central Midtown location, in the heart of theatre land". The BBC wrote in 2023 that, while the previous year's renovation of the lobby and Blue Bar "may not be to all purists' tastes", the hotel still retained some Roaring Twenties design details like caricatures on the walls.

=== Landmark status ===
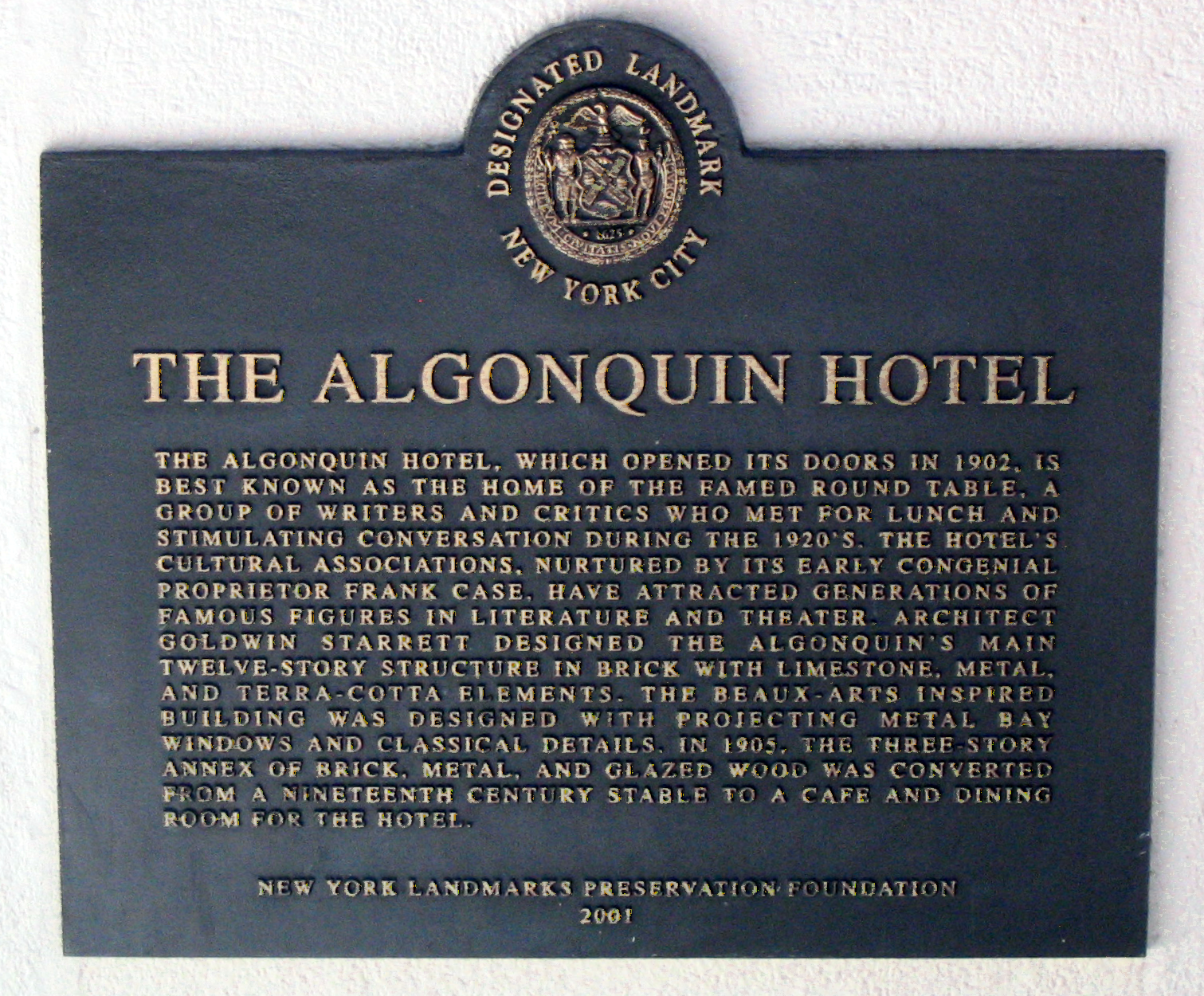
New York City Designated Landmark plaque at the Algonquin Hotel

The Landmarks Preservation Commission considered designating the Algonquin Hotel as an official city landmark in 1985. Unlike other city landmarks, the hotel was known more for its historical associations than for its architecture. The LPC designated the Algonquin Hotel as a city landmark in September 1987. Although the hotel's longtime owner Ben Bodne had opposed the designation, its new owner Aoki Corporation supported the city-landmark status. In designating the hotel as a landmark, the LPC cited the impact of the Algonquin Round Table and the number of other literary and theatrical figures who lodged there.

In 1996, the hotel was designated a National Literary Landmark by Friends of Libraries, and its bronze plaque is attached to the front of the hotel. The hotel's facade contains another plaque, dedicated in 1963, which commemorates a horse stable that previously occupied the site, and had belonged to either Jay Gould or W. H. Aiken. The building is counted among Historic Hotels of America, a program of the National Trust for Historic Preservation.

== See also ==
- List of New York City Designated Landmarks in Manhattan from 14th to 59th Streets
- List of hotels in New York City
