= What Is Love (disambiguation) =

"What Is Love" is a song by Haddaway.

What Is Love may also refer to:

== Film and television ==
- What Is Love? (2013 film), or Nishwartha Bhalobasa, a Bangladeshi film directed by Ananta Jalil
- What Is Love? (2018 film), or Just Only Love, a 2018 Japanese film directed by Rikiya Imaizumi
- What Is Love (TV series), a 2012 Taiwanese romantic comedy series
- What Is Love?, the finale of the third season of You

== Literature ==
- What Is Love? (picture book), a 2021 book written by Mac Barnett and illustrated by Carson Ellis
- What Is Love?, a 1928 novel by E. M. Delafield

== Music ==
=== Albums ===
- What Is Love? (Andrea Marcovicci album) or the title song, 1992
- What Is Love? (Clean Bandit album), 2018
- What Is Love? (Never Shout Never album) or the title song, 2010
- What Is Love? (EP), by Twice, or the title song (see below), 2018

=== Songs ===
- "What Is Love" (En Vogue song), 1993
- "What Is Love?" (Howard Jones song), 1983
- "What Is Love?" (Twice song), 2018
- "What Is Love" (V. Bozeman song), 2015
- "(What Is) Love?", by Jennifer Lopez from Love?, 2011
- "What Is Love?", by Debbie Harry from Necessary Evil, 2007
- "What Is Love", by Exo from Mama, 2012
- "What Is Love?", by Frances from Fifty Shades Darker: Original Motion Picture Soundtrack, 2017
- "What Is Love", by Janelle Monáe from the Rio 2 film soundtrack, 2014
- "What Is Love?", by Lee Hi from 4 Only, 2021
- "What Is Love", by Miriam Makeba from Pata Pata, 1968
- What is Love?, by Raven-Symoné from This Is My Time, 2004
- "What Is Love?", by the Playmates, 1959
- "What Is Love", by Take That from The Circus, 2008
- "What Is Love?", written by Irving Berlin

== See also ==
- What's Love (disambiguation)
- Baby Don't Hurt Me
