= Frank Case =

American hotelier and author

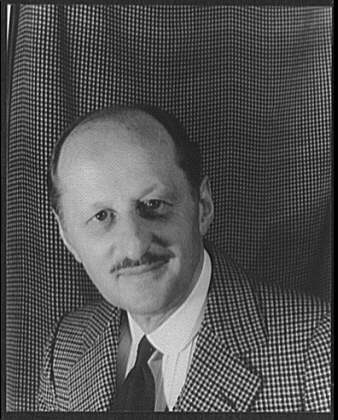
- Portrait of Frank Case in 1933
- Born: November 7, 1872
- Died: June 7, 1946 (age 73)
- Occupation: Hotelier
- Known for: Owning and managing the Algonquin Hotel

Frank Case (November 7, 1872 – June 7, 1946) was an American hotelier and author. He owned and managed the Algonquin Hotel during the heyday of the Algonquin Round Table and wrote a number of books about his experiences with the hotel and the Round Tablers.

Case worked at the Algonquin from the time it opened in 1902. It was Case who came up with the hotel's name. The original owner had wanted to call it "The Puritan." In 1907 Case took over the lease and became manager, eventually buying the hotel in 1927 for $1,000,000. He remained owner and manager of the Algonquin until his death in 1946.

== Personal life ==
Born in Buffalo, New York, on November 7, 1872, Frank Case worked as an usher at a vaudeville theater as a teen. In 1896, he started his hotel career as a night clerk at the Genesee Hotel in Buffalo. In a live appearance on the Royal Gelatine Hour radio show on June 17, 1937, Case told Rudy Valee that he learned his hotelier skills at the Genesee Hotel. There, he had to stay up all night by roaming the hotel on roller skates. Later, he managed Taylor's Hotel in Jersey City, New Jersey for three years. In 1902, at age 31, he was hired by Albert Foster to work at the new hotel at 59 W. 44th Street in Manhattan. Although Foster owned the hotel, Case embraced it as his own. He persuaded his boss to change the name of the hotel, from the "Puritan" to the "Algonquin." Twenty-five years later, he bought the business.

In June 1916, Mr. Case married Mrs Bertha Louise Grahling, née Walden. His best man was Douglas Fairbanks Sr, a lifelong friend. Bertha was a charming, gracious, outstanding hostess, who fully participated in hotel operations. The Algonquin became a hub for both theater people and journalists, whose offices were nearby. In 1918, Vanity Fair magazine was four doors down. VF writers Robert E. Sherwood, Robert Benchley, and Dorothy Parker began lunching at the Algonquin. When the press reported that theater critic, Alexander Woollcott, was roasted at the Algonquin, customers increased. Mr. Case had a passion for the Arts, and encouraged, cultivated, and catered to the growing literary and artistic celebrities. Those attending these luncheons included Heywood Broun, Harold Ross, Edna Ferber, George S. Kaufman, Harpo Marx, and Franklin P. Adams (F.P.A.) among many others. Mr. Case moved this lively group to a round table in the center of the Rose room. Thus, began the Algonquin Round Table. He served them free hors d'oeuvres, provided a room for poker games, and space for journalists to hammer out stories. In 1925, Round tabler Harold Ross founded the New Yorker magazine. Case began the tradition of giving each hotel guest a free copy of The New Yorker. Frank Case died June 7, 1946, in Manhattan, New York, and is buried in New York City's Woodlawn Cemetery.

Case was married twice. His first wife, Caroline Eckert Case, died in 1908 giving birth to the couple's second child, a boy named Carroll. Nine years following Caroline's death, Case married a woman he referred to as "Hebe" in his books. Case's elder child was the author Margaret Case Harriman, who was Oliver Harriman Jr. son's, John Harriman, third wife (her second marriage). Margaret, who wrote among other books, wrote a memoir of the Algonquin Round Table entitled The Vicious Circle. His son Carroll married actress Josephine Dunn, with whom he would remain until his death in 1978.

== Bibliography ==
- Tales of a Wayward Inn – a memoir published in 1938. Includes a chapter on the Round Table.
- Do Not Disturb – a second memoir published in 1940.
- Feeding the Lions – a 1942 cookbook that included comments from famed Algonquinites on their favorite dishes. In 2005 the hotel integrated updated versions of recipes from the book into the menu.
