= The Canterville Ghost (1986 film) =

- Genre: Comedy; Fantasy; Horror
- Based on: "The Canterville Ghost"; 1887 short story by Oscar Wilde
- Written by: George Zateslo
- Directed by: Paul Bogart
- Starring: John Gielgud; Ted Wass; Andrea Marcovicci; Alyssa Milano
- Music by: Howard Blake
- Countries of origin: United Kingdom; United States
- Original language: English

Production
- Executive producers: Irwin Meyer; Rodney Sheldon
- Producer: Peter Graham Scott
- Cinematography: Bob Edwards
- Editor: Terry Maisey
- Running time: 96 minutes
- Production companies: Pound Ridge Productions; Inter-Hemisphere Productions; Harlech Television (HTV); Columbia Pictures Television

Original release
- Network: Syndication
- Release: October 15, 1986

The Canterville Ghost is a 1986 made-for-television syndicated comedy fantasy horror film based on the 1887 short story "The Canterville Ghost" by Oscar Wilde, directed by Paul Bogart. It was shot at Eastnor Castle in England and stars John Gielgud, Ted Wass, Andrea Marcovicci and Alyssa Milano.

== Plot ==
Harry Canterville (Wass), who has spent most of his life in Cleveland, Ohio, returns with his new wife Lucy (Marcovicci) and his daughter from a previous marriage, Jennifer (Milano), to take up his inheritance of Canterville Castle in a small village in England. They find that the castle is haunted by the ghost of a disgraced ancestor, Sir Simon de Canterville (Gielgud). Despite the eccentric relatives who will not enter the castle and the gloomy predictions of Mr. and Mrs. Umney, Harry and Lucy do not believe that there actually is a ghost. They think that they are merely being hoaxed through wires. Harry is determined to stay for at least three months, after which he can take full possession. He also decides to then sell the castle to a property developer, who wants to turn the castle into a hotel.

Meanwhile, Jennifer sets out to the attic at night in search of the ghost. Her biological mother died four years earlier, and she has never learned to accept Lucy as her stepmother despite Lucy's attempts to befriend her. She contacts Sir Simon, who initially tries to scare her off, like he is used to do. Jennifer ignores her fear and asks Sir Simon if he will try to scare off Lucy. Sir Simon, surprised by Jennifer, befriends her for being the first person not to be scared by him. He tells her that he has not slept in over 300 years and is extremely tired. The next morning, Harry climbs on the roof of the castle in search of wires, and when he falls off, he is rescued by Sir Simon. Sir Simon simultaneously tries to grant Jennifer's wish: Lucy complains about seeing scary figures in the mirror, and sometimes feeling icy cold fingers on her shoulder when she is alone in a room, as well as hearing voices. Harry and Lucy finally start to believe that the ghost is real when Sir Simon shows up to scare off guests at a dinner party.

Through Paul Blaine (Chandler), one of her classmates, she learns of the rumour that Sir Simon killed his wife Eleanor (in truth she accidentally fell down the stairs trying to strike him). They head out to the graveyard, where it turns out that Sir Simon does not have a date of death on his tombstone. Sir Simon shows up to scare off Paul, and – after a period of Jennifer not wanting to talk to him – explains to her that he is doomed to remain on the estate after the death of his wife, who cursed him for the death of their daughter, which he caused by failing to maintain a bridge. She learns that Sir Simon can escape when she persuades the Angel of Death to release him. Despite the risks, she does so and Sir Simon is released from the curse.

== Cast ==
- John Gielgud as Sir Simon de Canterville
- Ted Wass as Harry Canterville
- Andrea Marcovicci as Lucy Swackhammer Canterville
- Alyssa Milano as Jennifer Canterville
- Harold Innocent as Hummle Umney
- Spencer Chandler as Paul Blaine
- Lila Kaye as Mrs. Umney
- George Baker as Uncle Hesketh
- Dorothea Phillips as Aunt Gretchen
- Bill Wallis as Fenton Cook

== Production ==
Gielgud told an interviewer that he left his retirement to take the role, because it "[took] his mind off advancing age". Milano, in one of her first TV movies, said in a later interview that Gielgud helped her overcome her struggles with dyslexia during production.

Some of the filming took place at All Hallows school in Somerset.

== Reception ==
The film did not receive much praise or attention, and Variety magazine noted in its review: "Milano as the catalyzing daughter Jennifer adapts to the ghostly Sir Simon without a qualm; that, of course, is the true charm of the story, but Milano doesn't exhibit enough presence to match the droll, charming Gielgud".

== See also ==
- List of ghost films
