= Hoy Wong =

American bartender (1920–2009)

- Born: Hoy Chee Wong; August 23, 1920; Sha Tau Kok, British Hong Kong
- Died: July 30, 2009 (aged 88); New Jersey, U.S.
- Other names: Mr Hoy (nickname )
- Citizenship: United States
- Occupation(s): bartender, soldier
- Years active: 1948-2009
- Employer: Algonquin Hotel from 1979-2009
- Known for: The oldest barman in New York upon his death

Hoy Chee Wong (August 23, 1920 – July 30, 2009), known affectionally as Mr Hoy, was a Hong Kong-born American bartender and media personality in New York City. He was believed to be the oldest person to hold such a position in New York prior to his death. He served numerous high profile clientele, including film star Anthony Quinn.

== Biography ==
=== Early life, national service and early career ===
Wong was born in Sha Tau Kok, a closed town in British Hong Kong, in August 1920, though Wong claimed to have been born in August 1916. He fled Hong Kong in 1940 during the Japanese invasion of China and ended up in San Francisco, California, where he joined the US Air Force in July 1941 and learned English. Wong was stationed in both China and India during World War II until he was discharged due to war injuries. Wong applied for citizenship August 1943. He established himself in New York City in 1948; where he worked bartending at a Chinese restaurant, serving such celebrities as Dean Martin, Jerry Lewis and Bob Hope. Over the years he has served celebrities such as Marilyn Monroe, who he remarked "...was very nice", and Judy Garland, "...[who] was lovely. She liked to drink. She liked it a lot." He also served Joe DiMaggio, John Lennon, and Henry Kissinger, but stated his most memorable time was in 1961, serving the Duke of Windsor, Edward VIII, a martini.

=== Bartending career ===
Wong started working at the Algonquin Hotel in 1979, one of the oldest bars still operating in the city. He was commemorated for 27 years of work in 2006, which made headlines; some of the over 300 guests at the ceremony were previous customers, including some who were underage at the time. Wong had served them anyway and they came to give him thanks. Wong credits his longevity to healthy living and a relaxed attitude. "It doesn't matter what happens," he said. "Turn around, I can forget it." Wong himself a teetotaller stopped drinking alcohol in 1982, following a heart attack.

=== Later life and death ===
Despite working in New York City, Wong lived in Flushing, Queens, New York, from the mid-1970s and remained there until the 1990s, before moving to Succasunna, New Jersey.

Wong died in New Jersey in July 2009, at the age of 88. He had retired several months prior.
