= Charlotte Sweet =

1982 off-Broadway musical

- The Love of Ludlow Ladd
- Charlotte Sweet Album Cover Art
- Music: Gerald Jay Markoe
- Lyrics: Michael Colby
- Basis: Sequel to Ludlow Ladd (musical by Colby & Markoe)
- Premiere: August 12, 1982: Westside Arts Center/Cheryl Crawford Theatre
- Productions: 1982: Chernuchin Theatre/A.T.A., Off-Off-Broadway; 1982: Cheryl Crawford Theatre, Off-Broadway

Charlotte Sweet is an all-sung, all-rhymed original musical with a libretto by Michael Colby and music by Gerald Jay Markoe.

The musical is a sequel to Ludlow Ladd, a comic Christmas musical that Colby and Markoe created Off-off Broadway for The Lyric Theater of New York in 1979.

== Synopsis ==
Set in Victorian England, Charlotte Sweet spotlights Charlotte, a girl with one of the highest and most beautiful soprano voices in the world. Because of her father's debts, she is forced to leave Ludlow Ladd, her Liverpool sweetheart, and join Barnaby Bugaboo's “Circus of Voices”: a troupe of freak voices including low-voiced Katinka Bugaboo, fast-voiced Harry Host, bubble-voiced Cecily Macintosh, and Skitzy Scofield (with dual personalities and voices).

Becoming the troupe's biggest sensation, Charlotte is mercilessly exploited by Barnaby until she has a vocal breakdown. Thereupon, Barnaby and his wife Katinka addict Charlotte to helium balloons in order to maintain her high notes. Only Ludlow Ladd can rescue her.

== Musical numbers ==
Act I

- "At the Music Hall" — Harry and Ensemble
- "Charlotte Sweet" — Bob, Charlotte, and Ensemble
- "A Daughter of Valentine's Day" — Charlotte and Ensemble
- "Forever" — Ludlow and Charlotte
- "Liverpool Sunset" — Ensemble
- "Layers of Underwear" — Bob, Katinka, Barnaby, and Charlotte
- "Quartet Agonistes" — Katinka, Barnaby, Charlotte, and Bob
- "Forever (Reprise)" — Barnaby and Katinka
- "The Circus of Voices" — Barnaby, Katinka, Skitzy, Cecily, Harry, and Charlotte
- "Keep It Low" — Katinka and Men's Chorus (Harry and Skitzy)
- "Bubbles In Me Bonnet" — Cecily
- "Vegetable Reggie" — Harry
- "My Baby and Me" — Skitzy
- "A-Weaving" — Charlotte
- "Your High Note!" — Charlotte, Barnaby, and Katinka
- "Katinka/The Darkness" — Barnaby

Act II

- "On It Goes" – Bob and Ensemble
- "You See In Me a Bobby" – “Patrick”, Barnaby, and Katinka
- "A Christmas Bûche" – Charlotte, Cecily, Skitzy, and Harry
- "The Letter (Me Charlotte Dear)" – Ludlow
- "Dover" – Skitzy
- "Volley of Indecision" – Skitzy, Harry, and Charlotte
- "Good Things Come" – Cecily
- "It Could Only Happen In the Theatre" – Cecily, Skitzy, “Patrick,” and Harry
- "Lonely Canary" – Charlotte
- "Queenly Comments" – “The Queen,” Barnaby, Katinka, “Patrick,” and Charlotte
- "Surprise! Surprise!" – Ensemble
- "The Reckoning" – Ensemble
- "Farewell to Auld Lang Syne/Finale" – Ensemble

== Production history ==
=== Off-Off Broadway ===
Charlotte Sweet began as an Off-Off-Broadway showcase, playing 20 performances (April 13 - May 1, 1982) at the Chernuchin Theatre/American Theatre of Actors.

=== Off-Broadway ===
Receiving enthusiastic reviews, it was optioned by Power Productions/Stan Raiff, moving Off-Broadway on August 12, 1982 to the Westside Arts Center/Cheryl Crawford Theatre. It played 102 performances and eight previews, closing November 7, 1982.

=== Other productions ===
Charlotte Sweet has enjoyed various regional productions, including at the New American Theater in Rockford, IL, in repertory with Ludlow Ladd.

== Cast and crew ==
With direction by Edward Stone and choreography by Dennis Dennehy, the musical featured Mara Beckerman, Alan Brasington, Merle Louise, Michael McCormick, Polly Pen, Christopher Seppe, Sondra Wheeler, and Nicholas Wyman. Merle Louise and Nicholas Wyman respectively took over for Virginia Seidel and Michael Dantuono, who were in the showcase. Scenery was designed by Holmes Easley, costumes by Michele Reisch, and lighting by Jason Kantrowitz, with musical direction by Jan Rosenberg.

== Recording ==
The original production cast recording was released by John Hammond Records in 1983, reissued by DRG Records, and is now available on Jay Records. The cast album features original cast members as well as Jeff Keller, Lynn Eldredge, and Timothy Landfield (who succeeded Brasington, Wheeler, and Wyman).

== Critical response ==
John Corry of The New York Times wrote that "Charlotte Sweet mixes the adorable and the strange, and it is delectable." The New York Post called it “a heartwarming echo of the music hall in turn-of-the-century England”. It was championed by artist Al Hirschfeld and Leonard Cohen who said he "loved the show".

Charlotte Sweet was nominated for three Drama Desk Awards, including "Outstanding Actress in a Musical", "Outstanding Music", and "Outstanding Lyrics".

== Background ==
The musical was developed via a series of flukes. Juilliard-trained composer Gerald Jay Markoe was seeking a lyricist when he contacted veteran Broadway producer and agent, Charles Abramson, whose name was the first one listed under "Agents" in the Yellow Pages. Abramson recommended Michael Colby.

Colby and Markoe's first collaboration, a musical version of Jean Anouilh's Time Remembered (Léocadia), was given a staged reading, starring Maria Karnilova, at The Lyric Theatre of New York (Off-Off Broadway). Neal Newman, the company's artistic director, asked Colby and Markoe (both Jewish) to write a Christmas show for the company. The result was Ludlow Ladd, an all-sung, all-rhymed musical whose Dickensian plot unfolds through original Christmas carols. In the cast was a soprano recommended by Neal Newman: Mara Beckerman, whose unusually high voice impressed the writers. Colby and Markoe had such fun on that show, they decided to write a sequel spotlighting Mara Beckerman's high voice, and revolving around other holidays: St. Valentine's Day and New Year's Eve. A final Colby/Markoe musical in this trilogy, Happy Haunting, revolves around Halloween.

As Colby and Markoe developed the first musical with Christmas carols, they based Charlotte Sweet around British music-hall turns (on the recommendation of comedian Elizabeth Wolynski, who also happened to be a photographer for Ludlow Ladd). Ultimately, Charlotte Sweet encompassed three forms of theatre most popular in Victorian England: melodrama, Gilbert & Sullivan style operetta, and music hall.

The musical had several other influences. One was Sergei Prokofiev's Peter and the Wolf. The musical's personalities are defined by their vocal types, just as animals were defined by musical instruments in Prokofiev's piece. Colby was also strongly inspired by the all-rhymed musical sequences of lyricists John LaTouche (The Golden Apple), E.Y. Harburg (The Wizard of Oz), and especially Lorenz Hart. Colby was researcher for the biography written by Hart's sister-in-law Dorothy Hart: Thou Swell, Thou Witty: The Life and Lyrics of Lorenz Hart. A final influence was the Fractured Fairy Tales cartoons of Jay Ward.

== Awards and nominations ==
Year	Award ceremony	Category	Nominee	Result
1983	Drama Desk Awards	Outstanding Actress in a Musical	Mara Beckerman	Nominated
1983	Drama Desk Awards	Outstanding Lyrics	Michael Colby	Nominated
1983	Drama Desk Awards	Outstanding Music	Gerald Jay Markoe	Nominated
