= 26th Scripps National Spelling Bee =

Spelling bee held in the United States in 1953

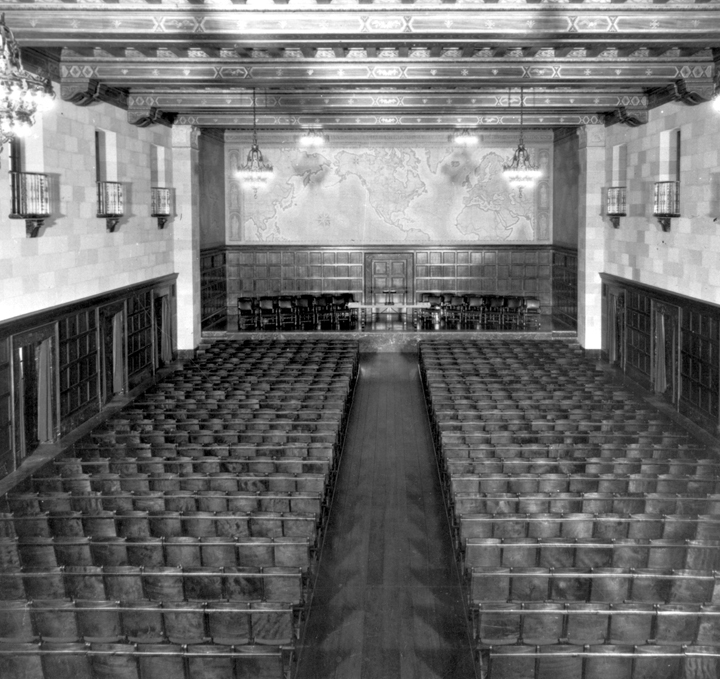
- Department of Commerce auditorium
- Date: May 21, 1953
- Location: Department of Commerce auditorium, Washington, D.C.
- Winner: Elizabeth Hess (13 at time of win)
- Sponsor: Arizona Republic
- Sponsor location: Phoenix, Arizona
- Winning word: soubrette
- No. of contestants: 53
- Pronouncer: Benson S. Alleman

The 26th Scripps National Spelling Bee was held in Washington, District of Columbia on May 21, 1953, sponsored by the E.W. Scripps Company.

The winner was 13-year-old Elizabeth Hess of Arizona, correctly spelling the word soubrette. 11-year-old Raymond A. Sokolov of Detroit, Michigan placed second, falling on "spermaceti", after finishing 22nd the prior year. Third place went to 13-year-old David Hudson of Cuyahoga Falls, Ohio, who had placed sixth the prior year.

1953 saw 53 contestants participate in the contest with 37 girls and 16 boys. Four of which were returning spellers, and the youngest speller was 11 years old. The total words were used was 541. The contest started at 8:45 am and continued until 5:40 pm except for a lunch break and brief recesses.

As of 2025, Hess is the only speller from Arizona to have ever won the Bee.
