= Helen Stuart =

American cabaret and torch singer (1919–2016)

- Born: January 10, 1919
- Died: August 16, 2016 (aged 97); Carmel, New York, U.S.
- Occupation: Singer
- Spouses: Eugene Marcovicci (m. 1945; died 1968) Dana Carroll (m. 1980, died)
- Children: 2; including Andrea Marcovicci

Helen Stuart Marcovicci (January 10, 1919 – August 16, 2016) was an American cabaret and torch singer.

Stuart appeared at New York City venues including the Maisonette Room, the La Vie Parisienne, and the Glass Hat (where Martin and Lewis met) during the heyday of her career in the 1940s. In the later 20th and 21st centuries, she appeared in stage shows with her daughter, cabaret star Andrea Marcovicci, at venues including the Oak Room in New York City.

Stuart came to New York as an au pair from Pennsylvania. A beauty, she was Miss Television at the 1939 New York World's Fair, after which she began appearing as a singer. Stuart married Transylvania-born, Vienna-educated physician Eugen (later Eugene) Marcovicci, who was about 34 years her senior, having been born in 1885. After that she changed her name to Marcovicci and curtailed her singing career. She was the mother of racing-engine firm owner Peter Marcovicci and actress/singer Andrea Marcovicci, who credits her mother with passing down her love of and skill in cabaret. She was widowed in 1968 and remarried Dana Carroll in 1980 who preceded her in death.

== Discography ==
Albums (as Helen Marcovicci)

- I'm Stepping Out With a Dream Tonight
- Seems Like Old Times (2008, CD Baby)

Compilations (as Helen Marcovicci)

- "Look for the Silver Lining" (featuring Andrea Marcovicci) on Just Kern by Andrea Macovicci (1992, Elba)
