= Andrea Marcovicci =

American actress and singer (born 1948)

- Born: Andrea Louisa Marcovicci; November 18, 1948 (age 77); Manhattan, New York City, U.S.
- Occupations: Actress; singer
- Known for: The Front; Love is a Many Splendored Thing; The Concorde... Airport '79
- Spouse: Daniel Reichert (m. 1993–2013)
- Children: 1
- Website: www.andreamarcovicci.com

Andrea Louisa Marcovicci (Romanian: Marcovici) is an American actress and singer.

== Life and career ==
Marcovicci was born in Manhattan to Helen Stuart, a singer, and Eugene Marcovicci, a physician and internist of Romanian descent. In her teens she decided that she wanted to be a singer, but instead majored in drama. In a 1972 interview, she looked back at this period without enthusiasm:

I found that people interested in theater were very serious and heavy. It was a very inbred group. I could not be a part of that. So, if I was going to be an actress, I would have to sing my way into it. I guess what I didn't like about theater on the academic level was the feeling of always being defeated. How could any 18-year-old girl be expected to play Amanda in The Glass Menagerie? You just couldn't be successful at what you were doing. And although I might not have then been able to articulate this, I must have sensed it at the time.

Marcovicci left school and started making her way into show business as a singer, appearing on The Mike Douglas Show and The Merv Griffin Show. As an actress, she debuted in television commercials and played Dr. Betsy Chernak Taylor on the soap opera Love is a Many Splendored Thing from 1970 to 1973. She appeared in the second pilot film for the television series Harry O, titled Smile Jenny, You're Dead. She was nominated for a Golden Globe award for the New Star of the Year in 1977 for the film, The Front (1976). She had a recurring role on Hill Street Blues. She has appeared on Scarecrow and Mrs. King, Kojak, The Incredible Hulk, Magnum, P.I., Cybill, Arli$$, Taxi, Voyagers! (as Cleopatra), Baretta, Mannix, and Friends and Lovers (TV series). She starred on both Trapper John, M.D. and Berrenger's. Marcovicci appeared onstage on Broadway in Ambassador. Her film roles include The Front (1976), The Concorde... Airport '79 (1979), Spacehunter: Adventures in the Forbidden Zone (1983) and Jack the Bear (1993).

In 2008, Marcovicci celebrated her 22nd season at the Oak Room of the Algonquin Hotel with Marcovicci Sings Movies II. A 60th Birthday concert followed in May 2009 at Town Hall in NYC. To commemorate this event her personal record label, Andreasong Recordings, Inc., released a compilation CD titled As Time Goes By: The Best of Andrea Marcovicci, her 17th album and/or CD. At the end of 2011, Marcovicci celebrated her 25th season at the Oak Room with "No Strings", a collection of songs about travel. Her closing performance of "No Strings" was the final cabaret event at the Oak Room, as the Algonquin's new owner turned the space into a lounge for "preferred" customers.

=== Awards ===
She is the recipient of several awards and honors including the Mabel Mercer Foundation's 2007 Mabel Award and three Lifetime Achievement Awards—honored by the Manhattan Association of Cabarets and Clubs, The Licia Albanese-Puccini Foundation, and by a Bob Harrington Backstage Bistro Award. In recognition of her accomplishments in the arts, Andrea has received honorary degrees from Trinity College, Hartford, Connecticut and from the Memphis College of Art. In addition, "The Andrea Marcovicci Suite" at the Algonquin Hotel, dedicated in 2006 on her twentieth anniversary at the Oak Room, contains memorabilia of her work in theatre, film, television, and on the concert stage.

=== Personal life ===
She married actor Daniel Reichert in 1993. The couple separated in 2004 and later divorced. They have a daughter, Alice Wolfe Reichert.

== Partial filmography ==
- Cry Rape (1973) (TV) – Betty Jenner
- Smile Jenny, You're Dead (1974 pilot for Harry O) (TV) – Jennifer English
- Thriller (1975) (TV) – Ruth Harrow
- The Front (1976) – Florence Barrett
- Kojak "Cross Your Heart and Hope to Die" (1974) – Lisa Waldren
- Kojak "Once More from Birdland" (1977) – Francesca Milano
- A Vacation In Hell (1979) – Barbara
- The Concorde... Airport '79 (1979) – Alicia Rogov
- The Hand (1981) – Anne Lansdale
- Taxi “Louie’s Fling”(1981) and “Louie’s Revenge” (1982) (TV) – Emily
- The Incredible Hulk (1981) (TV) – Gail Weber
- Magnum, P.I. (1981) (TV) – Kendall Chase / Amy Crane / Carol Foster
- Hill Street Blues (1981) (TV) – Cynthia Chase ( 4 episodes)
- Kings and Desperate Men (1981) – Terrorist
- Spacehunter: Adventures in the Forbidden Zone (1983) – Chalmers
- The Stuff (1985) – Nicole
- The Canterville Ghost (1986) – Lucy Canterville
- Someone to Love (1987) – Helen Eugene
- The Water Engine (1992) (TV) – Singer in dance hall
- Jack the Bear (1993) – Elizabeth Leary
- Irene in Time (2009) – Helen Dean
- Driving by Braille (2011) – Clare Robles
- Baskets (2019) (TV) – Tammy

== Discography ==
- Marcovicci Sings Movies (1987)
- I'll Be Seeing You: Love Songs of World War II (1991)
- December Songs (1992)
- What Is Love? (1992)
- Just Kern (1992)
- Always Irving Berlin (1995)
- New Words (1996)
- I Am Anne Frank (1996)
- Live from London (1998)
- Some Other Time: Sings Mabel Mercer (1998)
- Here There & Everywhere (2000)
- How's Your Romance? (2004)
- If I Were a Bell (2005)
- My Christmas Song for You (2007)
- Andrea Sings Astaire (2007)
- Andrea Marcovicci Sings Rodgers & Hart (2007)
- Smile (2012)

== Awards and nominations ==
Year	Award	Category	Nominated work	Result
1977	34th Golden Globe Awards	Golden Globe Award for New Star of the Year - Actress	The Front	Nominated
