= Mary Bodne =

- Born: Mary Mazo; October 25, 1906; Odessa, Russian Empire
- Died: February 28, 2000 (aged 93); Manhattan, New York City, United States
- Occupation: Hotelier
- Known for: Co-owner of the Algonquin Hotel in New York City
- Spouse: Ben Bodne (died 1992)
- Children: 2

Mary Bodne (née Mazo; October 25, 1906 – February 28, 2000) was an American hotelier best known as the longtime co-owner and hostess of the Algonquin Hotel in Manhattan.

== Early life ==
Bodne was born Mary Mazo in Odessa, in what is now Ukraine, to Jewish parents who fled pogroms when she was an infant. The family settled in Charleston, South Carolina, where her father, Elihu Mazo, established the city’s first Jewish delicatessen. Musicians George Gershwin and DuBose Heyward were said to be regular patrons while working on Porgy and Bess and were frequent dinner guests at the Mazo home.

== Career and life at the Algonquin ==
Mary married Ben Bodne, an oil distributor from Charleston. During their honeymoon in the 1920s, they had lunch at the Algonquin Hotel and were impressed by the famous guests they saw there such as Will Rogers, Douglas Fairbanks Sr., Sinclair Lewis, Eddie Cantor, Gertrude Lawrence, and Beatrice Lillie. In 1946, they purchased the 200-room hotel for about US$1 million and moved into a suite on the premises.

Bodne became a familiar presence in the lobby, welcoming generations of guests from her armchair. She was known for her hospitality, offering homemade chicken soup to Laurence Olivier when he was ill, babysitting for Simone Signoret, and helping guests secure tickets to sold-out Broadway shows. Writers Brendan Behan and John Henry Faulk also stayed at the Algonquin, as did songwriters Alan Jay Lerner and Frederick Loewe, who worked there on their musical My Fair Lady. Celebrities such as Ella Fitzgerald and Brendan Behan were among her admirers.

== Later life and death ==
Ben Bodne sold the hotel in 1987 to the Aoki Corporation and died in 1992. Mary Bodne continued to live at the Algonquin until her death in Manhattan on February 28, 2000, aged 93. She was survived by two daughters and four sisters.
