= What's Love Got to Do with It? =

What's Love Got to Do with It may refer to:

== Related to Tina Turner ==
- "What's Love Got to Do with It" (song), a 1984 song by Tina Turner
- "What's Love Got to Do with It" (Warren G song), a 1996 song by Warren G and Adina Howard
- What's Love Got to Do with It (1993 film), a 1993 biographical film about Turner
- What's Love Got to Do with It (album), the soundtrack album from the film

== Other uses ==
- What's Love Got to Do with It? (2022 film), a British romantic comedy
- "What's Love Got to Do with It?", an episode of ReBoot
- "What's Love Got to Do with It?", an episode of All Grown Up!
