= Raymond Sokolov =

American journalist (born 1941)

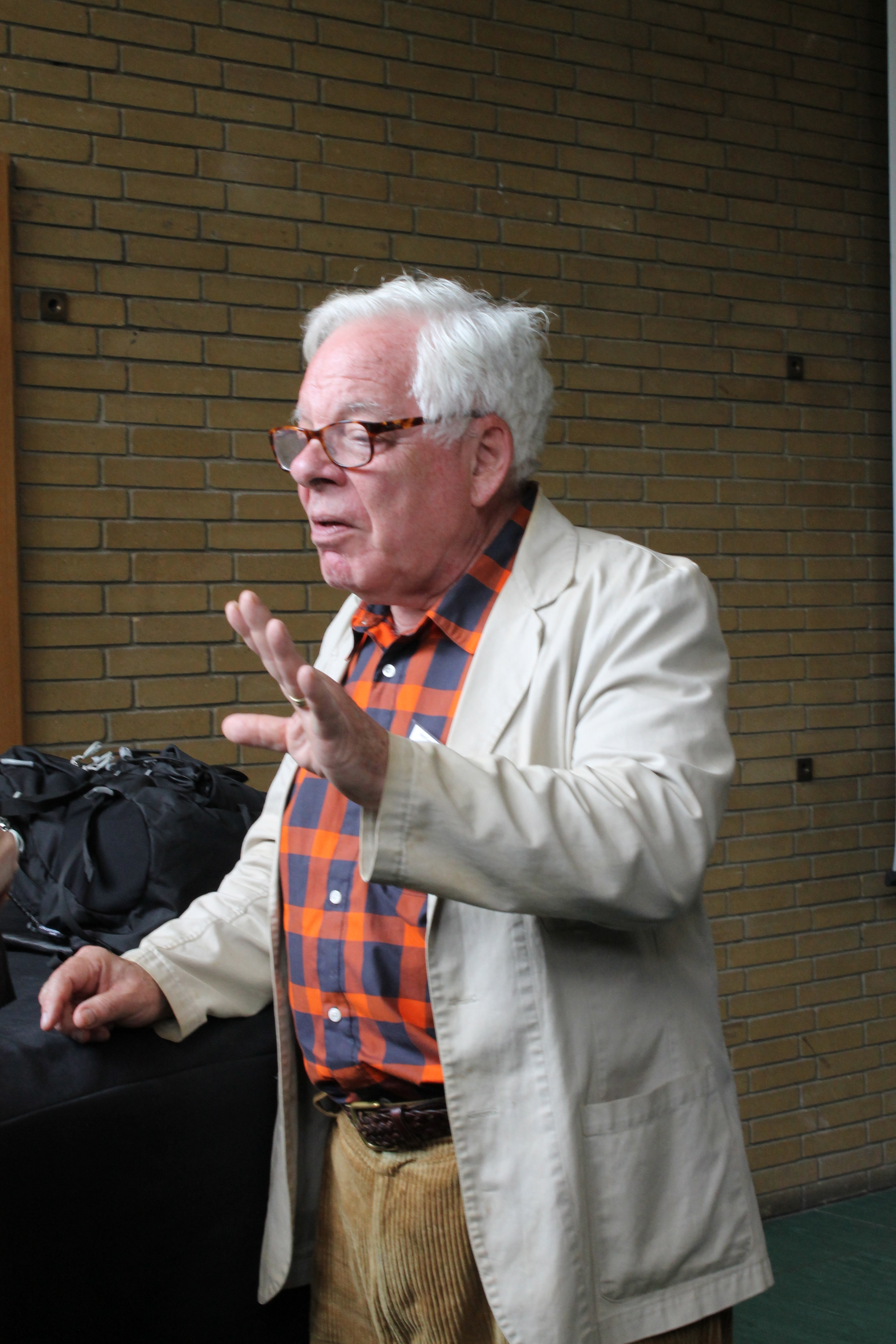
- Raymond Sokolov addressing a plenary session at the Oxford Symposium on Food and Cookery, 2012
- Born: August 1, 1941 (age 85); Detroit, Michigan, U.S.
- Occupation: Food critic

Raymond A. Sokolov (born August 1, 1941) is an American journalist who has written extensively about food. He wrote the "Eating Out" column for The Wall Street Journal's weekend edition from 2006 until March 2010.

== Early life and education ==
Sokolov grew up in Detroit, and, while still in elementary school, finished 26th then 2nd in consecutive years in the National Spelling Bee in 1952 and 1953. He attended secondary school at Cranbrook, in suburban Detroit (Bloomfield Hills), whence he graduated in 1959. After graduating from Harvard College summa cum laude in classics, and spending a year as a Fulbright Scholar at Wadham College, Oxford, Sokolov spent two years back at Harvard pursuing a doctorate in classics. In 1965, he passed his orals.

== Career ==
In 1965, Sokolov began work as foreign correspondent for Newsweek Magazine in its Paris bureau. In summer 1967, he returned to the United States with Newsweek as an arts writer.

In 1971, he became restaurant critic and food editor of the New York Times, where his pieces covered the decor, lore, and politics of New York restaurants as well as the productions of their kitchens. His reviews first noted the arrival of Sichuanese and Hunanese food in North America. He was the first writer in English to notice nouvelle cuisine in France.

In 1975, he left the Times to pursue a career as a freelance writer from his home in Brooklyn Heights. In 1981, he became editor of Book Digest, then the founding editor of The Wall Street Journal's daily Leisure and Arts page, a post he held until 2002. He continues to write about food for national publications.

== Works ==
Sokolov has written several cookbooks, including The Cook's Canon: 101 Classic Recipes Everyone Should Know, which includes recipes from the world's cuisines that Sokolov terms as being necessary to "culinary literacy", as well as brief essays. Other works include The Saucier's Apprentice (1976), a highly-regarded cookbook on the hierarchy of French sauces, Why We Eat What We Eat: How the Encounter between the New World and the Old Changed the Way Everyone on the Planet Eats (1991), and a biography of A. J. Liebling, Wayward Reporter (1980).

His long-running column "A Matter of Taste", on the Americas' foodways for the American Museum of Natural History's Natural History injected some researched facts and logical deduction into the highly fanciful traditional histories of cooking and helped lead to the revival of interest in American regional specialties. Some of the columns have been collected as Fading Feast: A Compendium of Disappearing American Regional Foods (1981).

== Personal ==
In 1980, he married Johanna Hecht, a member of the curatorial staff of the Metropolitan Museum of Art.

He lives in New York City.

== Bibliography ==
- Collected in: American Food Writing: An Anthology with Classic Recipes, ed. Molly O'Neill (Library of America, 2007) ISBN 1-59853-005-4
