= What Is Love? (Andrea Marcovicci album) =

Studio album by Andrea Marcovicci
- Released: 1992
- Genre: Cabaret
- Label: DRG

What is Love? is a 1992 cabaret album by Andrea Marcovicci. It was issued as part of a Cabaret series by DRG Records. Marcovicci is accompanied by Glenn Mehrback at the piano.

== Track listing ==
What Is Love? includes the following tracks.

No.	Title	Length
1.	"What is Love?"	2:02
2.	"Or What Have You"	2:23
3.	"Poem: Dorothy Parker/I Wished on the Moon"	2:39
4.	"Long Ago (And Far away)"	3:27
5.	"Where Have You Been?"	2:12
6.	"Is It Always Like This?"	1:51
7.	"It Amazes Me"	4:51
8.	"Beyond Compare"	2:37
9.	"After You, Who?"	2:14
10.	"Goodbye for Now"	2:02
11.	"The Thrill Is Gone"	4:09
12.	"Poem: Edna St. Vincent Millay/Stay Well"	4:00
13.	"Do You Miss Me"	3:30
14.	"These Foolish Things"	7:01
15.	"Poem: Edna St. Vincent Millay/I Say Hello/There's Always One You Can't Forget/Haunted Heart"	6:51
16.	"Faraway Someone"	4:25
17.	"This Is What I Dreamed"	3:21
18.	"In the End"	2:19
