= Chowk poorana =

Folk art tradition from Northwest India

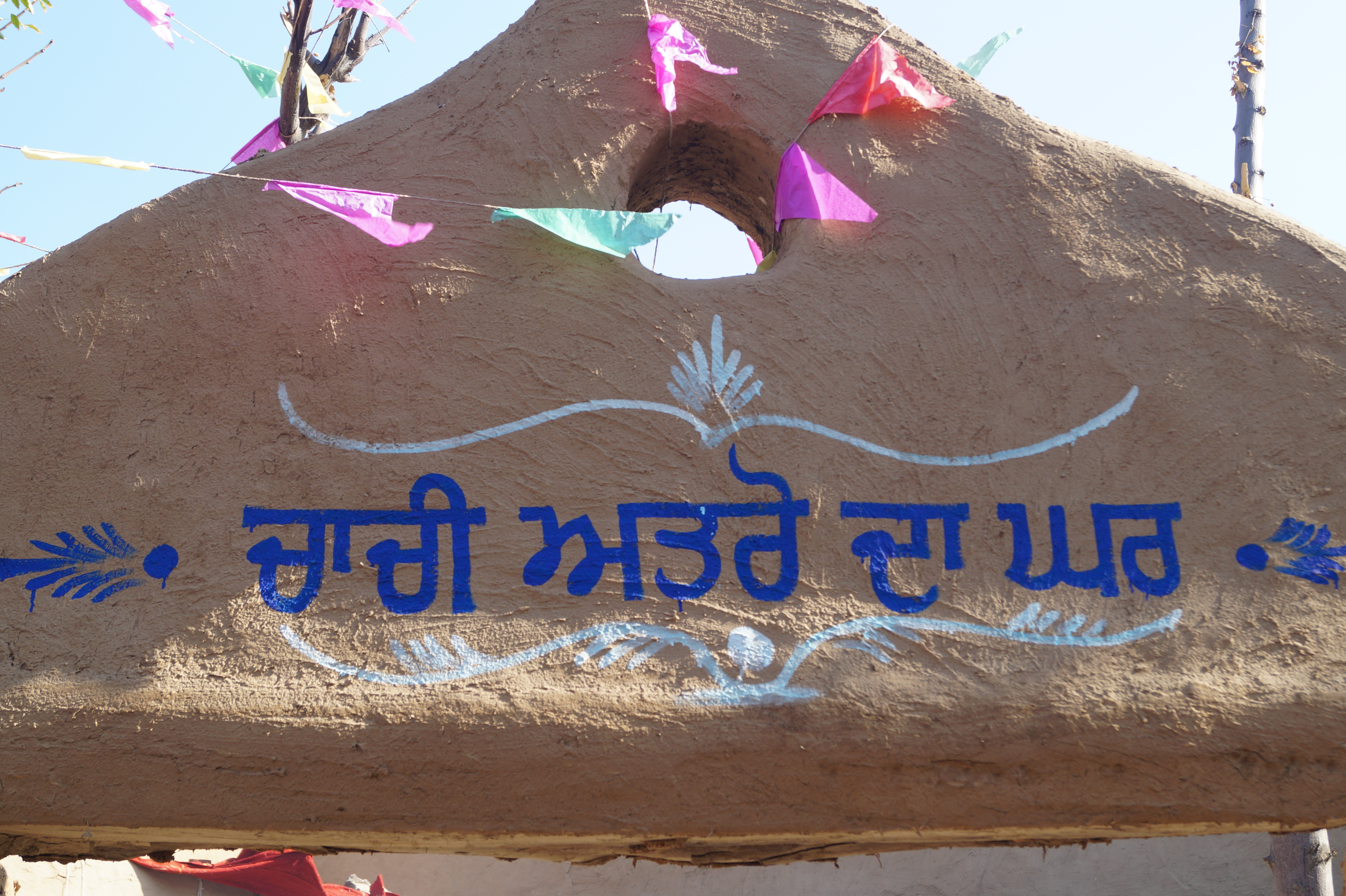
Virasti mela, Bathinda: Mud wall art

Chowk-poorana or Chowkpurana is a folk art practised in Punjab, Haryana, Himachal Pradesh, Madhya Pradesh, Rajasthan and Uttar Pradesh. In Uttar Pradesh, the term chowk-poorana refers to decorating the floor with various designs using flour and rice and also the walls using designs specific to the region.

Similarly, according to Aryan (1983), the term chowk-poorana in Punjab refers to floor art and mud wall painting. This art is primarily practised by women and is a folk tradition. In Punjab, during festivals such as Holi, Karva Chauth and Diwali, walls and courtyards of rural houses are enhanced with drawings and paintings similar to rangoli in South India, mandana in Rajasthan, and rural arts in other parts of India. Chowk-poorana mud wall art in Punjab is given shape by the peasant women of the state. In courtyards, this art is drawn using a piece cloth. The art includes drawing tree motifs, flowers, ferns, creepers, plants, peacocks, palanquins, geometric patterns along with vertical, horizontal and oblique lines. These arts add to the festive atmosphere.

== Etymology and history ==
The term chowk-poorana is made up of two words: Chowk means square and poorana means to fill. The art represents folk mud wall art of the Punjab drawn for decoration or festivals. Hasan (1998) records that during 1849–1949 A.D. decorative designs were painted on mud walls with the occasional bird or animal. Gall et al. (2009) writing in the Worldmark Encyclopedia of Cultures and Daily Life: Asia and Oceania states that the folk art of Punjab may be thousands of years old, noting similarities between village potters clay toys and Harappan figurines. Women paint intricate designs on mud walls on festivals continuing a long tradition.

Similarly, the Haryana Review (1981) states that artists plaster the mud walls with cow-dung which is then whitewashed. Lines are then drawn which create symbolic paintings representing "profit, fortune and prosperity". The Lalit Kala Akademi reported in 1968 on how artists in North India draw paintings noting that some artists "have a special gift for depicting colourful scenes from the epics: some work only in very fine line work in black ink and sindhur (rose-madder)". In the same publication, the prevalence of wall art on the festival of Sanjhi is described. The festival is celebrated annually during Navratri. Women in northern India comprising the area around Delhi, Uttar Pradesh, and the Punjab, plaster the walls and inner courtyards with mud and cowdung. Then geometrical designs are drawn together with circular or triangular clay discs.

== Mud wall painting ==
Kang (1988), in his study of wall art in Punjab, states that the basis of the paintings are to draw circular and triangular shapes which create branches and flowers". According to Dhillon (1998), women create "geometrical figures like trees, birds, open hand, geometrical figures like square, triangles, and circles and sometimes abstract designs, human figures and deities". Aryan (1983) emphasises "that despite its name, the decorative designs are never drawn on the threshold of the house" but on the walls. However, according to Kohli (1983), Punjabi women draw chowkpurna "designs on their thresholds for the well-being and prosperity of their family members as well as to welcome the visitors".

Bhatti (1981) describes the process employed by artists in Punjab in painting on mud walls. The base is mud and cowdung plaster. The artist uses finger-prints and palm marks for decoration. Chalk, yellow and red clay is used for pigments. Traditional and folk-motifs are drawn on the plaster. Black colour is also utilised.

Dhamija (1971) writes that the wall paintings are drawn with white rice paste. Sometimes ochre (clay) and a few colours are also used. The wall paintings display symbolic ritual designs, which are drawn to "celebrate special occasions—festivals such as Diwali or Dussehra; happy family celebrations such as birth of a child". As the art is painted on mud walls, the paintings are drawn twice and perhaps even more times, a year. Sometimes the art can also be seen on brick walls which are plastered with lime. However, the tradition is waning due to cultural changes in the Punjab. Nevertheless, Kang notes in 2018 that in some mud houses, traditional folk art can still be seen on the walls. Similarly, Bedi (1978) notes that during Diwali, women plaster the walls with lime and then draw an image of Lakshmi.

Manku (1986) in his study of Gujjar settlements, states that people in the sub-mountainous region of Punjab people wash the outer and inner walls with white clay called golu. On the inside of the walls, women paint religious motifs with rice powder mixed with water.

=== Gallery ===
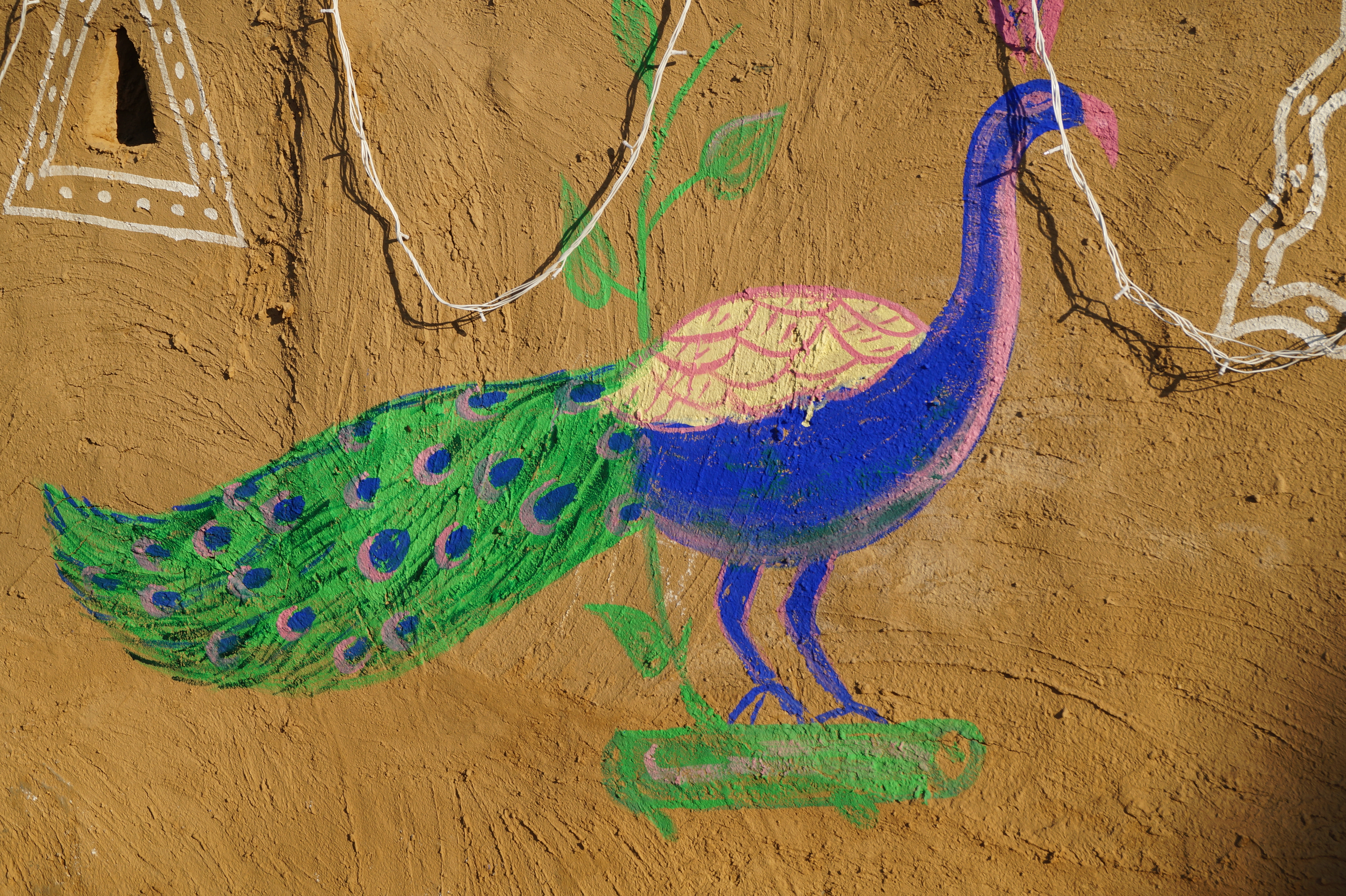
Virasti Mela, Bathinda (Punjabi Heritage Festival) Mud wall art

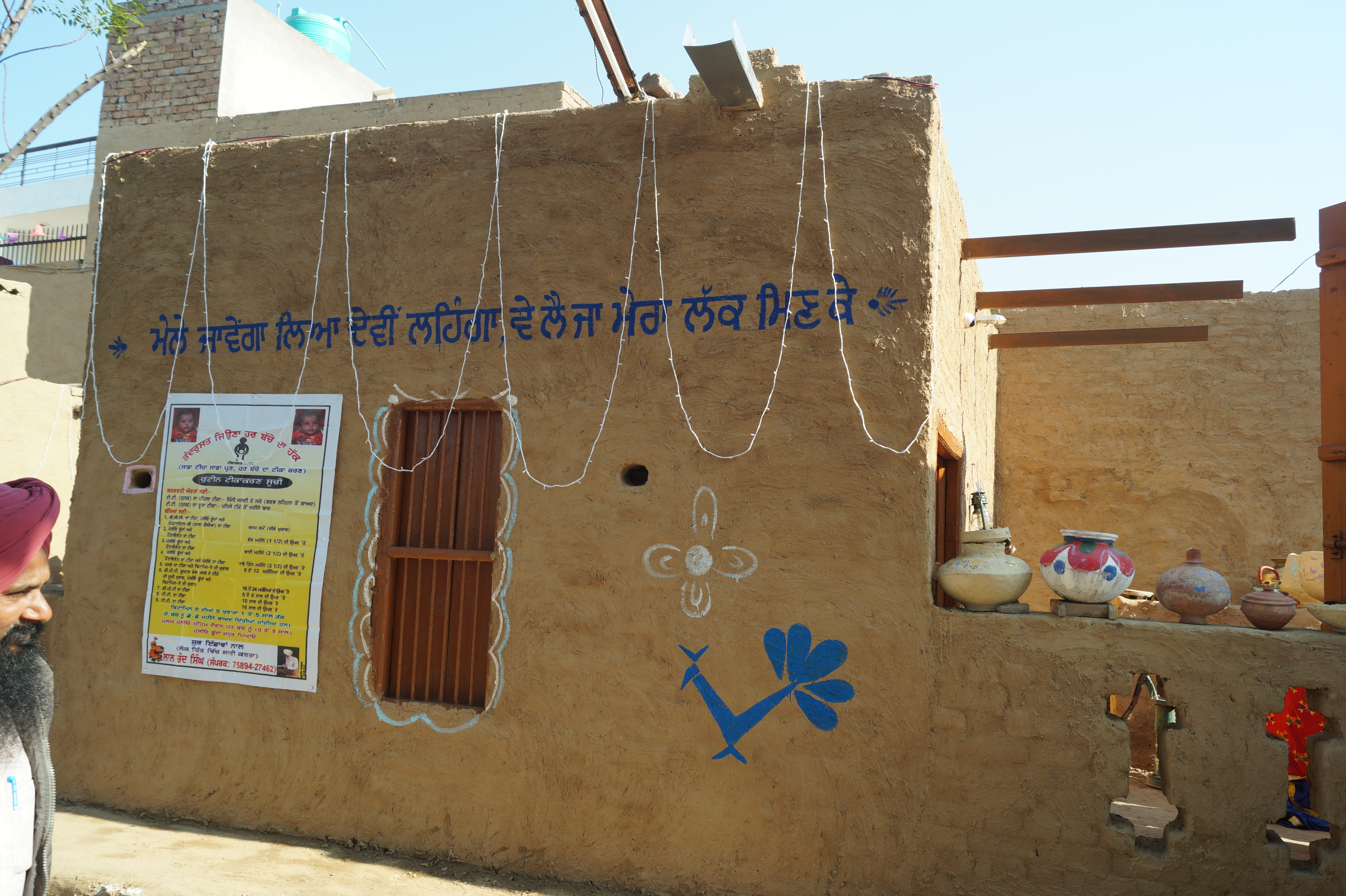
Virasti Mela, Bathinda (Punjabi Heritage Festival) Peacock drawn using geometrical shapes

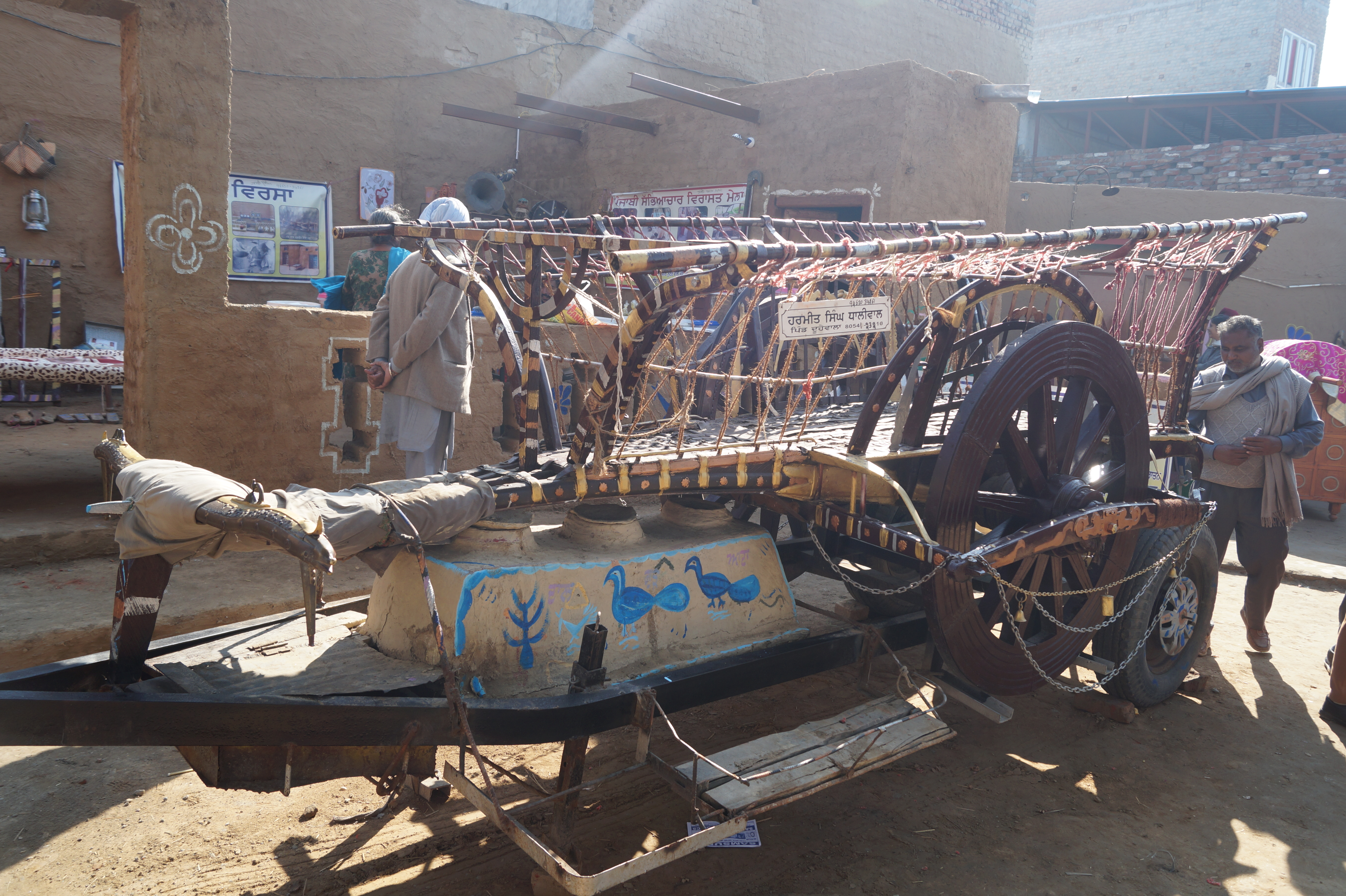
Gadda (cart). Art on the wall and on the cart

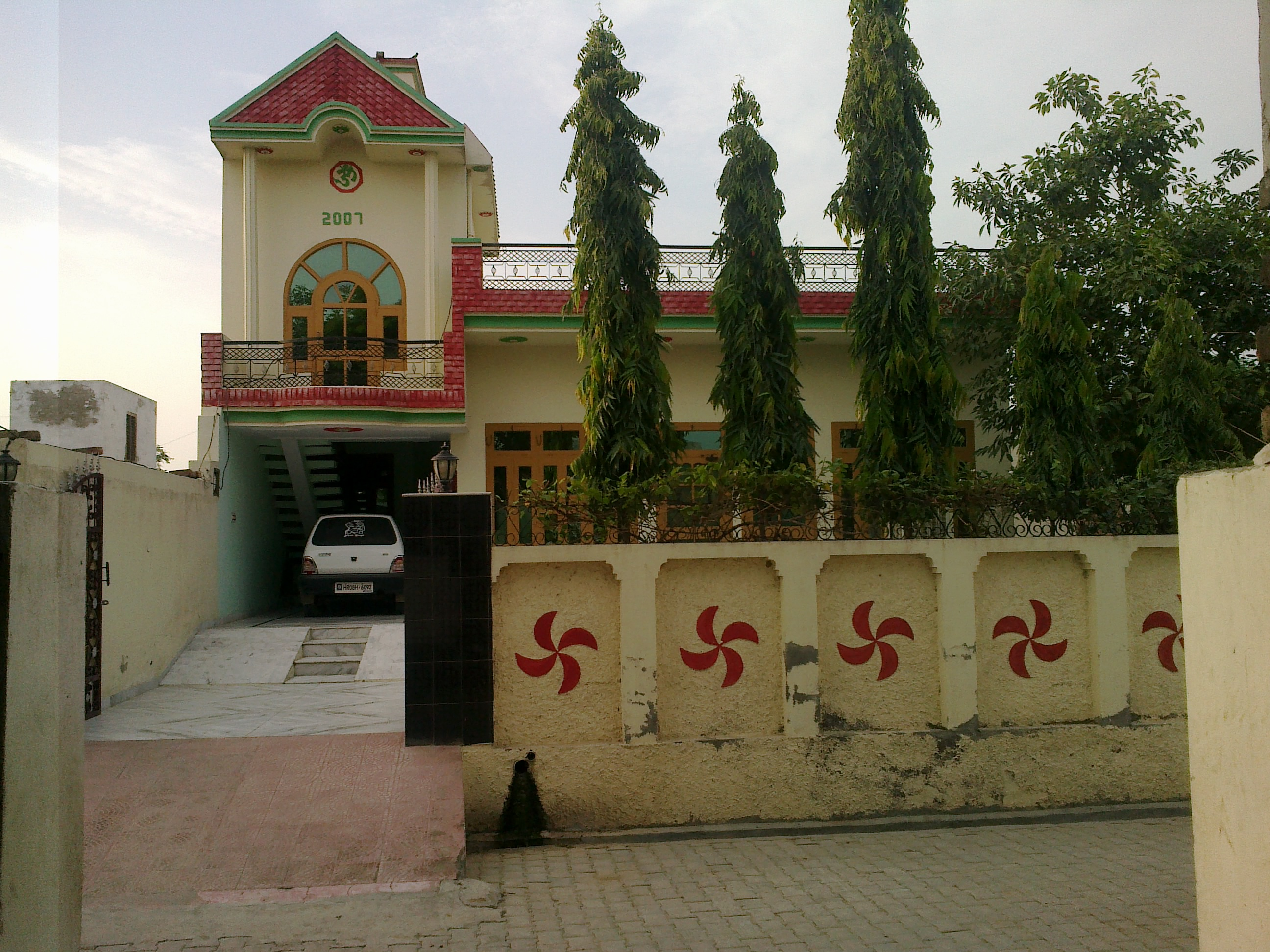
House Budha Khera, Kaithal, Haryana. Wall art using modern paint.

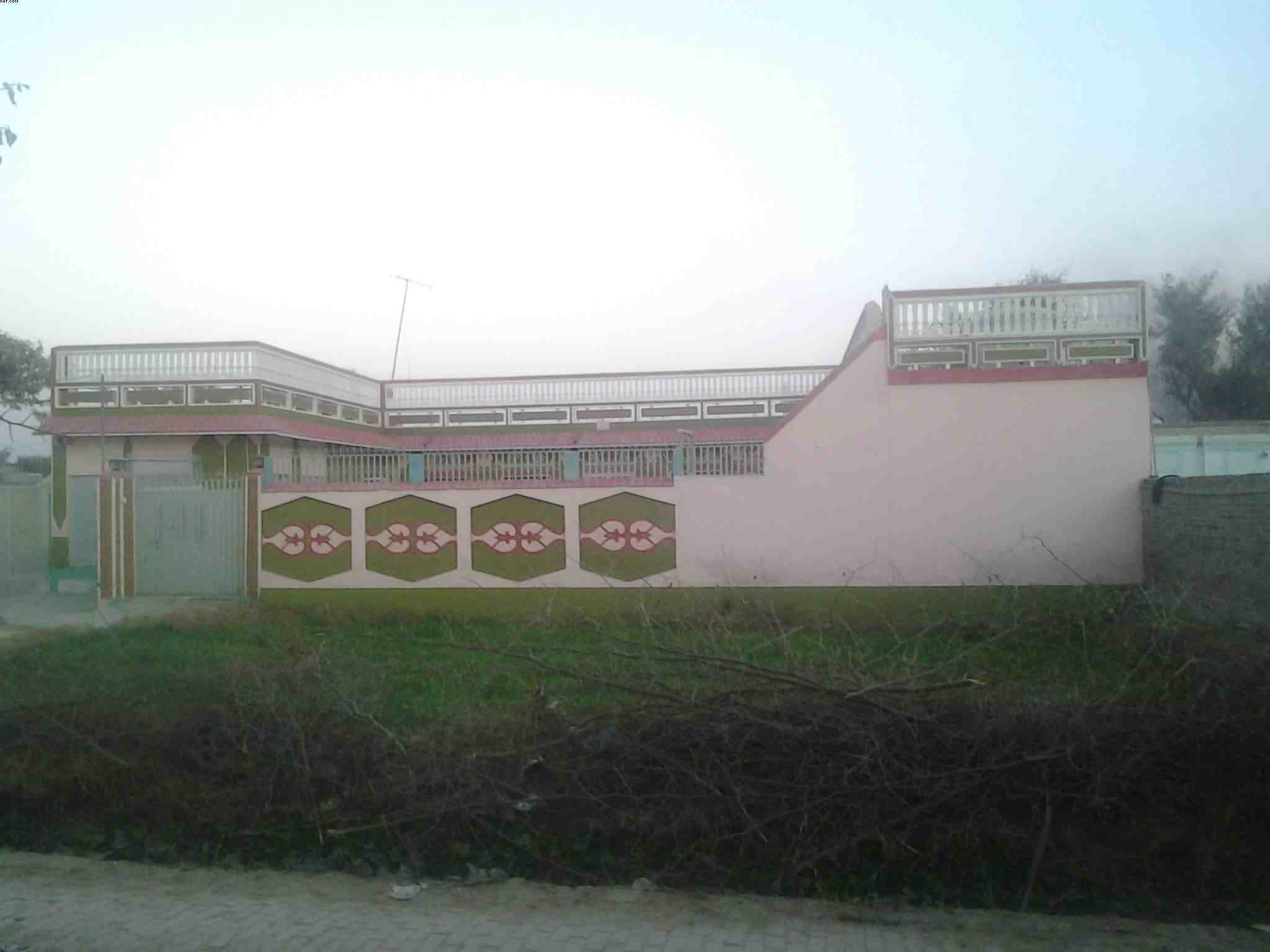
Ghaffar House. Punjab, Pakistan. Motifs is modern paint and plaster.

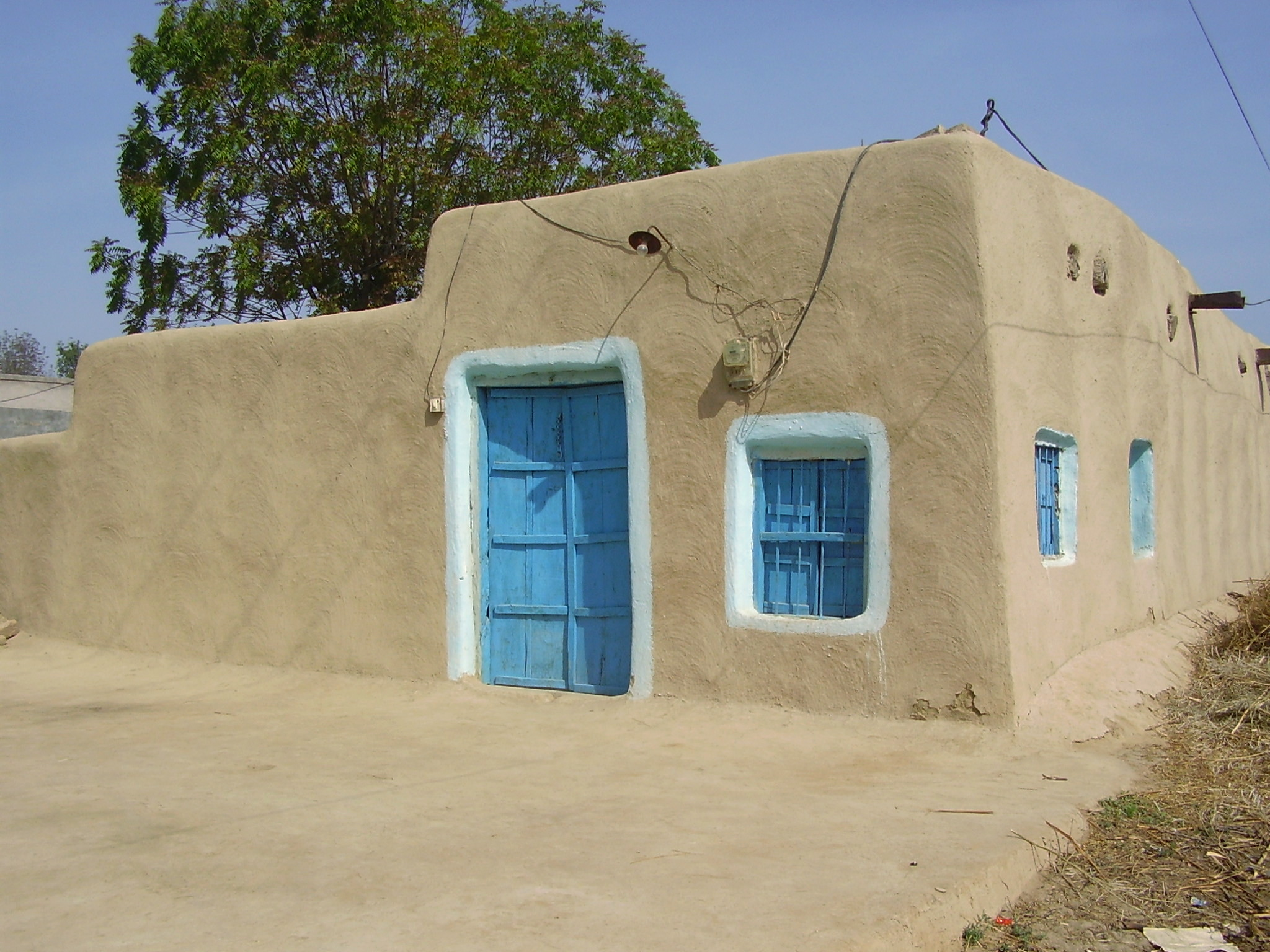
Traditional mud Punjabi home (Pakistan)

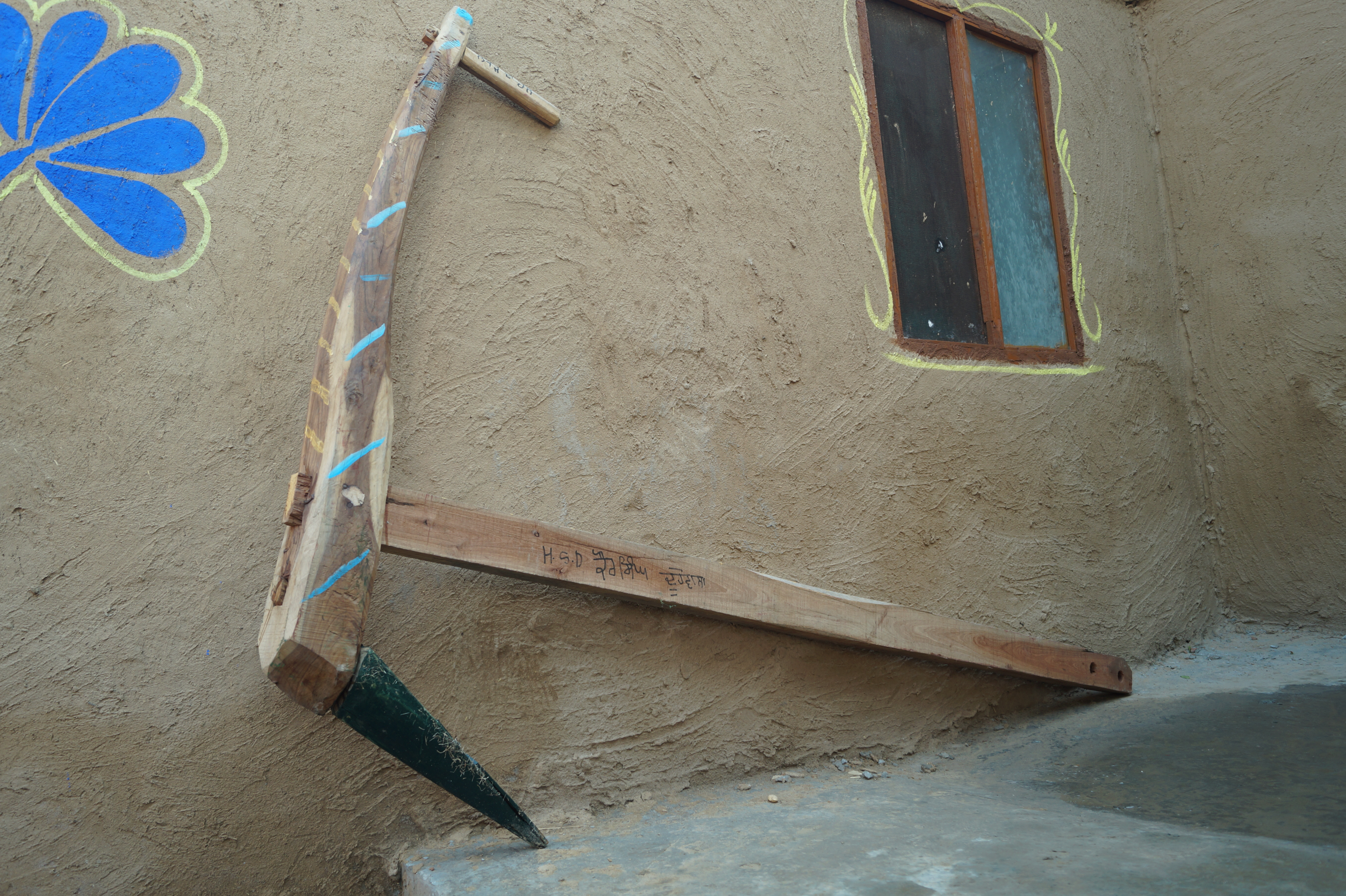
Virasti Mela, Bathinda Mud wall art

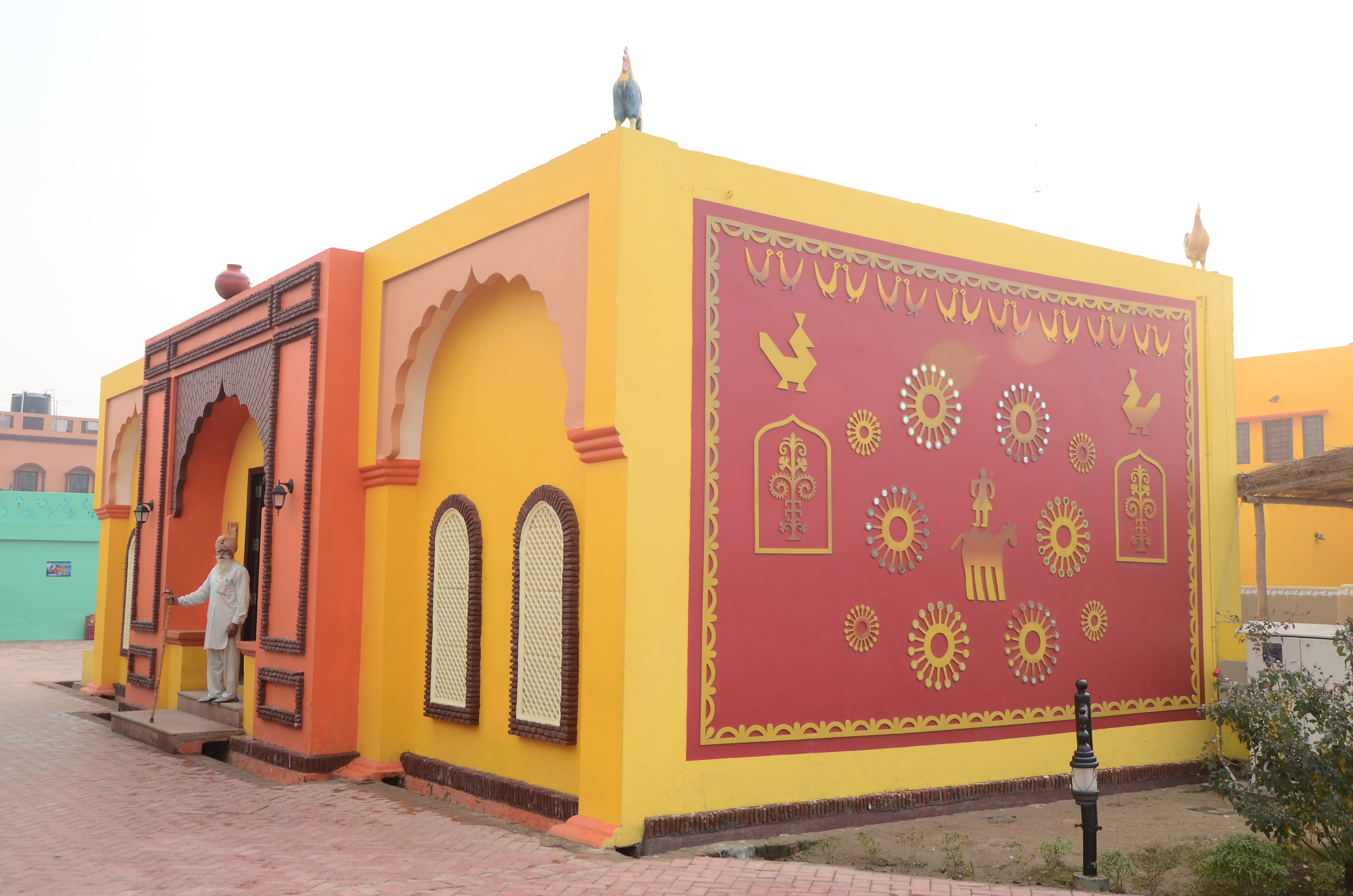
Sadda Pind Amritsar. Wall art

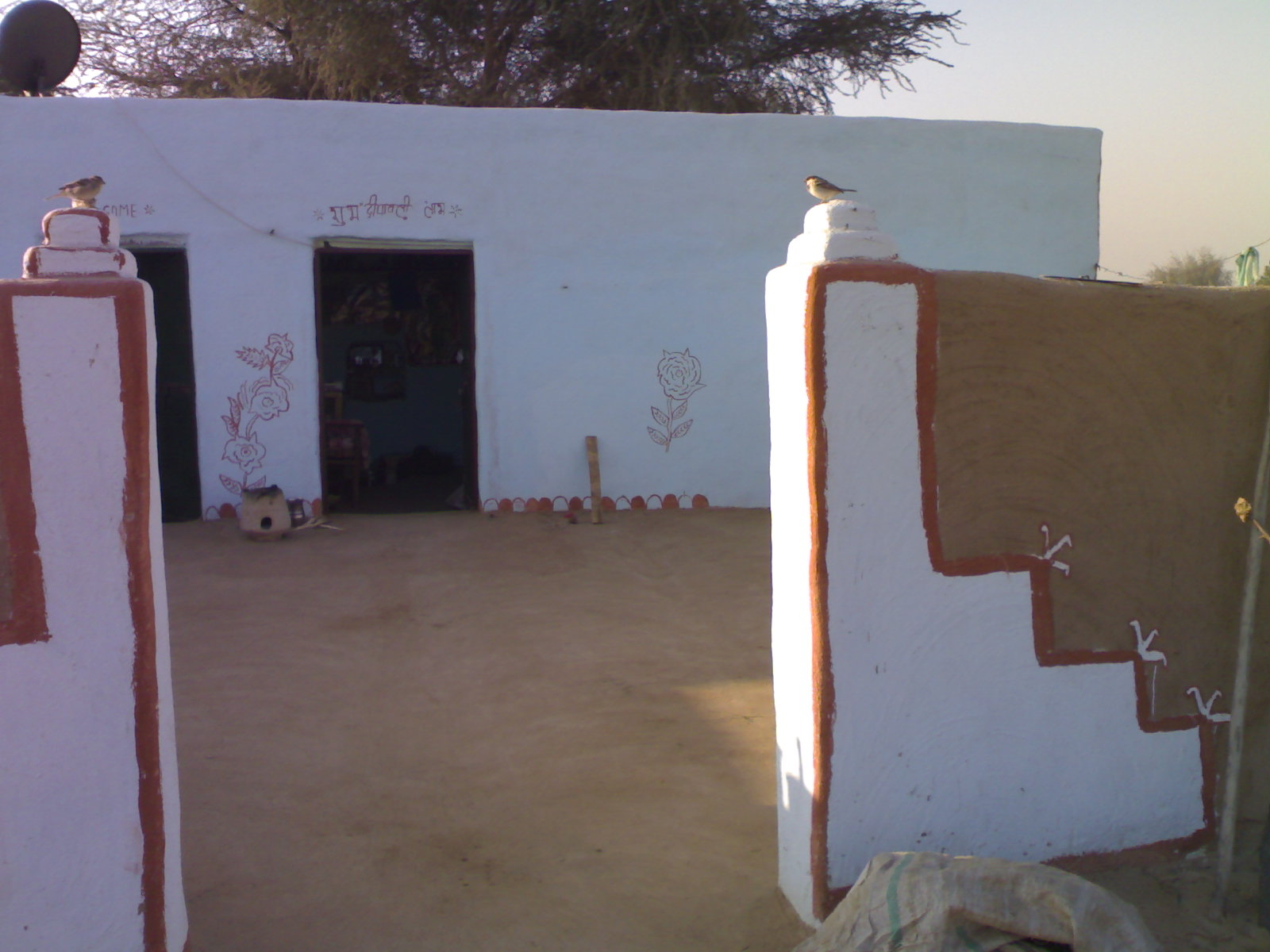
Rural kutcha homes with folk art

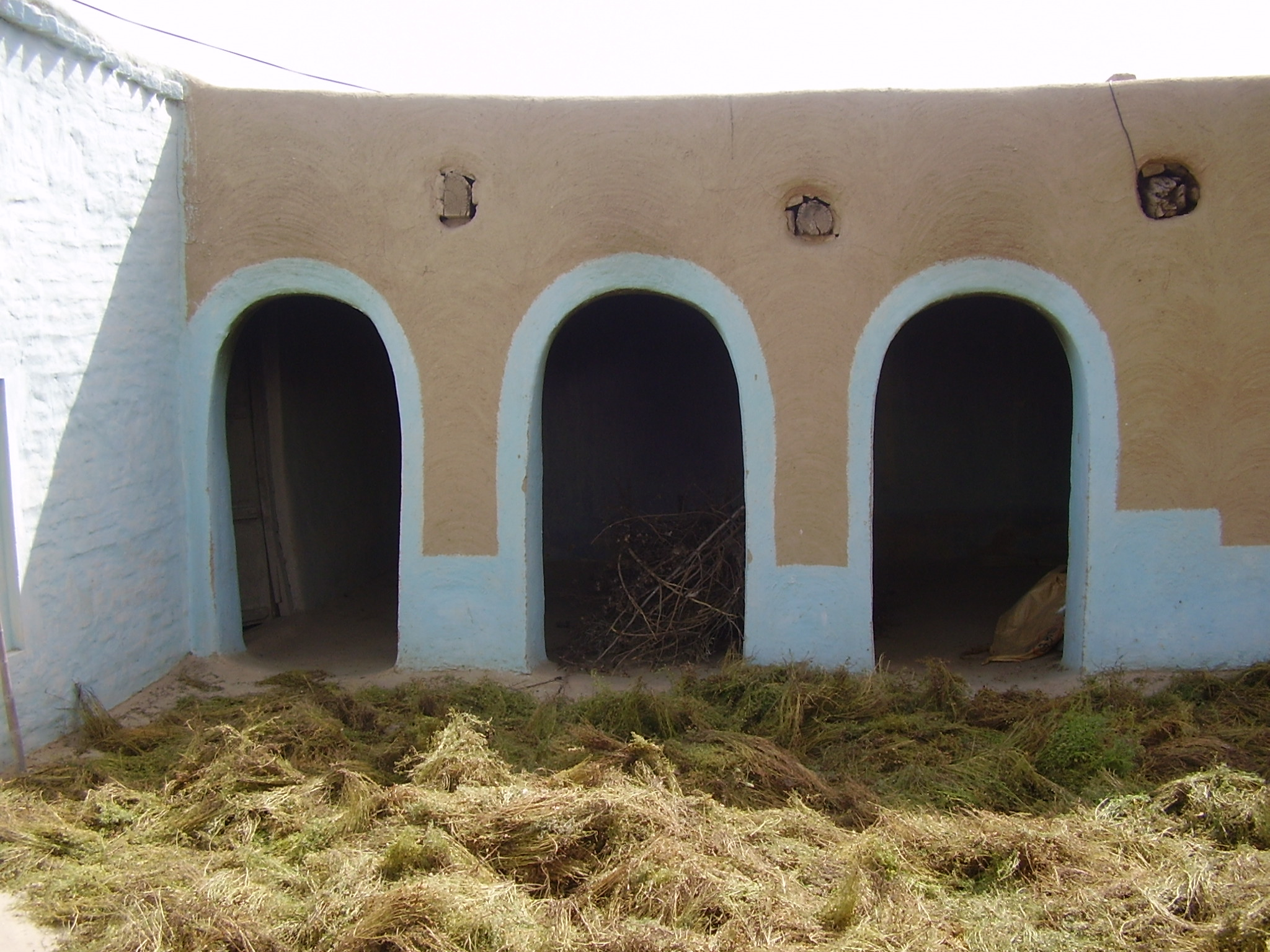
Drying Crop in rural Punjabi home

== Ortta/kandholi ==
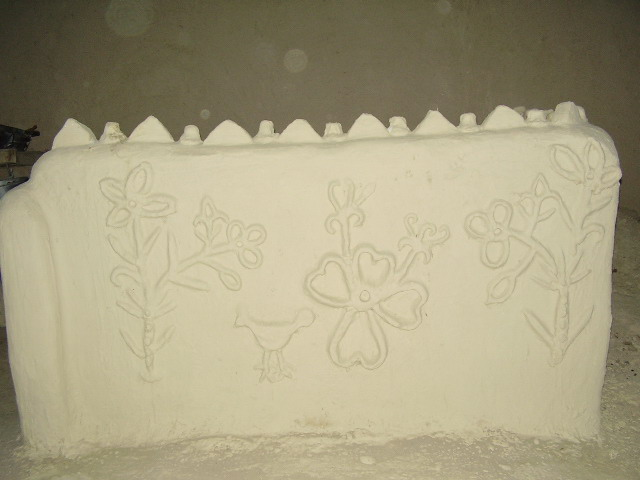
Mud wall art, Punjab Pakistan

A similar form of folk art is noted by Kang (2019) who states that engraving drawings onto walls was popular when mud houses were common in Punjab. Even after the construction of brick houses, the cooking area in the courtyard was enclosed by a mud wall called an 'Ortta' in Punjabi where women continued to parge motifs on the wall. However, having an Ortta has also declined which has affected the practice of traditional drawing. Kohli (1983) assigns the art of "parge decoration, in mud, wrought on the walls of houses" to women. Yellow clay was sometimes used as a base upon which motifs were parged.

An Ortta is also called kandholi (wall) in Punjabi where women would paint drawings. According to Mitawa (2004), the wall would be plastered with coloured clay and then drawn upon using white clay to draw flowers, peacocks and birds. Kehal (2006) notes that shrubs, borders and children's pictures are also drawn on the walls.

=== Gallery ===
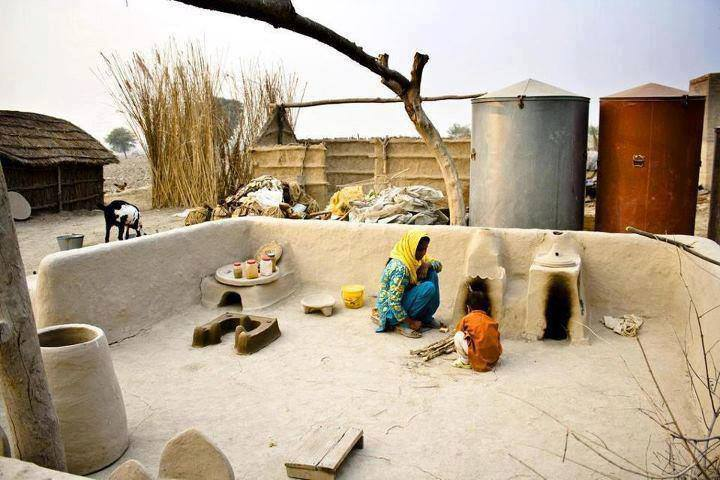
inside a Punjab village house (Pakistan)

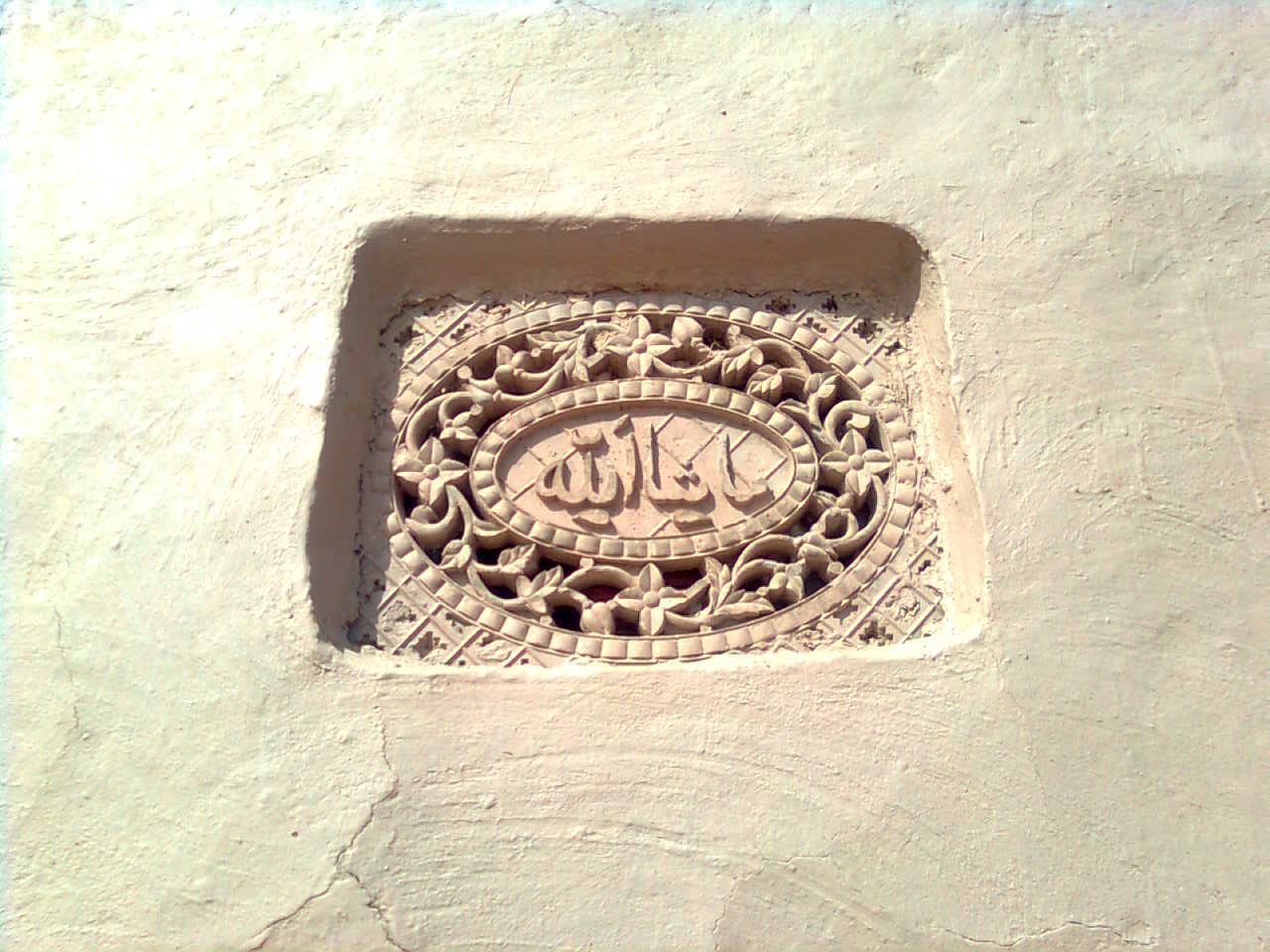
Punjabi style ventilator (Pakistan) showing parge work

== Wall art on festivals ==
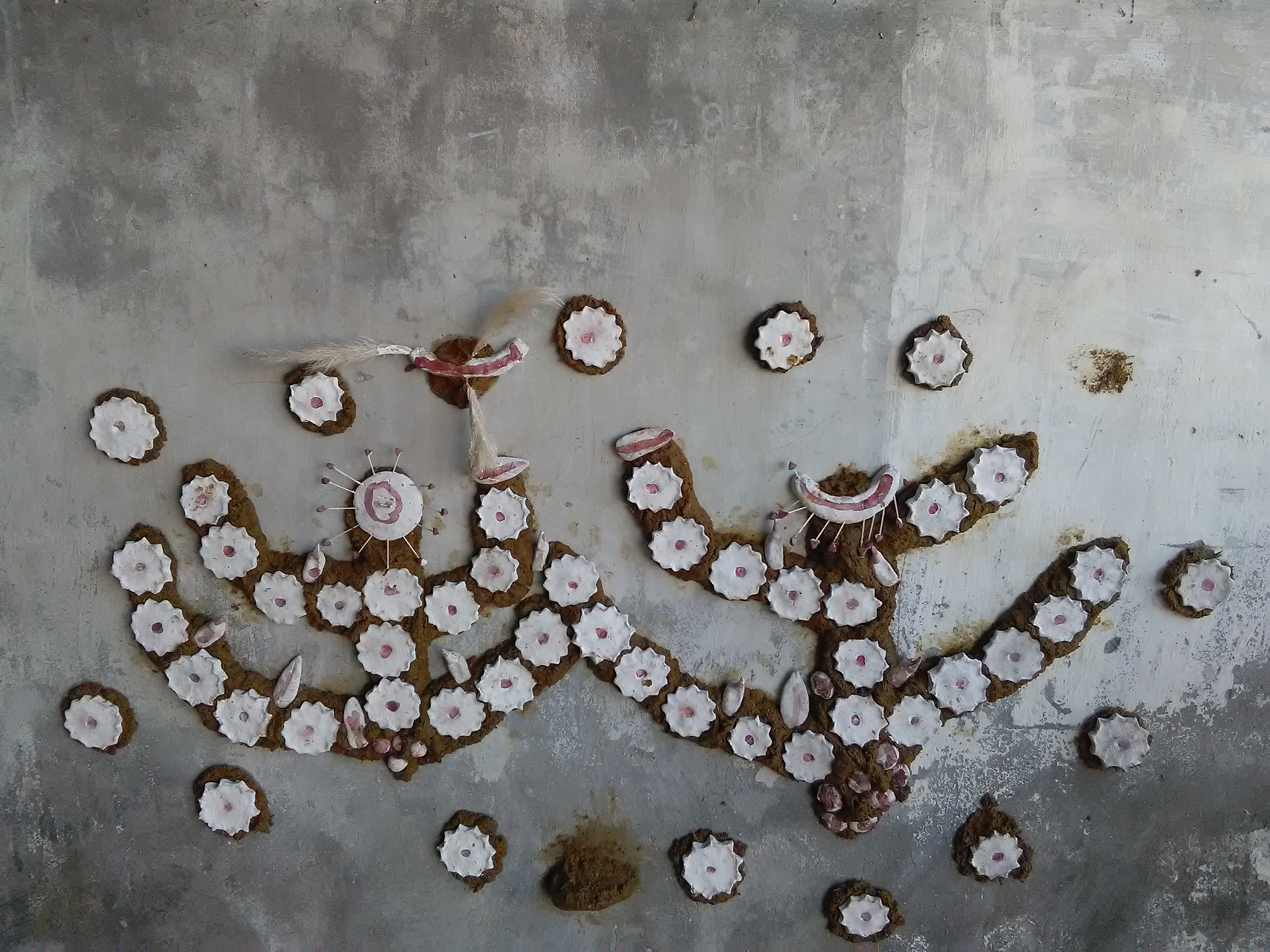
Contemporary Sanjhi image in Punjab

In Punjab, images are painted on walls on festivals such as Sanjhi and Hoi. A local festival on Navratri is observed whereby wheat or barley are planted on the first day and the seedlings are immersed in water on Dussehra. The seedlings are placed before an image of a Goddess on the wall. Similarly, images are painted on festive occasions in Haryana and Uttar Pradesh.

== Floor art ==
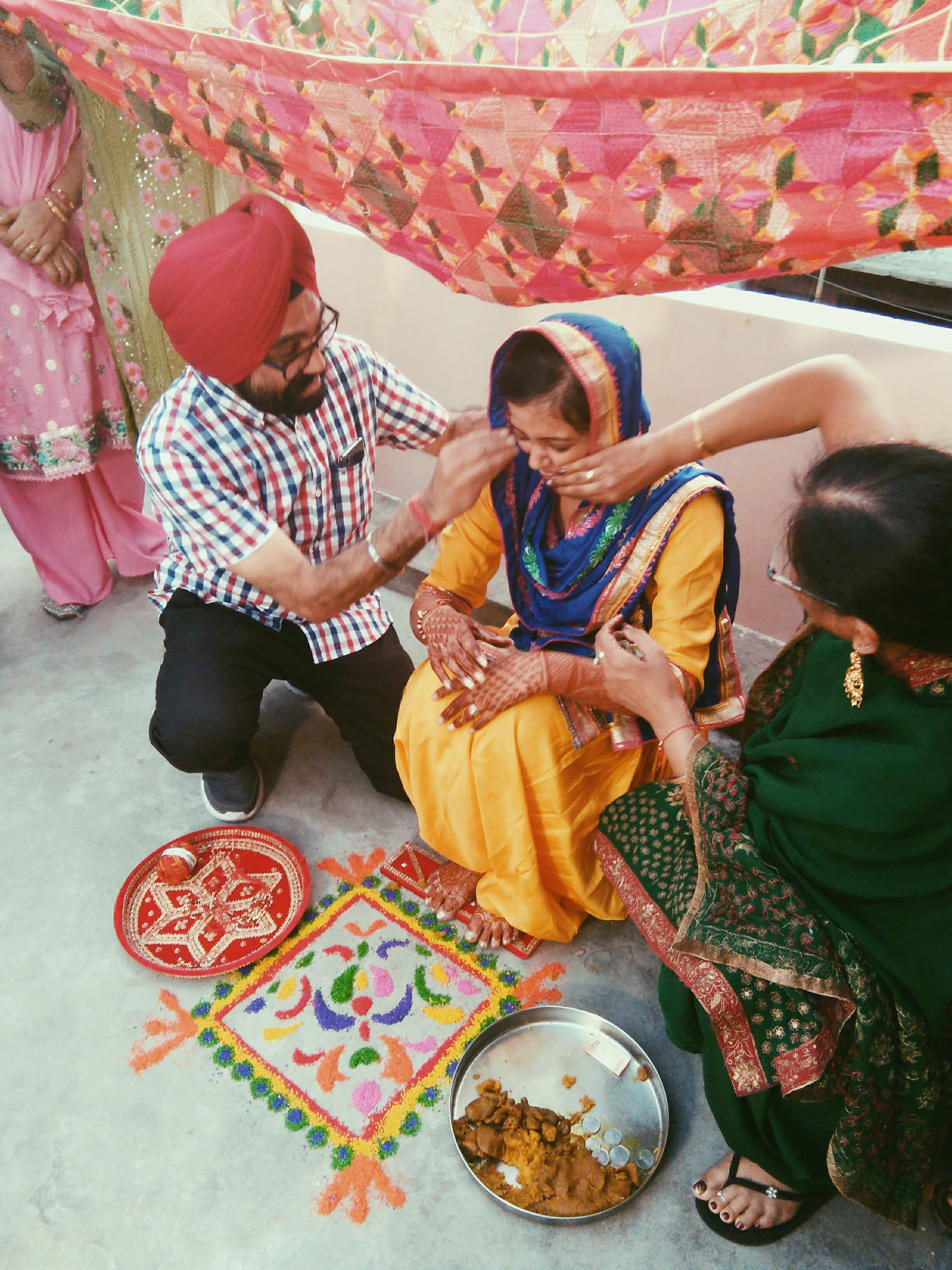
Punjabi wedding rituals. Mayian chowk poorana

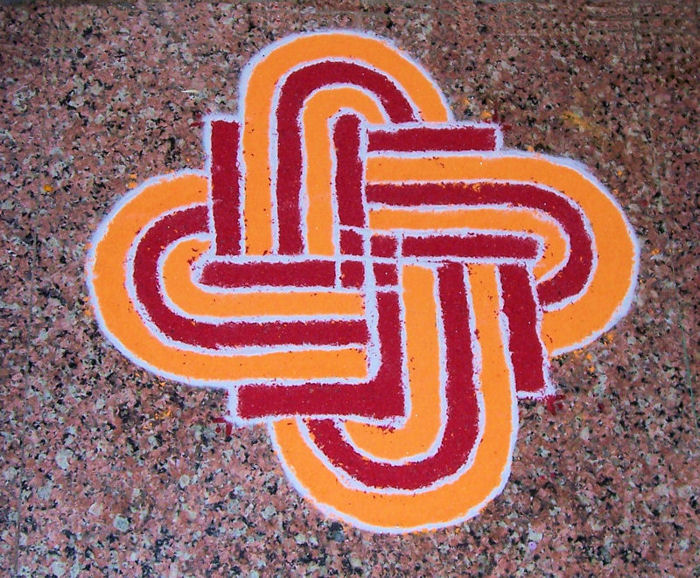
modern form of Chowk poorana. For the traditional chowk using flour in Hoshiarpur Punjab, see AS: image 21 in Plates section Jubbal

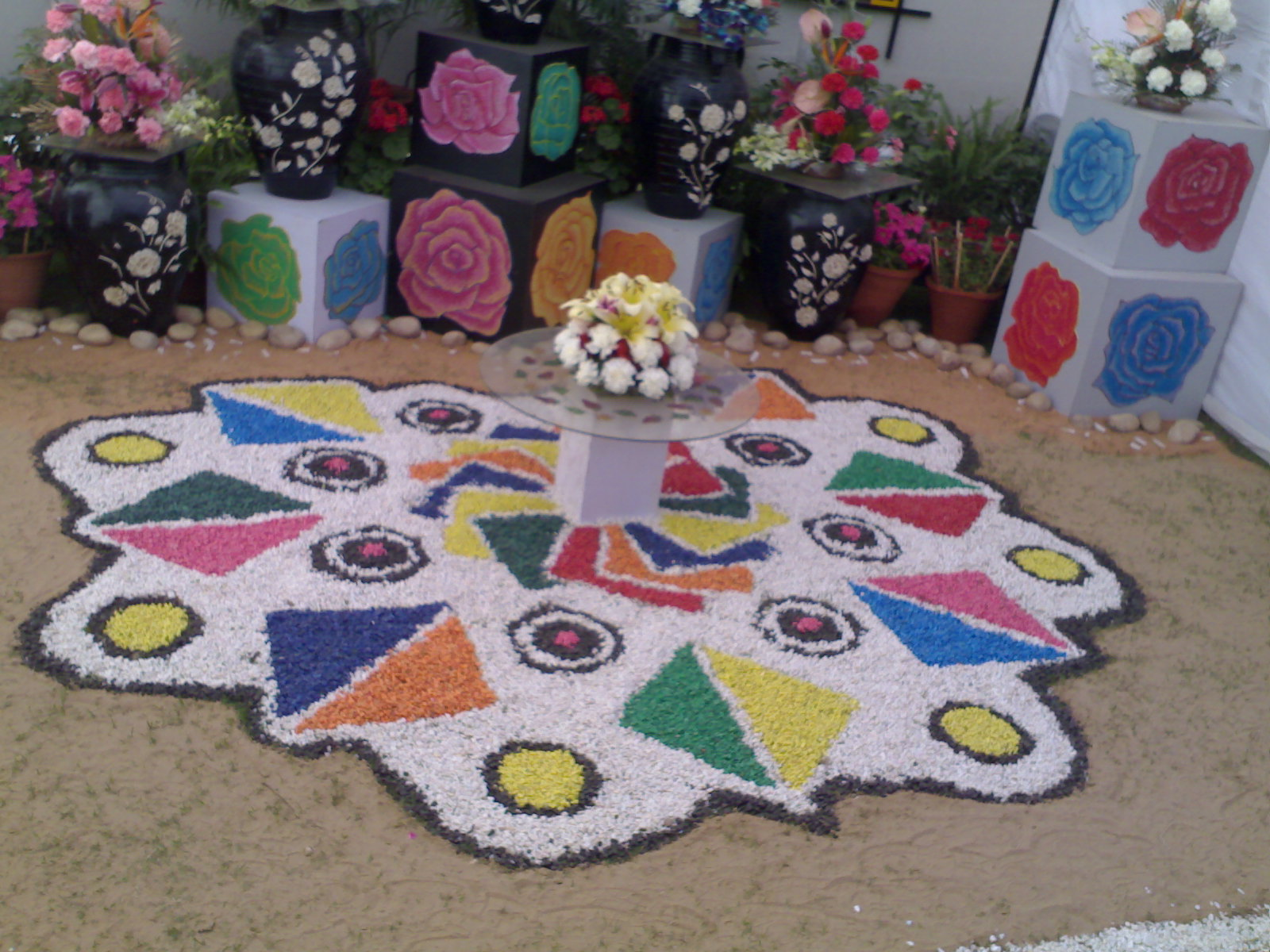
Chowk poorana with marble and stone pieces for competition in Chandigarh

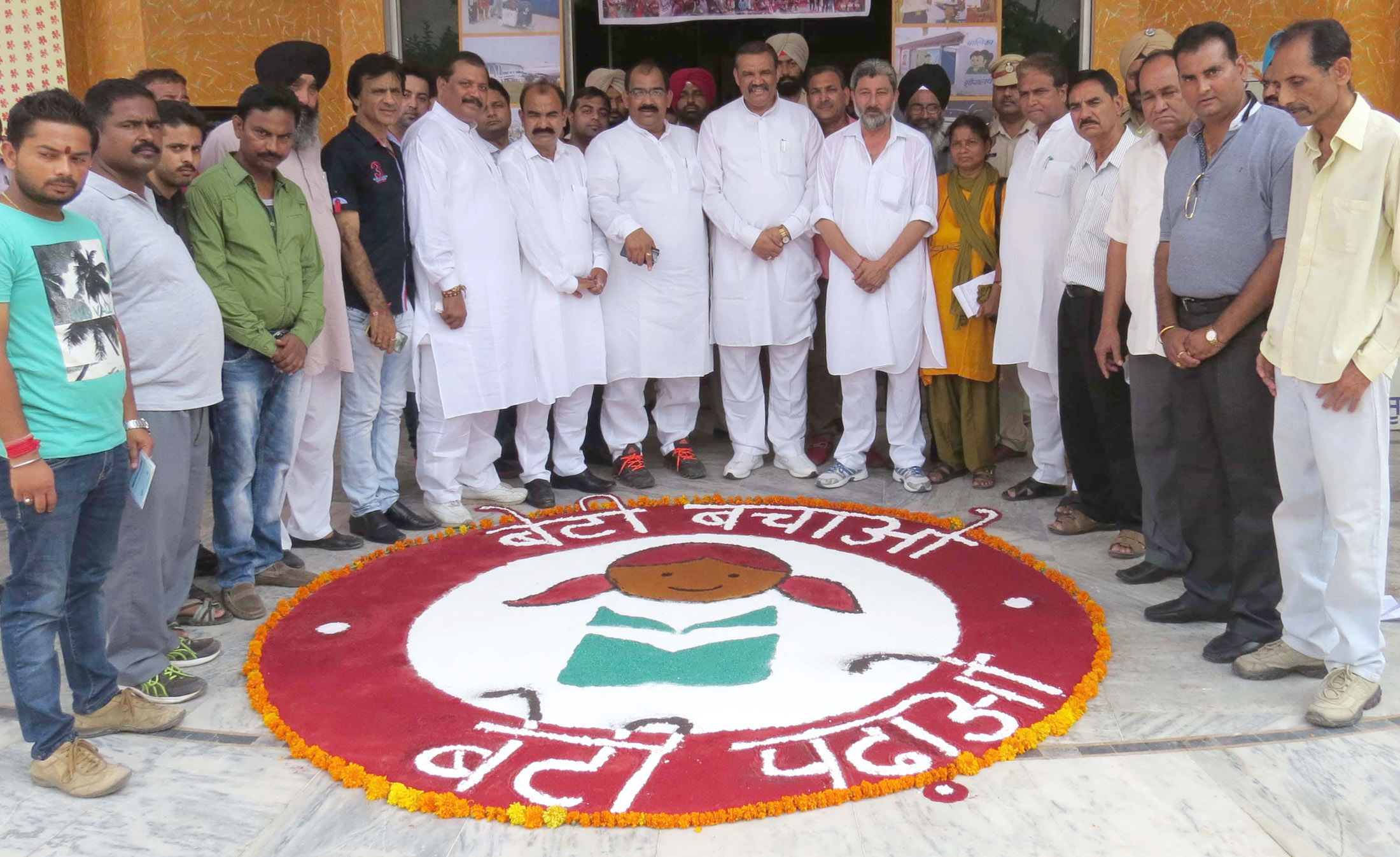
Vijay Sampla, the Deputy Speaker, Vidhan Sabha of Punjab, Shri Dinesh Singh Babbu, the MLA, Pathankot, Shri Ashwani Sharma and other dignitaries looking the Rangoli on 'Beti Bachao Beti Padhao', prepared by the students

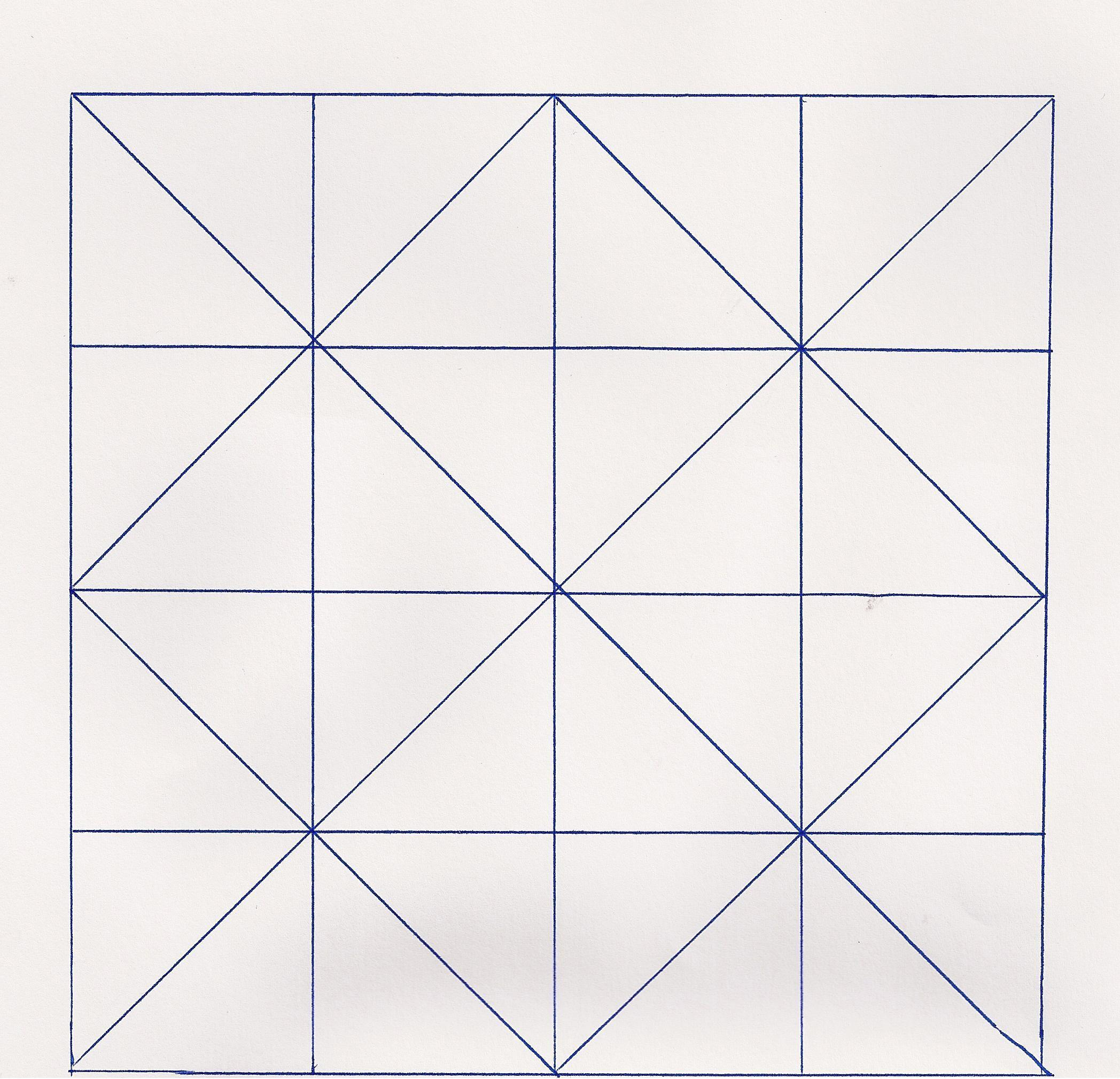
Geometrical chowk used in Punjab traditionally designed using flour and turmeric

According to "A dictionary of the Panjabi language prepared of the Lodiana mission" in 1854, in Punjab, chowk-poorana refers to preparing the square on the floor with flour on weddings and dedications. In religious ceremonies, symbols are drawn for worshipping. Some of the symbols used in Hindu ceremonies include drawing planets and Om. This is similar to the floor art, chowk-poorana, in Uttar Pradesh where pots are placed in the middle and the art is drawn around them in religious ceremonies. In Uttar Pradesh, the alternative name is Sona Rakhna.

In the Punjab, the chowk square is drawn on the floor with flour and turmeric. Sometimes a swastika is also drawn in the square. Such drawings are made before weddings or when the mother of a new born child goes outdoors for the first time. Other festive occasions include the bringing of horses/cows home for the first time. Modern squares are more colourful and use rice.

Aryan (1983) in his study of Punjab folk art writes that the floral and geometrical designs are drawn on mud walls and in courtyards using "powdered colours or earth colours such as white, ultrarine Heel and Indian red Gerua". The patterns are created using a piece of rag. The patterns tend to be simple as compared to the intricate designs of mandana paintings in Rajasthan and Gujarat. Bedi (2001) describes a chowk depicting the planets. However, such a chowk forms part of religious ceremonies and is worshiped.

Floor art of the western Himalaya region, comprising Jammu, parts of Punjab and Himachal Pradesh, is called likhnoo or dehar but it is also called chowk which has its own style of designs. In the lower ridges of Jammu and Himachal Pradesh, which Jerath (1971) called the Dogra region, floor art is termed chowka poorna.

=== Phulkari chowk ===
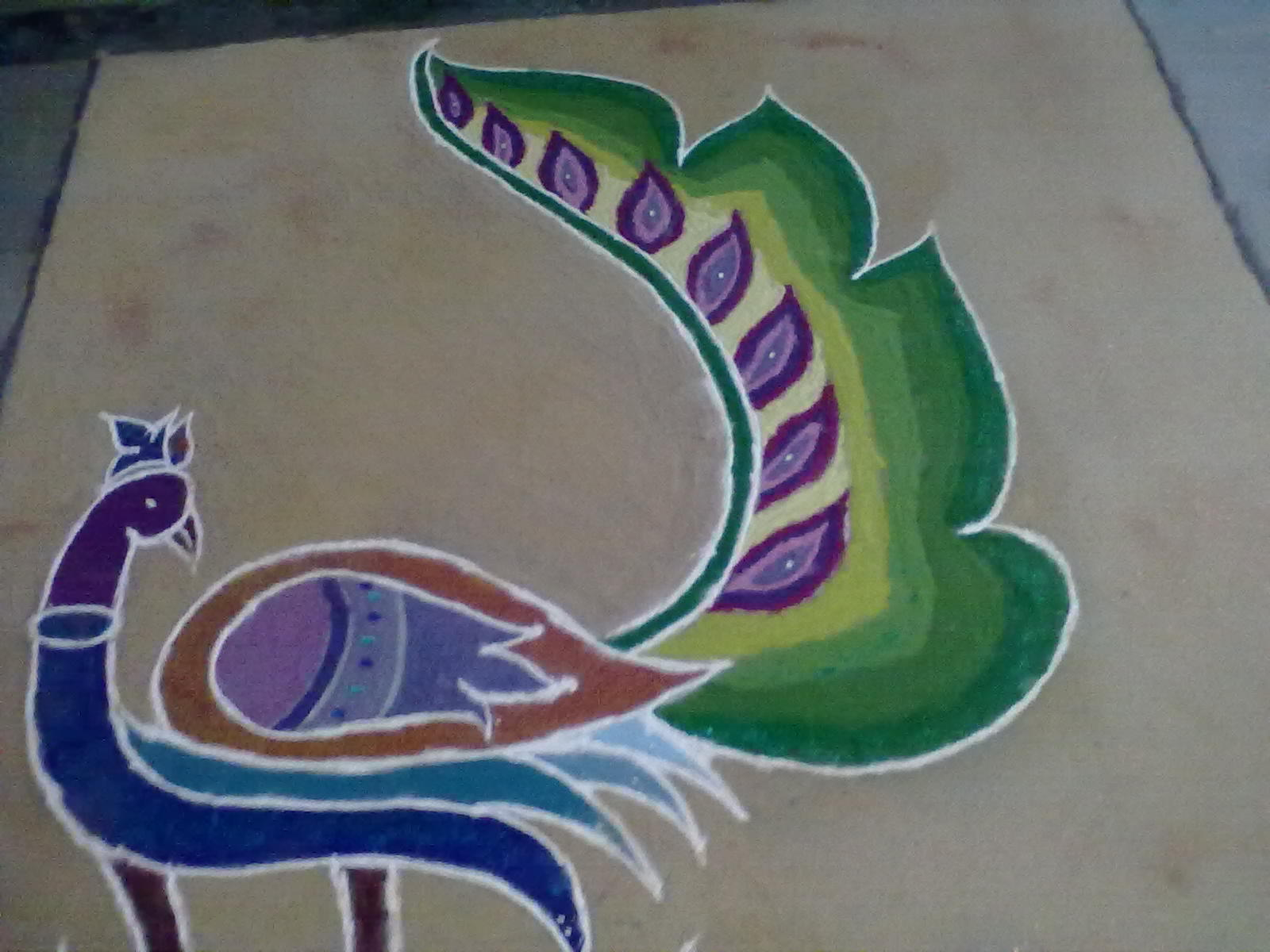
Phulkari Chowk with peacock. Motifs embroidered on Phulkaris are drawn in the Phulkari Chowk in courtyards in Punjab

According to Bedi (2001), sometimes chowk poorana is drawn in Punjabi courtyards using flour and colours. The designs drawn are the motifs embroidered on phulkaris. Green is used for the branches and leaves, and white, red and yellow is used for the flowers. Such chowk is called the phulkari chowk. Bedi states that there are different types of chowk but the starting point is a square made with flour. However, any design can be made within the square such as circles or triangular shapes. Dots are drawn using red sindoor (vermilion).

=== Process ===
Bajpai (2015) in her study of "Brocade and chowkpurana craft and art of Uttar Pradesh prospects for their sustainability" reports of the process of creating chowk poorana floor art in Uttar Pradesh. She states that the night before painting the mud walls, geru is mixed with water to be spread over walls and the floor. Rice is soaked in water on the day of the painting, then finely ground and mixed with water. Geru is "spread in a square or rectangular shape depending on the occasion and after that the design was drawn." Women draw sketches using dots to draw the outline which would then be connected with lines using chalk powder on wet ground, or rice paste on dry surface. Bajpai further states that floor and wall art is practised in Uttar Pradesh on mud and bricks. The art is drawn on religious and social occasions. In Uttar Pradesh, chowk means "auspicious area of home" whereas purana means "drawing on floor/wall." Some of the festivals when chowk art is drawn include Raksha Bandhan, Devthan Puja and Holi. The tradition has been passed from mother to daughter. However, Bajpai notes that the younger generation is influenced by television in the designs more than the older women who practice traditional art work peculiar to Uttar Pradesh, having not seen the folk designs of other states of India.

Although the floor art of the western Himalaya region, comprising Jammu and Himachal Pradesh, is called likhnoo, it is also called chowk or chowka poorna. According to Tadvalkar (2011), in the mountainous region, it is common for women to draw "folk paintings on the floors, thresholds, walls, grain stores, ritual places etc." The process involves sweeping the floor and then plastering it with cow-dung which, once it begins to dry, is then smoothed with a round stone. Sometimes women create foliated borders using finger-tips on the wet coating. The patterns are termed hangaiyan. Tadvalkar (2011) states that the "cow-dunging process is known as lipna in the region, whereas the floor art is referred to as likhnoo (writing), dehar (with respect to dehali, the threshold) or chowk". The background is painted with brown coloured earth (loshti). Materials used to paint include rice or wheat flour paste or white earth known as golu or makol. Tadvalkar further states that women draw floral motifs such as the lotus and rose and also pointed geometrical figures. Colours are used. This type of floor art is called phullchittarana. Such floor art is drawn on various occasions including festivals.

Similarly, Gupta (2020) in her research paper Chauk poorna Uttar Pradesh ki lok sanskriti ka strot ek vivechan, also explains that the art of Chowk Purana in Uttar Pradesh is practiced by women on festivals and happy occasions. Gupta also describes a specific type of Chowk art. When art is drawn at the threshold of a house on a wedding, the art is called chetrau or chiteri which incorporates an image of Ganesh. The colours used to draw a chiteri included yellow, blue and green.

== See also ==
- Kolam
- Mandana paintings
- Rangoli
