= Aho =

Aho or AHO may refer to:

== People ==
- Aho (name), Finnish surname (article includes list of people with the name)
- 'Aho'eitu, figure in Tongan oral history or mythology

== Places ==
- Aho, North Carolina, unincorporated community and river in North Carolina, United States
- Aho-dong, village in North Korea
- Fertilia Airport in Alghero, Sardinia (IATA airport code AHO)
- Netherlands Antilles, former IAAF country code AHO

== Other uses ==
- Aho, a phrase in the Kansai dialect of Japanese, meaning "idiot", see Baka (Japanese word)#Dialectal
- Aboriginal Housing Office, a statutory authority in New South Wales, Australia
- Oslo School of Architecture and Design (AHO, Arkitektur- og designhøgskolen i Oslo)
- Aho report, a 2006 report Creating an innovative Europe
- Aho & Soldan, a Finnish film production company (1925–61)
- 2395 Aho, an asteroid
- Anti-Harassment Order, a form of restraining order

== See also ==
- Ahoy (disambiguation)
- AH (disambiguation)
