= Hoy =

Hoy may refer to:

== People ==
=== Given name ===
- Hoy Menear (died 2023), American politician
- Hoy Phallin (born 1995), Cambodian footballer
- Hoy Wong (1920–2009), American bartender

=== Surname ===
- Hoy (surname), a Scottish and Irish surname
- Høy, a Danish and Norwegian surname

== Places ==
- Hoy, Iran, usually romanized Khoy
- Hoy (Lake Constance), an uninhabited island in Lake Constance, Germany
- Hoy, Orkney, an island in Orkney, Scotland
  - Hoy (hamlet), a location on the Orkney island of the same name
- Hoy, Shetland, a small island in the Shetland Islands, Scotland
- Hoy Sound, north of the island of Hoy, Orkney
- Hoy, West Virginia, United States, an unincorporated community

== Music ==
- "Hoy", the Spanish title for "Wrapped" (Gloria Estefan song), a song by Gloria Estefan from her 2003 album Unwrapped
- "Hoy", a song by Julieta Venegas from the 2013 album Los Momentos
- "Hoy", a song by Maluma from the 2012 album Magia
- "Hoy", a song by Miranda! from the 2004 album Sin Restricciones
- "Hoy", a song by Morbo from their eponymous 2001 album

== Newspapers ==
- Hoy (Dominican Republic newspaper), published in Santo Domingo
- Hoy (Ecuadorian newspaper), based in Quito
- Hoy (Peruvian newspaper), published in Huánuco
- Hoy (Spanish newspaper), published in Extremadura
- Hoy (U.S. newspaper), a Spanish-language paper published in Chicago and Los Angeles

== Other uses ==
- Hoy (boat), a small sloop-rigged coasting ship or a heavy barge
- Hoy (TV program), a Mexican show
- Hoy Field, a baseball field in Ithaca, New York
- Hoy railway station, a closed station in Highland, Scotland
- hoy, ISO 639-3 code for the Holiya language, spoken in India
- House of Yahweh

== See also ==
- Ahoy (disambiguation)
- Høj (disambiguation)
- Hoys (disambiguation)
- Hoye, a surname
- Oi (disambiguation)
- Oy (disambiguation)
