= Hoys =

Hoys or HOYS may refer to:

- Horse of the Year Show
- Hoys Roadlines

== See also ==
- Hoy (disambiguation)
