= Mandana painting =

Painting in Rajasthan and Madhya Pradesh, India

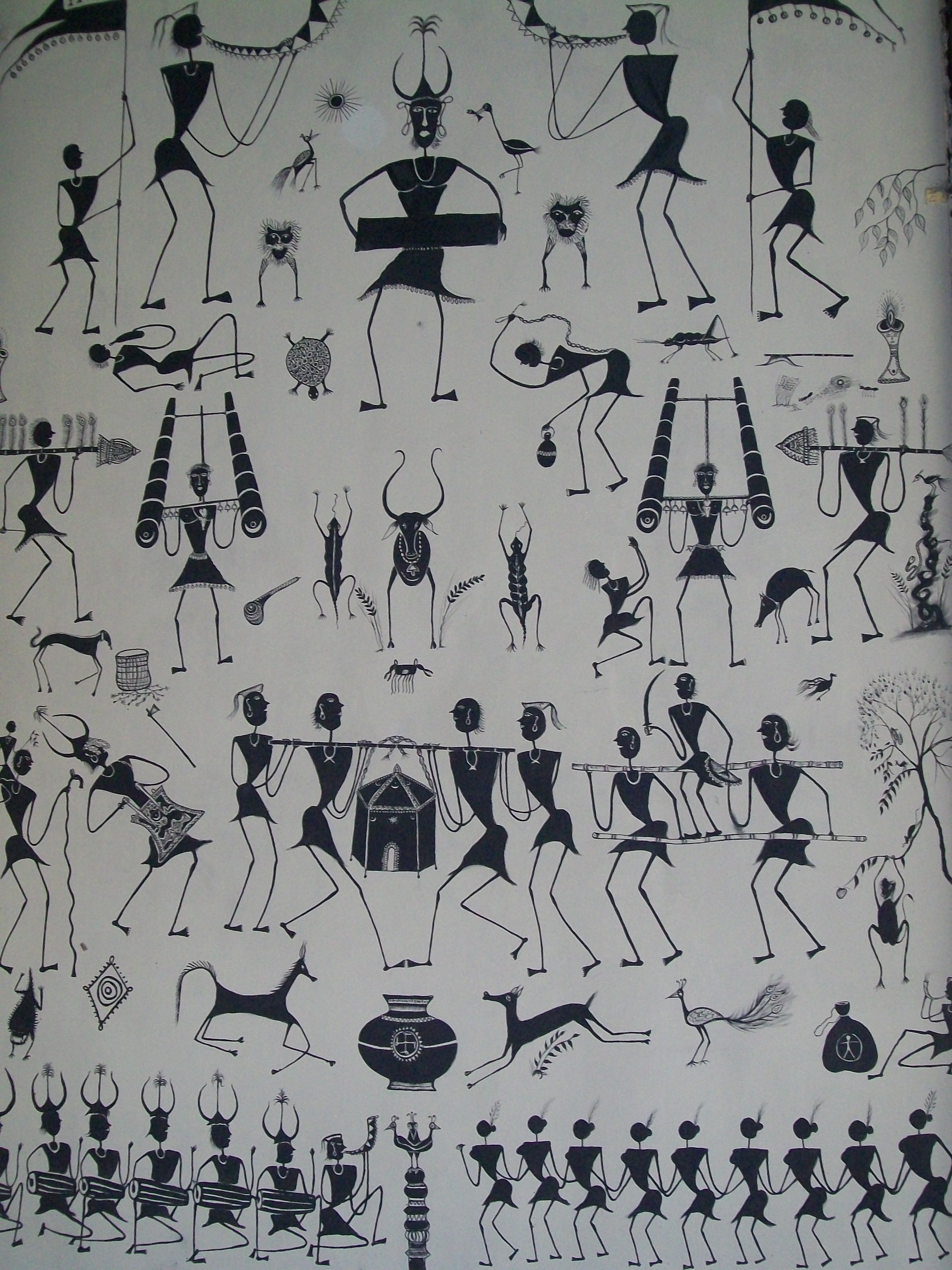
A Mandana painting depicting wedding celebrations. From the Crafts Museum.

Mandana paintings are wall and floor paintings of Rajasthan and Madhya Pradesh, India. Mandana are drawn to protect home and hearth, welcome gods into the house and as a mark of celebrations on festive occasions. Meena women in the Hadoti area of Rajasthan possess skill for developing designs of perfect symmetry and accuracy. The art is practised on floors and walls, and the practice is often passed from mother to daughter. The art is much more pronounced and attached to Meena community of Hadoti area. The ground is prepared with cow dung mixed with rati, a local clay, and red ochre. Lime or chalk powder is used for making the motif. Tools employed are a piece of cotton, a tuft of hair, or a rudimentary brush made out of a date stick. The design may show Ganesha, peacocks, women at work, tigers, floral motifs, etc. Such paintings are also called Mandala in most of the parts of Nepal.

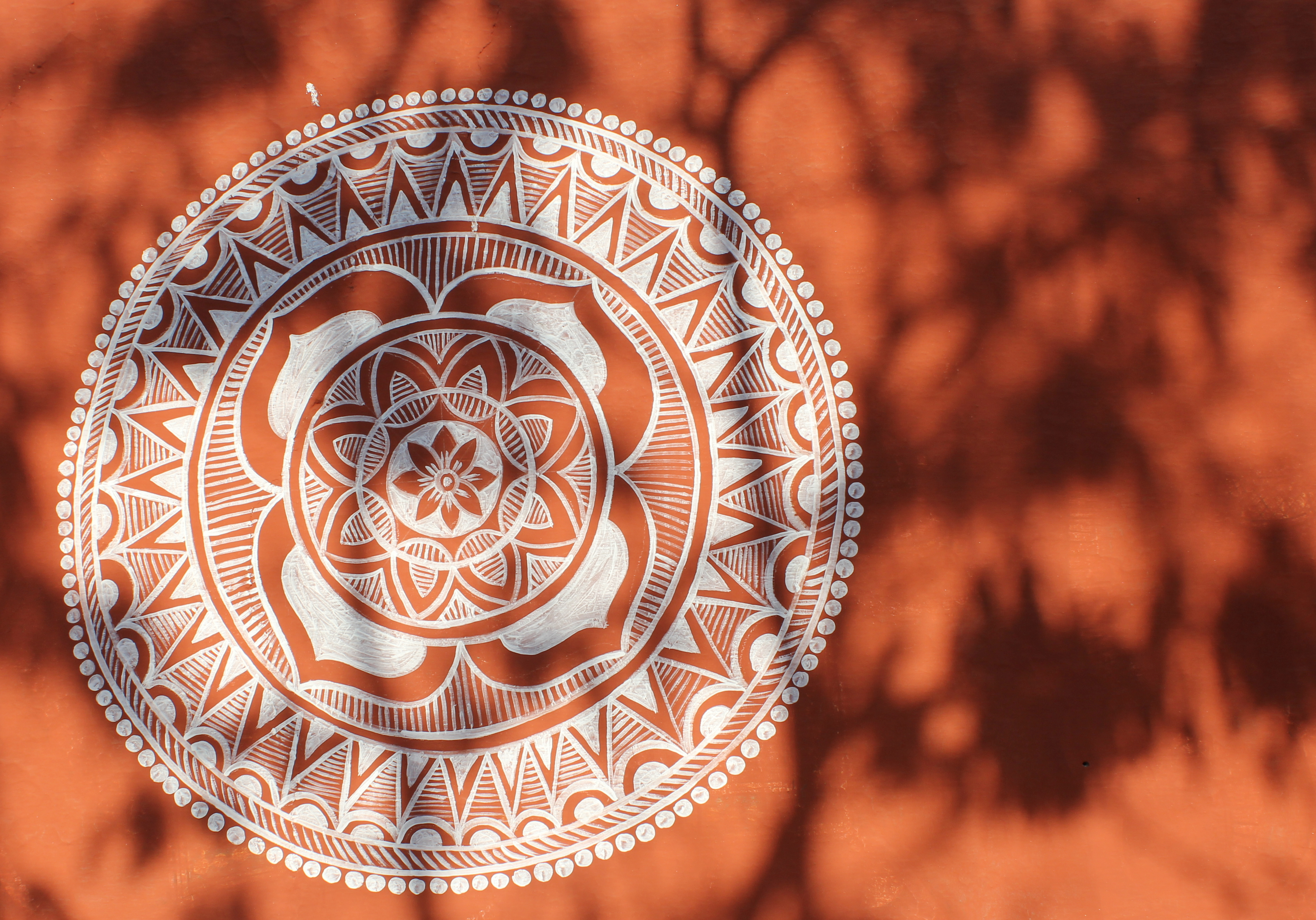
Mandana art work from Shilpgram, Udaipur

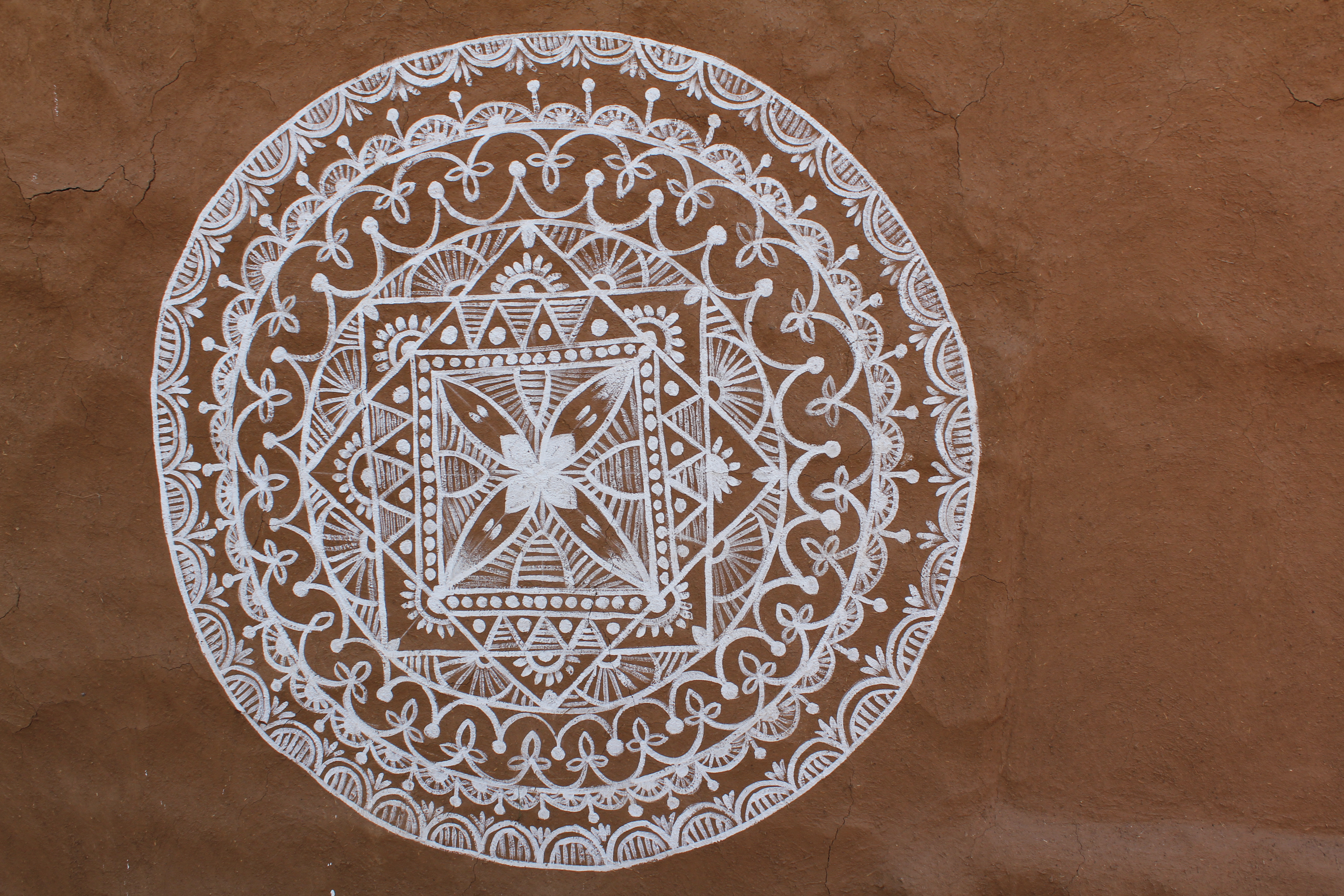
Mandana art work on the walls of Rajasthani mud huts from Shilpgram, Udaipur

In recent times, the practice has become less visible and has been called outdated. Conservation efforts, such as those of Koshalya Devi from Baran, have been engaged in preserving and conserving the traditional white chalk on red background Mandana drawings. Devi has painted over 100 designs in the Mandana style on hardboard using oil paints, and is also engaged in spreading the practice to other countries.

== See also ==
- Chowk poorana
