= Hoye =

Hoye is a surname. Notable people with the surname include:

- Daniel O. Hoye, American politician
- Hal Hoye (born 1957), American bobsledder
- James Hoye (born 1971), American baseball umpire
- Rico Hoye (born 1974), American boxer

== See also ==
- Hoy (disambiguation)
