= HOJ =

HOJ or hoj may refer to:

- Hadauti language (ISO 639-3 code: hoj), Rajasthan, India
- Hamiltonganj railway station (Indian Railways station code: HOJ), West Bengal, India

== See also ==
- Høj (disambiguation)
- Aleš Hojs (born 1961), Slovenian politician
