= Høy =

Høy is a Danish and Norwegian surname. Notable people with the surname include:

- Alfred Høy (1885–1970), Norwegian engineer
- Andreas Høy (1817–?), Norwegian politician
- Iver Høy (1877–1943), Norwegian businessman
- Jytte Høy (born 1951), Danish artist

== See also ==
- Høj (disambiguation)
- Hoy (disambiguation)
