= Høj =

Høj may refer to:

== People ==
- Frank Høj (born 1973), Danish cyclist
- Peter Høj (born 1957), Danish-Australian academic
- Claus Høj Jensen (active 1999–2016), Danish sailor and sail maker
- Frank Høj Jensen (born 1945), Danish sailor
- Poul Richard Høj Jensen (born 1944), Danish sailor, boatbuilder and sailmaker

== Other uses ==
- HØJ Elite (men's handball)
- HØJ Elite (women's handball)

== See also ==
- HOJ (disambiguation)
- Hoy (disambiguation)
- Høy, a surname
