= Ahoy (disambiguation) =

Ahoy is a signal word used to call to a ship or boat.

Ahoy or Ahoj may also refer to:

- Rotterdam Ahoy, an indoor sports arena in Rotterdam, Netherlands
- Australian Humanist of the Year, an award
- Chips Ahoy!, a brand of cookie
- Ahoy!, a computer magazine
- Ahoy Comics, American comic book publisher
- AHOY! SIDE A, a 2018 album, and the 2024 follow-up, AHOY! SIDE B, by Icelandic singer-songwriter Svavar Knútur

== See also ==
- Ahoi Ashtami
- Ahoj, an area in Nové Mesto, Bratislava
