= Sanjhi =

Religious festival to the mother goddess Sanjhi

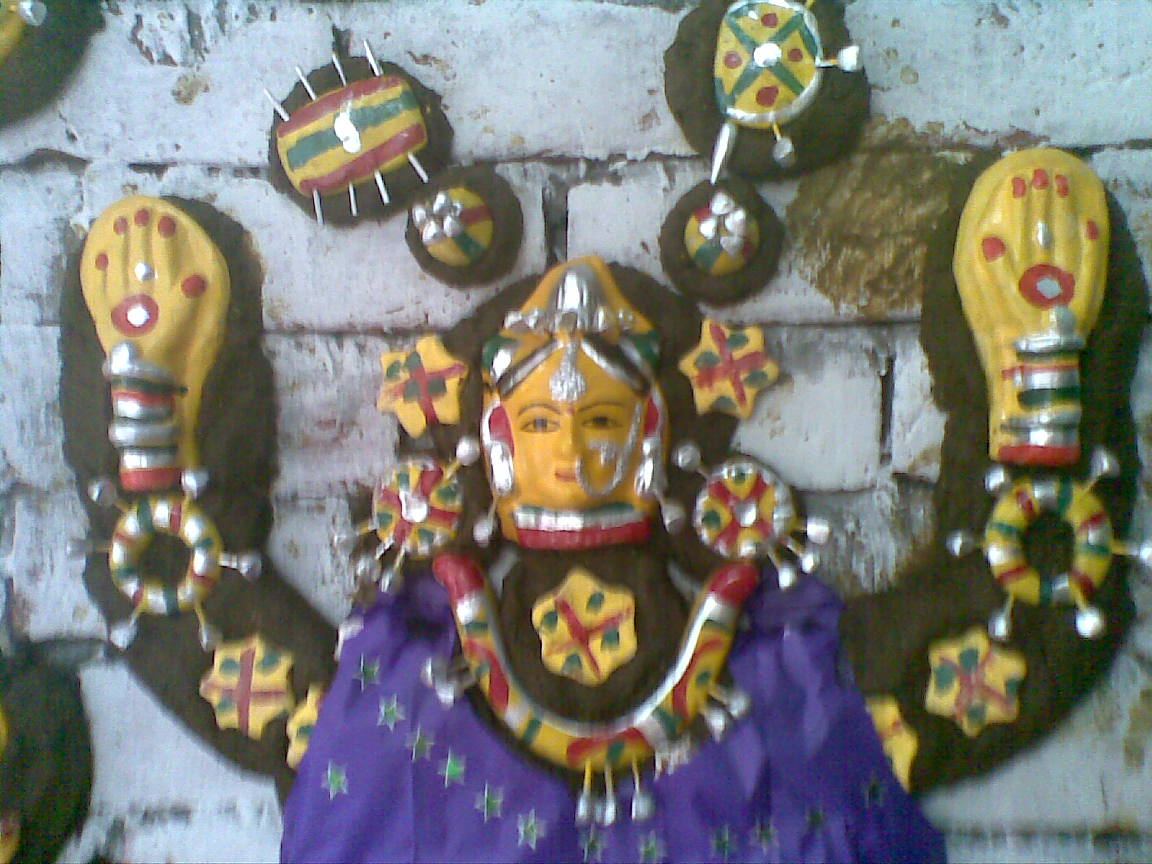
Sanjhi mata

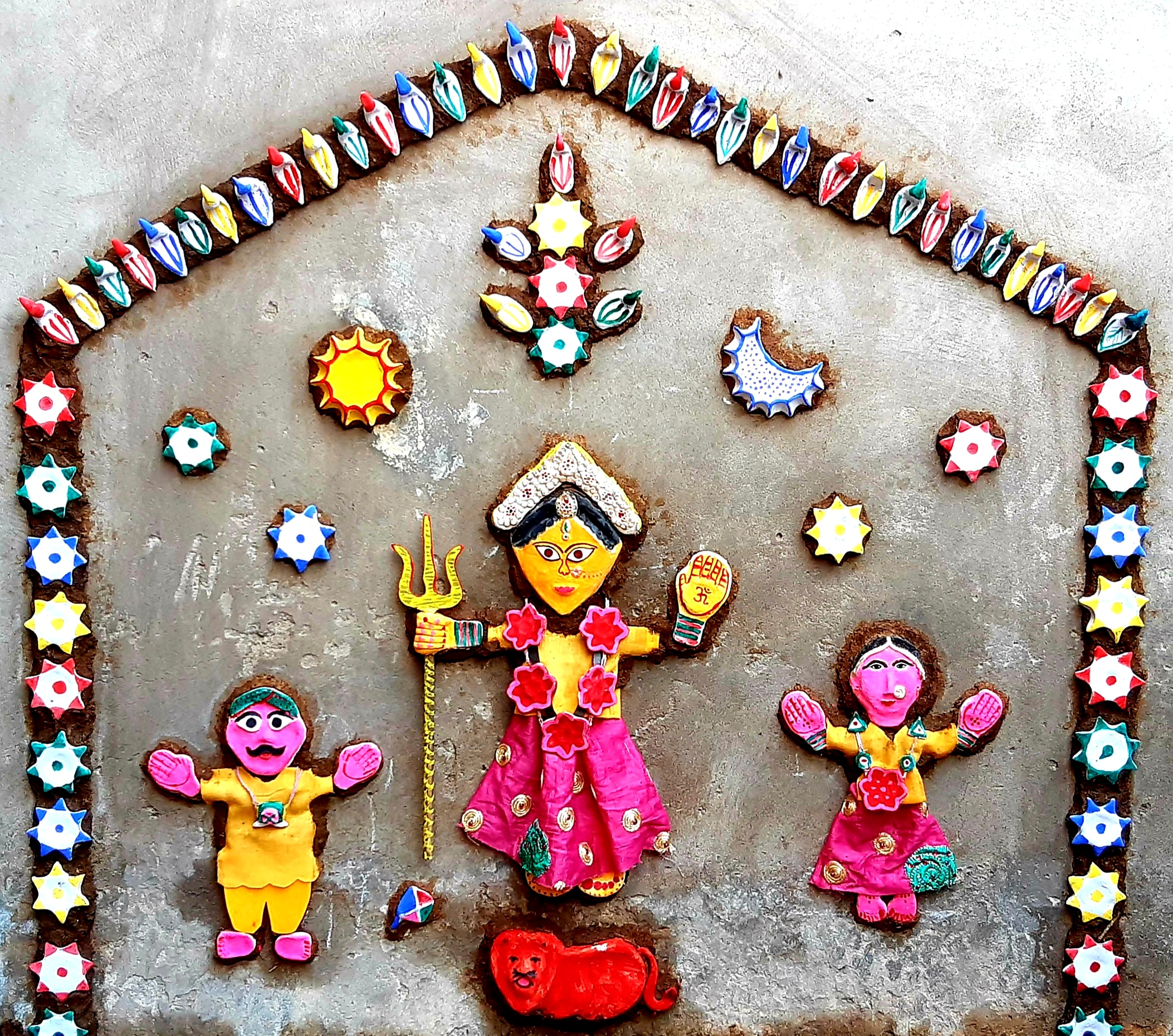
Goddess Sanjhi Mata in Bihta village Haryana.

Sanjhi is a festival to the namesake goddess, mainly by women and girls in parts of Delhi, Punjab, Haryana, and Uttar Pradesh.

== Sanjhi ==
Sanjhi is the name of a mother goddess, after whom images are made of mud and molded into various shapes such as cosmic bodies or the face of the goddess, and they get different colors. The local potters make images of various body parts like her arms, legs, face decked with ornaments and weapons. These additions make the image look beautiful and gracious. The additions to the image this way depend upon the economic means of the family.

The image is designed on the first day of the nine days of Durga Puja or Navratri. Every day women from the neighborhood are invited for singing bhajans and performing aarti. The young girls also gather there and offer their adoration to the mother who is believed to get them suitable husbands. The aarti or the bhajans are chanted daily and some elderly woman guides others. Men can also be a part of the puja after work of the day gets over. Sanjhi image is prepared on the wall by those families who seek fulfillment of their wishes termed mannat by Punjabis. Some people also seek her blessings for the marriage of their daughters. Kirtan is performed and the image is immersed in water on the last day. The Sanjhi festival ends with the immersion of Sanjhi on the day of Dussehra.

The girls offer prayers and food to the goddess every day.

== Sanjhi in the temple tradition of Vraja ==
As a traditional art of Vraja, Lord Krishna's homeland, sanjhi is intrinsically linked to the transcendental sports of the divine couple Krishna and Radha, whose play of love is depicted in the sanjhi designs. Vaishnava theology traces the origin of sanjhi to the divine lila itself: sanjhi designs were created by Radha in order to evoke Lord Krishna's presence. Folk mythology also holds another version of the same lila, according to which it was Lord Krishna who, at evening twilight time, prepared a beautiful image of Radha made of flowers in order to appease her.

The early tradition of preparing sanjhis made of cow dung and flowers, which is still practiced in the villages, has been taken up by the Vaishnava temples around the 15th/16th centuries and developed into a highly sophisticated art form practiced by specially trained Brahman priests. The major type of temple sanjhi is prepared from dry colors upon an octagonal earthen platform symbolizing an eight-petalled lotus. The heart (hauda) of the design constitutes the seat of the divine couple, the sanctum sanctorum; from here, an intricate layout of artfully interlocked diagonal patterns enables the expansion of divinity towards the eight directions. The worship of a mystic design as in sanjhi is rooted in early Hinduism and Tantrism, and has obvious parallels in Vajrayana and Mahayana Buddhism. In both cases, song rendered in front of the design constitutes the central element of worship.

== See also ==
- Punjabi Folk Religion
