= Ahoi Ashtami =

Hindu Festival

Ahoi Ashtmi
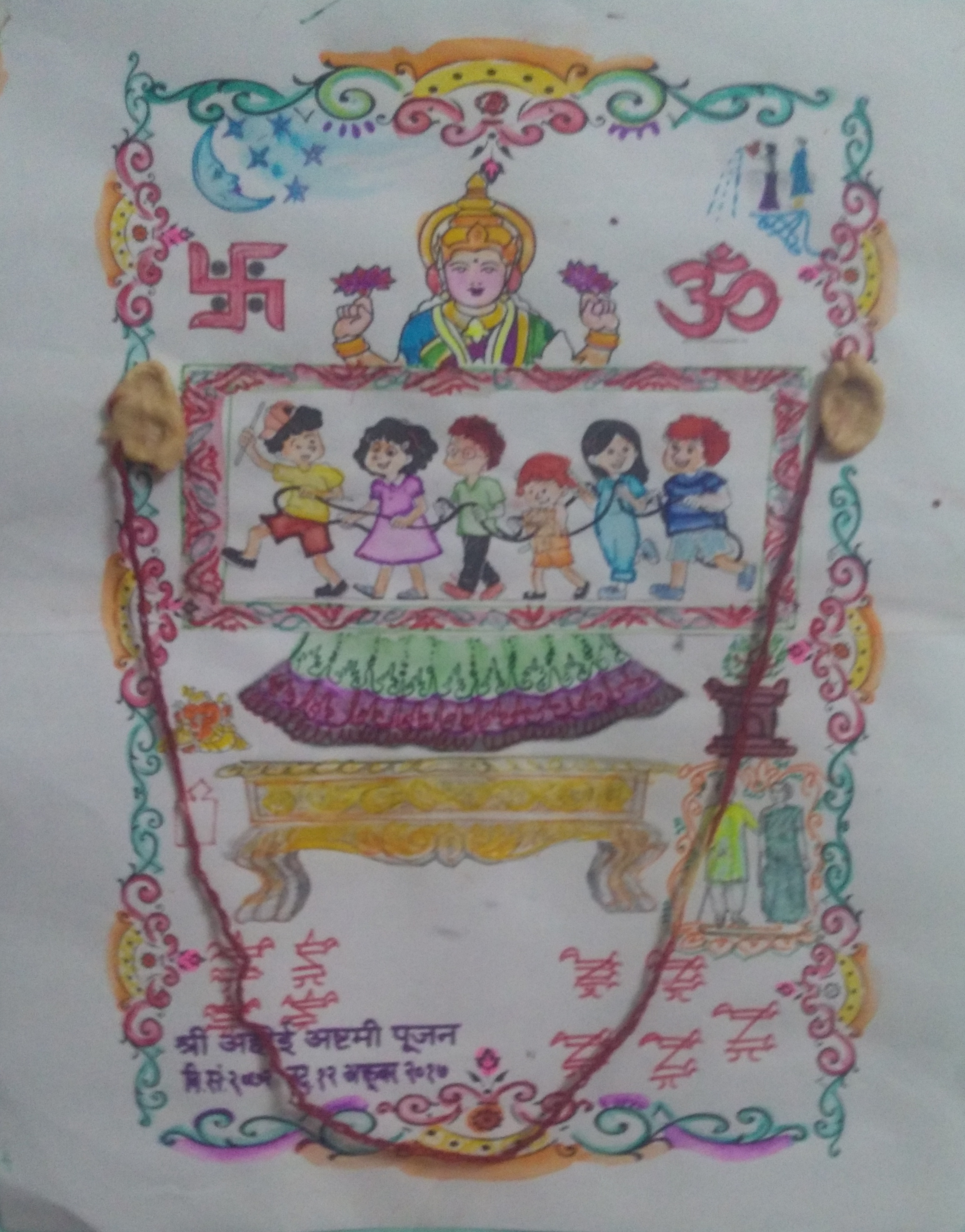
- Also called: Karak Ashtami, Karāshatmi (Marathi), Avahi Aathein (Awadhi), Chakri (Punjabi)
- Observed by: Hindu Mothers
- Type: Hindu festival day
- Significance: Honors the unconditional love and protective prayers of a mother
- Celebrations: 1 day
- Observances: Fasting by mothers
- Begins: Eighth day of the waning moon fortnight (Krishna paksha) in the month of Kartik
- Date: Ashtami tithi of Kartik Krishna Paksha
- Related to: Karva Chauth, Dussehra and Diwali

Ahoi Ashtami is a Hindu festival celebrated about 8 days before Diwali on Krishna Paksha Ashtami. According to Purnimant calendar followed in North India, it falls during the month of Kartik and according to Amanta calendar followed in Gujarat, Maharashtra and other southern states, it falls during the month of Ashvin. However, it is just the name of the month which differs and the fasting of Ahoi Ashtami is done on the same day.

The fasting and puja on Ahoi Ashtami are dedicated to Mata Ahoi or Goddess Ahoi. She is worshiped by mothers for the well-being and long life of their children. This day is also known as Ahoi Aathe because fasting for Ahoi Ashtami is done during Ashtami Tithi which is the eighth day of the lunar month. Ahoi Mata is none other than Goddess Lakshmi.

== Practices ==
On the day of fasting, after taking morning bath women take a pledge, called Sankalp, to keep the fast for the well being of their children. It is also recited during Sankalp that the fasting would be without any food or the water and the fast would be broken after sighting the stars or the moon according to their family tradition.

Puja preparations are finished before sunset. Women either draw the image of Goddess Ahoi on the wall using geru or embroider it on a piece of cloth and hang it on a wall. Any image of Ahoi Mata used for the puja should have Ashtha Koshthak i.e. eight corners due to the festival being associated with Ashtami Tithi. The image includes along with Goddess Ahoi, the images of young children and a lion.

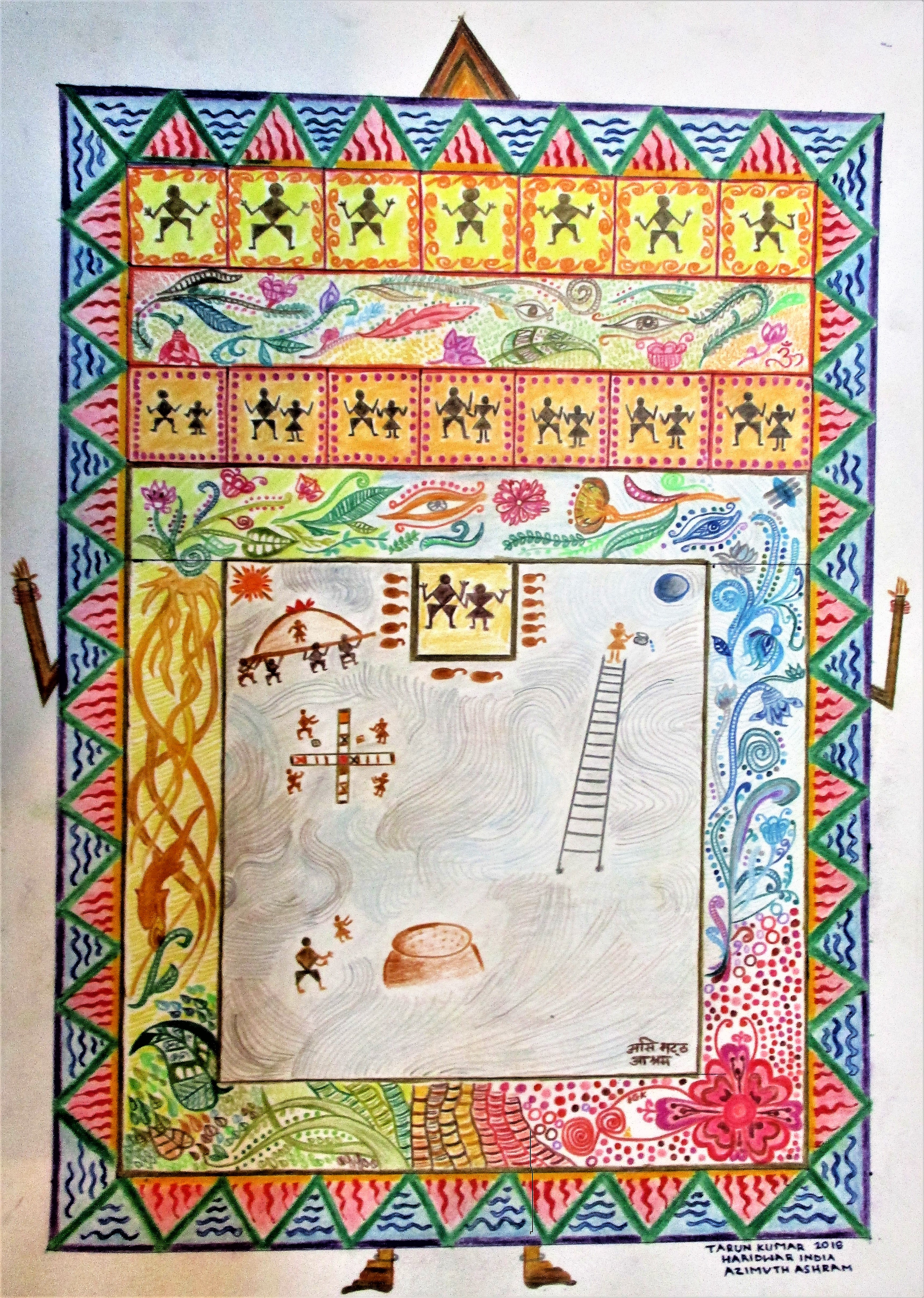
Prayers to Ahoi Mata

Then, the place of worship is sanctified with holy water and Alpana is drawn. After spreading wheat on the floor or on the wooden stool, one water-filled kalash (pot) is kept at the place of worship. The mouth of the Kalash is covered with an earthen lid.

A small earthen pot, preferably Karwa is kept on the top of the Kalash. Karwa is filled with the water and covered with its lid. The nozzle of the Karwa is blocked with the shoots of the grass. The commonly used shoot is known as Sarai Seenka which is a type of willow. The seven shoots of the grass are also offered to Ahoi Mata and lion. The shoot of Sarai is sold during the festival especially in the small towns of India. If grass shoots are not available then cotton buds can be used.

The food items which are used in Puja include 8 Puri, 8 Pua and Halwa. These food items are given to a Brahmin along with some money.

== Origin tale ==
There are many tales related to this observance and one of them is told just after the puja is done as part of the ritual.

Once upon a time, there lived a moneylender who had seven sons. One day in the month of Kartik, just a few days before Diwali festivities, the moneylender's wife decided to repair and decorate her house for Diwali celebrations. To renovate her house, she decided to go to the forest to fetch some soil. While digging the soil in the forest, she accidentally kills the young one of a lion with the spade with which she was digging the soil. The animal then curses her to a similar fate and within a year all her 7 children die.

The couple unable to tolerate the grief decide to kill themselves en route to a final pilgrimage. They keep walking till they no longer able to and fall unconscious on the ground. God, on seeing this, feels pitiful for then and makes an Akashvani asking them to go back, serve the holy cow and worship Goddess Ahoi as she was believed to be the protector of the offspring of all living beings. The couple feeling much better, return home.

They follow the divine command. When the day of Ashtami came, the wife drew the face of the young lion and observed fast and performed Goddess Ahoi fast. She honestly repented for the sin which she had committed. Goddess Ahoi was pleased with her devotion and honesty and appeared before her and gave her the boon of fertility.

In the story variation used in Punjab, a baby porcupine or porcupette is killed instead of a lion by the moneylender's wife.

== Krishnashtami ==
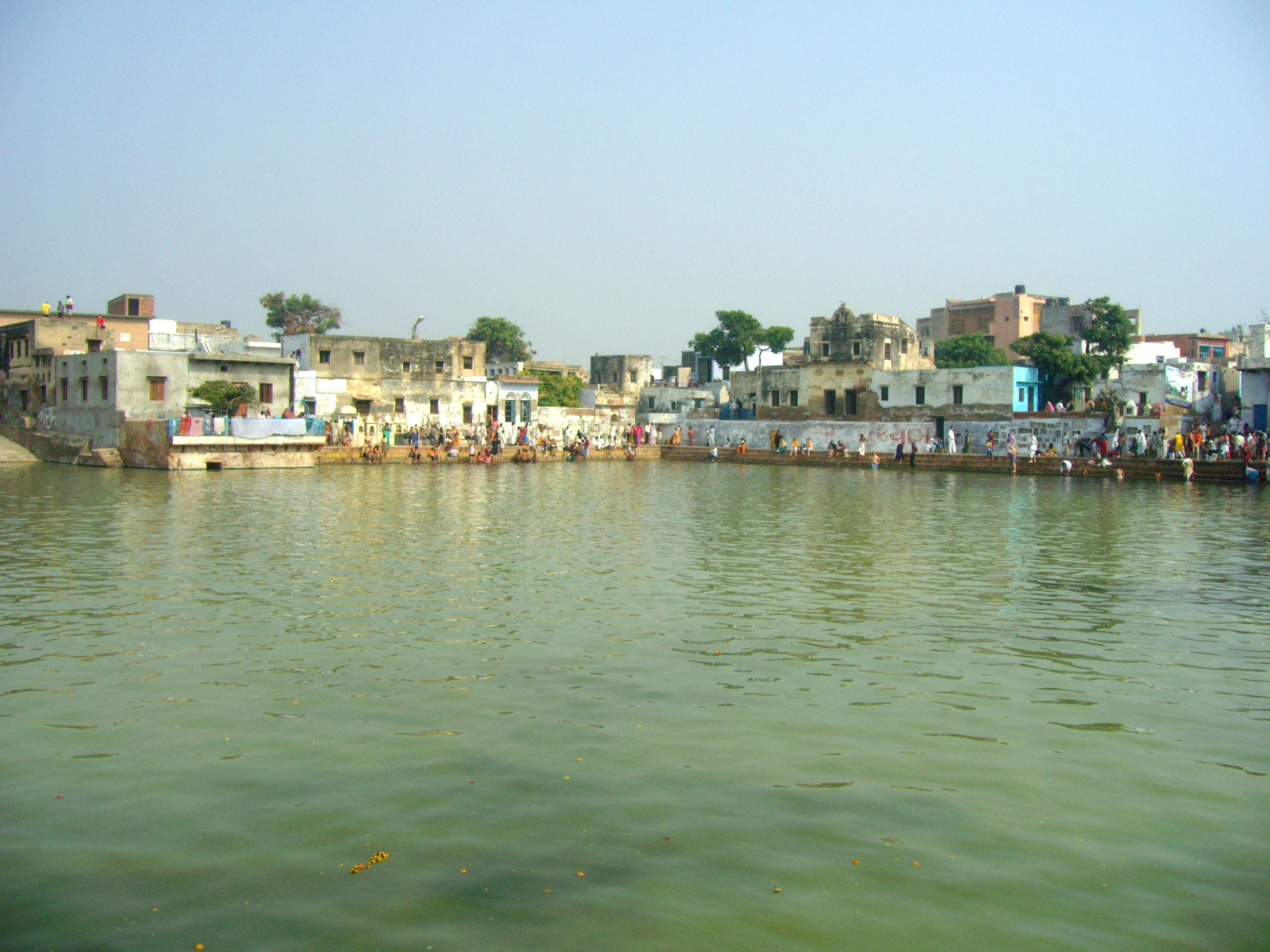
Krishnashtami bath at Radha Kund.

Women who want children like Shri krishna can fast and perform all prayers and rituals of Ahoi Ashtami, also on Krishnashtami after God Krishna. On this day, such women who wish for a child, take bath in Radha Kund, in Mathura district of Uttar Pradesh, at Arunodaya, which is before sunrise. Goddess Kushmanda is worshiped, for this purpose.

== Temples ==
Ahoi Mata Temple at Radha Kund, Uttar Pradesh, India.
